= List of hemipterans of Sri Lanka =

Sri Lanka is a tropical island situated close to the southern tip of India. The invertebrate fauna is as large as it is common to other regions of the world. There are about two million species of arthropods found in the world, and still is counting.

The following list is about confirmed hemipterans recorded in Sri Lanka, though many new unconfirmed sightings are existent.

== Hemipterans ==
Phylum: Arthropoda
Class: Insecta
Order: Hemiptera

The Hemiptera order of insects includes the insects commonly known as the true bugs. The order includes planthoppers, leafhoppers, shield bugs, cicadas, aphids. More than 70,000 species are distributed worldwide. Most hemipterans are plant sap feeders, some are parasitic, while the rest are predators who attack small insects and small invertebrates. Most species are terrestrial and a few are aquatic. Hemipterans are hemimetabolous, where young are similar to adults in the morphology. Hemipterans are economically important insects, where most of them are agricultural pests and vertebrate parasites.

The following list provide the hemipterans currently identified in Sri Lanka. Sri Lanka is known to be home for 794 species of hemipterans included to 71 families. Detailed work of Sri Lankan hemipterans are recorded in book Catalogue of Hemiptera of Sri Lanka. Sri Lanka comprises 74 species in 46 genera and 6 families of aphids within order Hemiptera. Two endemic aphid species found on Sri Lanka. Many researches have been carried out by different hemipteran families by local and overseas experts.

In 2009, M. Prashanthini and M. Vinobaba of Eastern University of Sri Lanka carried out experiments on mealybugs and identified 38 species of mealybugs from Sri Lanka with new exotic species. Un updated systematic catalogue of cicadas of South Asia have been published in 2016. According to that, 22 species of cicadas were recorded from Sri Lanka. Chopra and Rustagi in 2012 published the characters of the subfamily Chauliopinae from India and Sri Lanka.

In 2012, B. Vasantharaj David compiled the checklist and diversity of whiteflies of Sri Lanka with new records of seven species and new Pealius species from Sri Lanka. Fourteen species belonging to eight genera of soft scales were identified with two introduced species from Sri Lanka. The provisional checklist of the leafhoppers in Sri Lanka have been compiled by Dr. Rajendramani Gnaneswaran of the department of zoology, University of Jaffna. With her revision, 257 leafhopper species belonging to 120 genera have been identified from Sri Lanka.

=== Family: Achilidae - achilid planthoppers ===
- Akotropis malayana
- Callinesia fimbriolata
- Caristianus indicus
- Chroneba pallifrons
- Epirama conspergata
- Gordiacea oculata
- Indorupex albivenulosa
- Magadha nebulosa
- Paratangia marginata
- Paratangia notata
- Tangina bipunctata

=== Family: Aclerdidae - aclerdid scales ===
- Aclerda distorta

=== Family: Adelgidae - spruce aphids ===
- Pseudophacopteron floccosa

=== Family: Aleyrodidae - whiteflies ===
- Aleurocanthus citriperdus
- Aleurocanthus ficicola
- Aleurocanthus martini
- Aleurocanthus niger
- Aleurocanthus nigricans
- Aleurocanthus piperis
- Aleurocanthus spiniferus
- Aleurocanthus woglumi
- Aleuroclava selvakumarani
- Aleuroclava srilankaensis
- Aleurodicus antidesmae
- Aleurolobus flavus
- Aleurolobus greeni
- Aleurolobus marlatti
- Aleurolobus setigerus
- Aleuroplatus incisus
- Aleuroplatus pectiniferus
- Aleuroplatus premnae
- Aleuroplatus spina
- Aleurotrachelus longispinus
- Aleyrodes hyperici
- Bemisia tabaci
- Crescentaleyrodes semilunaris
- Dialeurodes citri
- Dialeurodes decempuncta
- Dialeurodes dissimilis
- Dialeurodes ixorae
- Dialeurodes loranthi
- Dialeurodes radiilinealis
- Dialeurodes radiipuncta
- Dialeurolonga maculata
- Dialeuropora decempuncta
- Laingiella bambusae
- Minutaleyrodes minuta
- Neomaskellia andropogonis
- Orientaleyrodes zeylanicus
- Pealius nelsoni
- Rhachisphora capitatis
- Rhachisphora rutherfordi
- Rhachisphora setulosa
- Rhachisphora trilobitoides
- Tetraleurodes psidii
- Tetraleurodes rugosus
- Vasdavidius setiferus
- Zaphanera cyanotis

=== Family: Alydidae - broad-headed bugs ===
- Dulichius inflatus

=== Family: Aphalaridae ===
- Ctenarytaina eucalypti

=== Family: Aphrophoridae - spittlebugs ===
- Clovia lineatocollis
- Poophilus costalis
- Ptyelus declaratus

=== Family: Aradidae - flat bugs ===
- Aneurus greeni
- Mezira membranacea
- Neuroctenus hyalinipennis
- Singhalaptera secunda
- Signocoris nilgiricus

=== Family: Asterolecaniidae - pit scales ===
- Amorphococcus mesuae
- Asterolecanium bella
- Asterolecanium coronatum
- Asterolecanium epidendri
- Asterolecanium miliaris
- Bambusaspis bambusae
- Bambusaspis delicatum
- Bambusaspis longa
- Bambusaspis longum
- Bambusaspis miliaris
- Bambusaspis pseudomiliaris
- Bambusaspis solenophoroides
- Polea ceylonica

=== Family: Belostomatidae - giant water bugs ===
- Diplonychus rusticus
- Lethocerus indicus

=== Family: Berytidae - stilt bugs ===
- Metacanthus pulchellus

=== Family: Caliscelidae - piglet bugs ===
- Chirodisca eximia
- Lasonia kirkaldyi
- Pterilia ceylonensis
- Pterilia piceata
- Pterilia signata
- Pterygoma nasuta
- Symplana viridinervis

=== Family: Calophyidae ===
- Calophya spondiasae

=== Family: Carsidaridae ===
- Leptynoptera lanka
- Mesohomotoma lutheri
- Tenaphalara acutipennis

=== Family: Cercopidae - froghoppers ===
- Caloscarta capitata
- Caloscarta pallescens
- Cosmoscarta affinis
- Cosmoscarta egeria
- Cosmoscarta greeni
- Cosmoscarta heroina
- Cosmoscarta inconspicua
- Cosmoscarta taprobanensis
- Eoscarta apicata
- Homalostethus tennanti
- Leptataspis inclusa
- Rhinastria bicolor

=== Family: [erococcidae - ornate pit scales ===
- Cerococcus albospicatus
- Cerococcus indicus
- Cerococcus koebelei
- Cerococcus ornatus
- Cerococcus roseus

=== Family: Cicadellidae - leafhoppers ===
- Acacimenus zeylonicus
- Aconura colombensis
- Acostemma walkeri
- Agallia biplagiata
- Aidola erota
- Aidola orbata
- Alebroides bidens
- Amrasca apicoserrata
- Amrasca biguttula
- Amrasca bombaxia
- Amrasca pringlei
- Amrasca splendens
- Amritodus atkinsoni
- Anatkina helena
- Apheliona bioculata
- Asepodiva ihana
- Austroagallia nitobei
- Baguoidea rufa
- Balbillus granulosus
- Balclutha punctata
- Balclutha rubrostriatus
- Balocha astutus
- Banus oblatus
- Batracomorphus chlorophana
- Batracomorphus indica
- Batracomorphus piceatus
- Bhatia distanti
- Bhatia olivaceus
- Calodia ostentus
- Calodia paraostenta
- Carvaka dolens
- Cerkira angusta
- Cestius sellatus
- Changwhania ceylonensis
- Chatura nigella
- Chiasmus uzelii
- Cicadula vaga
- Coelidia atkinsoni
- Confucius bituberculatus
- Cubnara currax
- Deltocephalus fuscovarius
- Deltocephalus rufolineatus
- Deltocephalus scriptus
- Deltocephalus transparipennis
- Deltocephalus variegatus
- Destinoides latifrons
- Diomma ochracea
- Divus bipunctatus
- Doratulina laetus
- Doratulina solitaris
- Doratulina verticus
- Dorycnia funeta
- Dorycnia melichari
- Dorycnia mirabilis
- Drabescus angulatus
- Drabescus conspicuus
- Drabescus stramineus
- Dussana quaerenda
- Empoasca amasa
- Empoasca cona
- Empoasca kudlata
- Empoasca lautereri
- Empoasca malliki
- Empoasca motti
- Empoasca spirosa
- Empoasca tanova
- Empoasca triangularis
- Empoascanara cilla
- Empoascanara fumigata
- Empoascanara maculifrons
- Empoascanara nigrobimaculata
- Empoascanara prima
- Empoascanara regularis
- Empoascanara sathyamangalamensis
- Empoascanara sordida
- Eogypona kirbyi
- Eutettix apricus
- Exitianus capicola
- Exitianus fusconervosus
- Gambialoa cellularis
- Gambialoa finita
- Gambialoa nigra
- Gambialoa stubbsi
- Glossocratus greeni
- Goniagnathus nervosus
- Goniagnathus punctifer
- Gunghuyana cingalensis
- Haranga scutellaris
- Hecalus nervosus
- Heliona constricta
- Helionides exsultans
- Hishimonus apricus
- Hishimonus arcuatus
- Hishimonus discigutta
- Hishimonus dividens
- Hishimonus nielsoni
- Homa haematoptila
- Idioscopus nigroclypeatus
- Idioscopus niveosparsus
- Ifuaria pallida
- Ifugoa media
- Igerna bimaculicollis
- Jacobiasca boninensis
- Jacobiasca formosana
- Jacobiasca lybica
- Jacobiasca melichari
- Jacobiasca renschi
- Jassargus infirmus
- Kamaza sadakorni
- Kana decora
- Kana fasciata
- Kana ordinata
- Kana ramificata
- Kana thoracica
- Kapsa cerna
- Kapsa vana
- Koperta nidogra
- Krisna kirbyi
- Kutara brunnescens
- Kutara transversa
- Lampridius spectabilis
- Lankama pringeli
- Lankasca centromaculata
- Lectotypella rawa
- Ledra cingalensis
- Ledra dilatata
- Ledra intermedia
- Ledra rugosa
- Ledra sublata
- Ledropsis obligens
- Ledropsis producta
- Ledropsis punctulata
- Ledropsis singalensis
- Leofa curtulus
- Linnavuoriella arcuatus
- Litura unda
- Macropsis ceylonica
- Malichus capitatus
- Matsumurina communis
- Megabyzus signandus
- Mimotettix albomaculatus
- Mimotettix lateralis
- Mizeria chimera
- Molopopterus ni
- Motschulskyia inspirata
- Motschulskyia serrata
- Mukaria penthimioides
- Nehela atrovenosa
- Neoaliturus guttulatus
- Neodartus acocephaloides
- Neodartus rufopunctatus
- Neodartus scutellatus
- Nephotettix malayanus
- Nephotettix nigropicta
- Nephotettix parvus
- Nephotettix sympatricus
- Niedoida atrifrons
- Nimabanana rawana
- Parallygus divaricatus
- Paramesodes matalae
- Pedioscopus unimaculatus
- Penthimia erebus
- Penthimia juno
- Penthimia melanocephala
- Penthimia vittatifrons
- Periacerus lankensis
- Petalocephala bicolor
- Petalocephala chlorocephala
- Petalocephala confusa
- Petalocephala conica
- Petalocephala glauca
- Petalocephala nigrilinea
- Petalocephala perductalis
- Petalocephala remota
- Petalocephala tabulata
- Petalocephala uniformis
- Petalocephala walkeri
- Platyretus marginatus
- Pratura ceylona
- Preta gratiosa
- Pythamus dealbatus
- Qadria rubronotata
- Rawania petasata
- Recilia dorsalis
- Recilia elongatoocellatus
- Recilia intermedius
- Scaphoideus elegantalus
- Scaphoideus festivus
- Scaphoideus fletcheri
- Scaphoideus morosus
- Scaphoideus notatus
- Scaphoideus ornatus
- Scaphoideus punctulatus
- Scaphoideus sculptellus
- Seriana jaina
- Seriana sagara
- Signoretia greeni
- Sikkimasca annulata
- Tambila conspersa
- Tambila fletcheri
- Tambila greeni
- Tambila opulenta
- Tautoneura tripunctula
- Thagria brincki
- Thagria fasciata
- Thagria fryeri
- Thagria introducta
- Thagria luridus
- Thagria signata
- Thagria simulata
- Thagria srilankensis
- Thaia drutoidea
- Thaia lankaensis
- Thaia perfecta
- Thaia subrufa
- Thaia vulgaris
- Thamnotettix cicur
- Thamnotettix greeni
- Thamnotettix latruncularius
- Thomsoniella apicalis
- Tituria planata
- Trifida melichari
- Ujna delicatula
- Ujna exigua
- Ujna gagatina
- Uzeldikra citrina
- Uzelina laticeps
- Vulturnus ornatus
- Vulturnus speciosus
- Xestocephalus apicalis
- Xestocephalus guttulatus
- Xestocephalus paganurus
- Znana notata
- Zyginella insecata
- Zyginella pulchra
- Zyginella vietnamica
- Zyginopsis horizontalis
- Zyginopsis verticalis

=== Family: Cixiidae - cixiid planthoppers ===
- Andes elongatus
- Andes geometrinus
- Andes meander
- Andes nubilus
- Brixia tortriciformis
- Cixius pilifer
- Eucarpia arcuigera
- Eucarpia fasciata
- Eucarpia insignis
- Indolipa greeni
- Kirbyana pagana
- Mundopa balteata
- Mundopa cingalensis
- Mundopa dohertyi
- Mundopa greeni
- Mundopa sita
- Oliarus cingalensis
- Oliarus distanti
- Oliarus nuwarae
- Oliarus stigma
- Oliarus tabrobanensis
- Oliparisca pundaloyensis

=== Family: Coccidae - soft scales ===
- Ceronema fryeri
- Ceronema koebeli
- Ceroplastes actiniformis
- Ceroplastes destructor
- Ceroplastes dugesii
- Ceroplastes floridensis
- Ceroplastes pseudoceriferus
- Ceroplastes rubens
- Ceroplastes sinensis
- Coccus antidesmae
- Coccus asiaticus
- Coccus capparidis
- Coccus discrepans
- Coccus formicarii
- Coccus gymnospori
- Coccus hesperidum
- Coccus hesperidum
- Coccus illuppalamae
- Coccus latioperculatum
- Coccus litzeae
- Coccus longulus
- Coccus ophiorrhizae
- Coccus viridis
- Cribrolecanium formicarum
- Ctenochiton cinnamomi
- Ctenochiton fryeri
- Ctenochiton olivaceum
- Dicyphococcus castilloae
- Drepanococcus cajani
- Drepanococcus chiton
- Drepanococcus virescens
- Eucalymnatus tessellatus
- Inglisia chelonioides
- Kilifia acuminate
- Maacoccus arundinariae
- Maacoccus bicruciatus
- Maacoccus piperis subsp. namunakuli
- Marsipococcus iceryoides
- Marsipococcus marsupialis
- Megapulvinaria maxima
- Membranaria ceylonica
- Milviscutulus mangiferae
- Neolecanium cinnamomi
- Neolecanium pseudoleae
- Neoplatylecanium tripartitum
- Paralecanium calophylli
- Paralecanium geometricum
- Paralecanium limbatum
- Paralecanium mancum
- Paralecanium marginatum
- Paralecanium maritimum
- Paralecanium paradeniyense
- Paralecanium planum
- Paralecanium quadratum
- Paralecanium trifasciatum
- Paralecanium zonatum
- Parasaissetia nigra
- Platylecanium fusiforme
- Platysaissetia crustuliforme
- Prococcus acutissimus
- Protopulvinaria longivalvata
- Pulvinaria ixorae
- Pulvinaria polygonata
- Pulvinaria psidii
- Pulvinaria tenuivalvata
- Pulvinaria tessellata
- Pulvinaria tomentosa
- Pulvinaria urbicola
- Saissetia coffeae
- Saissetia privigna
- Tectopulvinaria farinose
- Vinsonia stellifera

=== Family: Conchaspididae - false armored scales ===
- Conchaspis socialis

=== Family: Coreidae - squash bugs ===
- Mictis longicornis

=== Family: Corixidae - water boatmen ===
- Micronecta anatolica
- Micronecta grisea
- Micronecta quadristrigata
- Sigara scutellaris
- Synaptonecta issa

=== Family: Cydnidae - burrowing bugs ===
- Aethus indicus
- Cydnus aterrimus
- Fromundus pygmaeus

=== Family: Cymidae ===
- Cymodema basicornis
- Cymoninus sechellensis
- Ontiscus vitiensis

=== Family: Dactylopiidae - cochineals ===
- Dactylopius ceylonicus
- Dactylopius confusus
- Dactylopius opuntiae
- Planococcus lilacinus

=== Family: Delphacidae - delphacid planthoppers ===
- Altekon charcamis
- Anectopia mandane
- Arcofacies truncatipennis
- Cemus granulinervis
- Cemus pulchellus
- Cemus sauteri
- Eodelphax serendiba
- Epeurysa nawaii
- Epeurysa stigma
- Euconon astarte
- Euidellana celadon
- Falcotoya citipes
- Hagamiodes meator
- Harmalia anacharsis
- Harmalia heitensis subsp. otho
- Harmalia tarasco
- Harmalia thoracica
- Harmalia tiphys
- Horcoma colorata
- Indozuriel samiator
- Matutinus melichari
- Metadelphax propinqua
- Nanotoya alboguttata
- Necodan zimara
- Nilaparvata bakeri
- Nilaparvata chaeremon
- Nilaparvata lugens
- Nothokalpa salome
- Nycheuma cognatum
- Opiconsiva albicollis
- Opiconsiva dodona
- Paranda globiceps
- Peliades nigropunctatus
- Peregrinus simplicia
- Phacalastor anaxarete
- Rhombotoya pseudonigripennis
- Sardia pluto
- Sardia rostrata
- Smicrotatodelphax iota
- Smicrotatodelphax maenobora
- Smicrotatodelphax stasander
- Sogata vatrenus
- Sogatella furcifera
- Sogatella kolophon
- Sogatodes candiope
- Sogatodes sternalis
- Stenocranus oroba
- Stenocranus polenor
- Syndelphax agametor
- Syndelphax disonymos
- Syndelphax euonymus
- Syndelphax euroclydon
- Tagosodes pusanus
- Terthron albomarginatum
- Toya attenuata
- Toya beninu
- Toya cularo
- Toya larymna
- Toya minutula
- Toya peruda
- Toya siaka
- Toya tuberculosa
- Tropidocephala brunnipennis
- Tropidocephala festiva
- Tropidocephala saccharivorella
- Tropidocephala serendiba
- Ulanar muiri

=== Family: Derbidae - derbid planthoppers ===
- Alara obscura
- Archara typica
- Banksiella elegantula
- Derbe crenatonervosa
- Helcita nitagalensis
- Interamma rubrofasciata
- Kamendaka fuscofasciata
- Kamendaka maculosa
- Kamendaka maskeliyae
- Kamendaka spectra
- Kamendaka vittata
- Neozoraida fletcheri
- Neozoraida gilva
- Neozoraida motschoulskyi
- Neozoraida obsoleta
- Pamendanga distanti
- Pamendanga punctativentris
- Perandenina typica
- Phra amplificata
- Proutista furcatovittata
- Rhotana albata
- Rhotana fuscofasciata
- Rhotana stali
- Rhotana trimaculata
- Rhotana vitriceps
- Robigus sanguineus
- Saccharodite basipunctulata
- Saccharodite iridipennis
- Sumangala delicatula
- Vekunta tenella
- Vinata nigricornis
- Zoraida ceylonica
- Zoraida egregia
- Zoraida ficta
- Zoraida kirkaldyi
- Zoraida lankana
- Zoraida pterophoroides
- Zoraida rufivena

=== Family: Diaspididae - armored scale insects ===
- Abgrallaspis cyanophylli
- Adiscofiorinia atalantiae
- Adiscofiorinia secreta
- Andaspis antidesmae
- Andaspis hawaiiensis
- Andaspis vandae
- Aonidia crenulata
- Aonidia echinata
- Aonidia loranthi
- Aonidia mimusopis
- Aonidia obscura
- Aonidia perplexa
- Aonidia planchoniodes
- Aonidia planchonioides
- Aonidia pusilla
- Aonidia spatulata
- Aonidiella citrina
- Aonidiella orientalis
- Aonidiella pothi
- Aonidiella taxus
- Aonidomytilus albus
- Aspidiella panici
- Aspidiella sacchari
- Aspidiotus destructor
- Aspidiotus excisus
- Aspidiotus nerii
- Aspidiotus putearius
- Aulacaspis bambusae
- Aulacaspis calcarata
- Aulacaspis elaeagni
- Aulacaspis fagraeae
- Aulacaspis fagreae
- Aulacaspis hedyotidis
- Aulacaspis heneratgoda
- Aulacaspis herbae
- Aulacaspis litzeae
- Aulacaspis loranthi
- Aulacaspis madiunensis
- Aulacaspis orientalis
- Aulacaspis phoenicis
- Aulacaspis tubercularis
- Aulacaspis uncinati
- Bigymnaspis bullata
- Chionaspis saitamaensis
- Chrysomphalus aonidum
- Chrysomphalus dictyospermi
- Chrysomphalus pinnulifer
- Circulaspis canaliculata
- Contigaspis coimbatorensis
- Contigaspis cyanogena
- Coronaspis coronifera
- Cryptophyllaspis elongata
- Cryptophyllaspis occulta
- Diaspis antiquorum
- Diaspis boisduvalii
- Diaspis mihiriya
- Diaspis myristicae
- Dinaspis dilatilobis
- Duplachionaspis divergens
- Duplachionaspis graminis
- Duplaspidiotus claviger
- Duplaspidiotus fossor
- Duplaspidiotus quadriclavatus
- Duplaspidiotus tesseratus
- Fiorinia bidens
- Fiorinia fioriniae
- Fiorinia gelonii
- Fiorinia japonica
- Fiorinia kandyensis
- Fiorinia odinae
- Fiorinia pinicola
- Fiorinia proboscidaria
- Fiorinia rubrolineata
- Fiorinia scrobicularum
- Fiorinia similis
- Fiorinia taiwana
- Fiorinia theae
- Fiorinia tumida
- Fiorinia turpiniae
- Froggattiella inusitata
- Froggattiella penicillata
- Furcaspis biformis
- Furchadaspis zamiae
- Genaparlatoria pseudaspidiotus
- Gomphaspidiotus cuculus
- Greenaspis arundinariae
- Greenaspis elongata
- Greeniella columnifera
- Greeniella cornigera
- Greeniella ferreae
- Greeniella mesuae
- Greenoidea phyllanthi
- Gymnaspis spinomarginata
- Hemiberlesia lataniae
- Hemiberlesia palmae
- Hemiberlesia rapax
- Howardia biclavis
- Insulaspis lasianthi
- Ischaspis longirostris
- Ischnaspis longirostris
- Kuwanaspis linearis
- Ledaspis atalantiae
- Lepidosaphes ambigua
- Lepidosaphes beckii
- Lepidosaphes cocculi
- Lepidosaphes gloverii
- Lepidosaphes pallidula
- Lepidosaphes piperis
- Lepidosaphes rubrovittata
- Lepidosaphes tokionis
- Lindingaspis fusca
- Lindingaspis greeni
- Lindingaspis mackenziei
- Lindingaspis rossi
- Lopholeucaspis cockerelli
- Lopholeucaspis limoniae
- Morganella longispina
- Mycetaspis personata
- Nudachaspis fodiens
- Octaspidiotus calophylli
- Odonaspis greenii
- Odonaspis panici
- Odonaspis ruthae
- Odonaspis saccharicaulis
- Odonaspis secreta
- Odonaspis serrata
- Parachionaspis galliformens
- Paraonidia malleola
- Paraonidia melleola
- Parlatoria aonidiformis
- Parlatoria atalantiae
- Parlatoria cingala
- Parlatoria cingali
- Parlatoria cinnamomi
- Parlatoria mesuae
- Parlatoria mytilaspiformis
- Parlatoria mytilaspisformis
- Parlatoria namunakuli
- Parlatoria oleae
- Parlatoria phyllanthi
- Parlatoria proteus
- Parlatoria rutherfordi
- Parlatoria serrula
- Parlatoria ziziphi
- Pinnaspis alatae
- Pinnaspis albizziae
- Pinnaspis aspidastrae
- Pinnaspis buxi
- Pinnaspis dracaenae
- Pinnaspis exercitata
- Pinnaspis muntingi
- Pinnaspis mussaendae
- Pinnaspis rhododendri
- Pinnaspis scrobicularum
- Pinnaspis strachani
- Pinnaspis theae
- Poliaspoides formosana
- Porogymnaspis mesochitinosa
- Proceraspis cinnamomi
- Pseudaonidia irrepta
- Pseudaonidia trilobitiformis
- Pseudaulacaspis barberi
- Pseudaulacaspis cockerelli
- Pseudaulacaspis ernesti
- Pseudaulacaspis eugeniae
- Pseudaulacaspis gynandropsidis
- Pseudaulacaspis megaloba
- Pseudaulacaspis polygoni
- Pseudaulacaspis simplex
- Pseudaulacaspis strobilanthi
- Pseudaulacaspis subcorticalis
- Pseudaulacaspis tenera
- Pseudaulacaspis varicosa
- Pseudoparlatoria ostreata
- Pseudoparlatoria serrulata
- Quernaspis quercus
- Rutherfordia major
- Rutherfordia malloti
- Selenaspidus articulatus
- Semelaspidus ambalangoda
- Semelaspidus artocarpi
- Tenuiaspis minuta
- Unaspis acuminata
- Unaspis atricolor
- Unaspis flava
- Unaspis permutans

=== Family: Dictyopharidae - dictyopharid planthoppers ===
- Avephora brachycephala
- Dichoptera hampsoni
- Dictyopharina viridissima
- Orthopagus splendens
- Pibrocha egregia
- Putala rostrata
- Truncatomeria viridistigma

=== Family: Dinidoridae ===
- Coridius janus
- Cyclopelta obscura

=== Family: Eriococcidae - felt scales ===
- Eriococcus araucariae subsp. araucariae
- Eriococcus bambusae
- Eriococcus nuerae
- Eriococcus osbeckiae
- Eriococcus rhodomyrti
- Eriococcus tenuis
- Eriococcus transversus
- Lachnodiopsis humboldtiae

=== Family: Eurybrachidae ===
- Nicidus fusconebulosus

=== Family: Flatidae - flatid planthoppers ===
- Adelidoria pulverulenta
- Anaya conflicta
- Anaya proxima
- Flata argiolus
- Flata ferrugata
- Gomeda abdominalis
- Hilavrita fatua
- Ketumala nigropunctata
- Melicharia conflicta
- Melicharia limbatus
- Ormenoides pehlkei
- Satapa sicula

=== Family: Fulgoridae - lanternflies ===
- Kalidasa sanguinalis
- Laternaria maculata
- Laternaria oculata
- Omalocephala festiva
- Polydictya pantherina
- Pyrops maculatus subsp. fulvirostris
- Zanna dohrni

=== Family: Geocoridae - big-eyed bugs ===
- Geocoris ochropterus

=== Family: Gerridae - water striders ===
- Neogerris parvulus
- Rhagadotarsus kraepelini

=== Family: Halimococcidae - pupillarial palm scales ===
- Colobopyga kewensis

=== Family: Issidae - issid planthoppers ===
- Gergithus bipustulatus subsp. brunneus
- Gergithus dubius
- Gergithus schaumi
- Narayana rusticitatis
- Narayana testudo
- Pavelauterum fusculum
- Sarima cretata
- Sarima elongata
- Sarima illibata

=== Family: Kerriidae - lac insects ===
- Kerria albizziae
- Kerria lacca
- Metatachardia conchiferata
- Paratachardina lobata

=== Family: Kinnaridae - kinnarid planthoppers ===
- Kinnara ceylonica

=== Family: Largidae - bordered plant bugs ===
- Ochterus marginatus

=== Family: Lecanodiaspididae - false pit scales ===
- Anomalococcus crematogastri
- Cosmococcus mimusopis
- Lecanodiaspis malaboda
- Stictacanthus azadirachtae

=== Family: Liviidae ===
- Diaphorina citri
- Paurocephala psylloptera

=== Family: Lophopidae ===
- Pyrilla aberrans subsp. aberrans
- Pyrilla perpusilla subsp. singhalensis

=== Family: Lygaeidae - milkweed bugs ===
- Arocatus continctus
- Graptostethus servus
- Lygaeus quadratomaculatus
- Macropes privus
- Pachyphylegyas modigliani
- Spilostethus hospes

=== Family: Machaerotidae - tube spittlebugs ===
- Machaeropsis valida
- Machaerota punctatonervosa
- Soa flaviterminata

=== Family: Malcidae ===
- Chauliops lobatula

=== Family: Meenoplidae ===
- Kermesia albida
- Nisia campbelli
- Phaconeura fletcheri
- Suva albiplaga

=== Family: Membracidae - typical treehoppers ===
- Anchon brevis
- Anchon dirce
- Anchon pilosus
- Anchon rectangulatus
- Bathoutha indicans
- Bocchar incultus
- Bocchar nuwarana
- Bocchar pallescens
- Centrotus angustulus
- Centrotus bioculatus
- Centrotus granulatus
- Centrotus kelloggi
- Centrotus ramosus
- Coccosterphus minuta
- Coccosterphus obscurus
- Cryptaspidia ferrugata
- Cryptaspidia piceola
- Emphusis obesus
- Eucoccosterphus mucronicollis
- Eucoccosterphus tuberculatus
- Gargara apicata
- Gargara extrema
- Gargara flavolineata
- Gargara mixtus
- Gargara sericea
- Gargara tumida
- Hemicentrus aculeata
- Hypsauchenia hardwickii
- Indicopleustes albomaculatus
- Indicopleustes curvatus
- Leptocentrus leucaspis
- Leptocentrus reponens
- Leptocentrus substitutus
- Leptocentrus taurus
- Leptocentrus terminalis
- Leptocentrus ustus
- Maarbarus bubalus
- Maguva horrida
- Maguva typicus
- Otinotus indicatus
- Otinotus oneratus
- Oxyrhachis crinitus
- Oxyrhachis fuscicornis
- Oxyrhachis inermis
- Oxyrhachis taranda
- Oxyrhachis uncata
- Parapogon insignis
- Parapogon kandyiana
- Pogon albosignatum
- Pogon atricoxis
- Pogon auriculatus
- Pogon cupreus
- Pogon ferrugineus
- Pogon incurvatum
- Pogontypus complicatus
- Pogontypus dissimilis
- Pogontypus horvathi
- Postanomus reticulatus
- Telingana curvispinus
- Telingana decipiens
- Telingana flavipes
- Telingana imitator
- Tricentrus basalis
- Tricentrus kamaonensis
- Xiphopoeus vomeris
- Yasa greeni

=== Family: Miridae - plant bugs ===
- Argenis incisuratus
- Bertsa lankana
- Campylomma lividum
- Cyrtorhinus lividipennis
- Dolichomiris linearis
- Hallodapus albofasciatus
- Halticus bractatus
- Moissonia punctata
- Opuna annulata
- Pilophorus typicus
- Prodromus clypeatus
- Singhalesia obscuricornis
- Sthenaridea piceonigra
- Trigonotylus tenuis
- Tytthus chinensis

=== Family: Monophlebidae - giant scales ===
- Drosicha quadricaudata
- Drosicha variegata
- Hemaspidoproctus cinereus
- Hemaspidoproctus euphorbiae
- Hemaspidoproctus senex
- Icerya aegyptiaca
- Icerya pilosa
- Icerya purchasi
- Labioproctus poleii
- Neogreenia zeylanica
- Nietnera pundaluoya
- Perissopneumon phyllanthi
- Walkeriana compacta
- Walkeriana floriger
- Walkeriana furcatus
- Walkeriana ovilla

=== Family: Naucoridae - creeping water bugs ===
- Diaphorocoris punctatissimus
- Naucoris congrex
- Pelocoris femoratus

=== Family: Nepidae - waterscorpions ===
- Laccotrephes griseus
- Laccotrephes simulatus
- Ranatra elongata
- Ranatra filiformis
- Ranatra longipes
- Ranatra sordidula
- Ranatra varipes

=== Family: Ochteridae - velvety shore bugs ===
- Ochterus marginatus

=== Family: Ortheziidae - ensign scales ===
- Insignorthezia insignis

=== Family: Oxycarenidae ===
- Oxycarenus bicolor
- Oxycarenus laetus
- Oxycarenus lugubris

=== Family: Pachygronthidae ===
- Pachygrontha bipunctata
- Pachygrontha nigrovittata

=== Family: Pentatomidae - stink bugs ===
- Bagrada hilaris
- Catacanthus incarnatus
- Eysarcoris guttigerus
- Menida formosa
- Nezara viridula
- Spermatodes variolosus

=== Family: Plataspidae ===
- Brachyplatys subaeneus

=== Family: Pseudococcidae - mealybugs ===
- Antonina maritima
- Antonina zonata
- Antoninoides parrotti
- Brevennia pulveraria
- Chaetococcus bambusae
- Chorizococcus kandyensis
- Coccidohystrix insolita
- Dysmicoccus aciculus
- Dysmicoccus brevipes
- Dysmicoccus carens
- Dysmicoccus finitimus
- Dysmicoccus neobrevipes
- Erioides cuneiformis
- Erioides rimulae
- Farinococcus formicarii
- Farinococcus simplicior
- Ferrisia malvastra
- Ferrisia virgata
- Geococcus coffeae
- Geococcus radicum
- Lachnodiopsis humboldtiae
- Lankacoccus ornatus
- Maconellicoccus hirsutus
- Nipaecoccus viridis
- Paracoccus citri
- Paracoccus marginatus
- Paracoccus minor
- Pedronia strobilanthis
- Pedronia tenuispina
- Phenacoccus solenopsis
- Planococcus lilacinus
- Pseudantonina bambusae
- Pseudococcus cryptus
- Pseudococcus debregeasiae
- Pseudococcus longispinus
- Pseudococcus monticola
- Pseudococcus neomaritimus
- Pseudococcus scrobicularum
- Pseudococcus viburni
- Rastrococcus biggeri
- Rastrococcus iceryoides
- Rastrococcus invadens
- Rastrococcus mangiferae
- Rastrococcus taprobanicus
- Rhizoecus bacorum
- Saccharicoccus sacchari
- Trionymus bambusae

=== Family: Psyllidae - jumping plant lice ===
- Euphalerus isitis
- Heteropsylla cubana

=== Family: Pyrrhocoridae - cotton stainers ===
- Melamphaus rubidus

=== Family: Reduviidae - thread-legged bugs ===
- Bagauda aelleni

=== Family: Rhyparochromidae - seed bugs ===
- Pachybrachius pacificus
- Paromius gracilis

=== Family: Saldidae - shore bugs ===
- Saldoida armata

=== Family: Scutelleridae - jewel bugs ===
- Chrysocoris stockerus
- Chrysocoris stollii
- Hotea curculionoides
- Scutellera perplexa

=== Family: Tettigometridae ===
- Egropa inusta

=== Family: Tingidae - lace bugs ===
- Abdastartus atrus
- Aconchus urbanus
- Agramma ambiguum
- Agramma carinatum
- Agramma danielssoni
- Agramma gibbum
- Agramma sedale
- Baeochila dehrana
- Celantia vagans
- Cochlochila nilgiriensis
- Cysteochila taprobanes
- Cysteochila tingoides
- Diconocoris distanti
- Diconocoris greeni
- Dulinius conchatus
- Habrochila darthula
- Haedus cinghalensis
- Hegesidemus anderssoni
- Hegesidemus eliyanus
- Hurdchila mira
- Lasiacantha cuneata
- Paracopium cingalense
- Paracopium lewisi
- Phatnoma laciniata
- Sinalda coronata
- Stephanitis suffusa
- Stephanitis typica
- Urentius euonymus
- Urentius hystricellus

=== Family: Triozidae - jumping plant lice ===
- Baeoalitriozus obsoletus
- Pauropsylla depressa
- Trioza cinnamomi
- Trioza obsoleta
- Trioza vitiensis

=== Family: Tropiduchidae ===
- Leusaba rufitarsis
- Paruzelia psyllomorpha
- Paruzelia salome
- Tambinia languida
- Varma tridens

=== Family: Ulopidae ===
- Mesargus subopacus
