= Oxyrhachis binsara =

Scientific classification
- Kingdom: Animalia
- Phylum: Arthropoda
- Clade: Pancrustacea
- Class: Insecta
- Order: Hemiptera
- Suborder: Auchenorrhyncha
- Family: Membracidae
- Genus: Oxyrhachis
- Species: O. binsara

Binomial name
- Oxyrhachis binsara Distant, 1916

Species of insect

Oxyrhachis binsara is a species of treehoppers in the subfamily Centrotinae described by William Lucas Distant in 1916. It is found in Nepal.
