= Oxyrhachis nigropicta =

Scientific classification
- Kingdom: Animalia
- Phylum: Arthropoda
- Clade: Pancrustacea
- Class: Insecta
- Order: Hemiptera
- Suborder: Auchenorrhyncha
- Family: Membracidae
- Genus: Oxyrhachis
- Species: O. nigropicta

Binomial name
- Oxyrhachis nigropicta Distant, 1916

Species of insect

Oxyrhachis nigropicta is a species of treehoppers in the subfamily Centrotinae described by William Lucas Distant in 1916. It is found in Kenya.
