= Oxyrhachis gibbula =

Scientific classification
- Kingdom: Animalia
- Phylum: Arthropoda
- Clade: Pancrustacea
- Class: Insecta
- Order: Hemiptera
- Suborder: Auchenorrhyncha
- Family: Membracidae
- Genus: Oxyrhachis
- Species: O. gibbula

Binomial name
- Oxyrhachis gibbula Melichar, 1905

Species of insect

Oxyrhachis gibbula is a species of treehoppers in the subfamily Centrotinae described by Leopold Melichar in 1905. It is found widely throughout Africa .
