= Oxyrhachis attenuata =

Scientific classification
- Kingdom: Animalia
- Phylum: Arthropoda
- Clade: Pancrustacea
- Class: Insecta
- Order: Hemiptera
- Suborder: Auchenorrhyncha
- Family: Membracidae
- Genus: Oxyrhachis
- Species: O. attenuata

Binomial name
- Oxyrhachis attenuata Distant, 1915

Species of insect

Oxyrhachis attenuata is a species of treehoppers in the subfamily Centrotinae described by William Lucas Distant in 1915. It is found in South Africa, Zimbabwe, and Democratic Republic of the Congo.
