= Oxyrhachis punctata =

Scientific classification
- Kingdom: Animalia
- Phylum: Arthropoda
- Clade: Pancrustacea
- Class: Insecta
- Order: Hemiptera
- Suborder: Auchenorrhyncha
- Family: Membracidae
- Genus: Oxyrhachis
- Species: O. punctata

Binomial name
- Oxyrhachis punctata Ananthasubramanian, 1980

Species of insect

Oxyrhachis punctata is a species of treehoppers in the subfamily Centrotinae described by Ananthasubramanian in 1980. It is found in India.
