= Oxyrhachis ovicornuta =

Scientific classification
- Kingdom: Animalia
- Phylum: Arthropoda
- Clade: Pancrustacea
- Class: Insecta
- Order: Hemiptera
- Suborder: Auchenorrhyncha
- Family: Membracidae
- Genus: Oxyrhachis
- Species: O. ovicornuta

Binomial name
- Oxyrhachis ovicornuta Capener, 1962

Species of insect

Oxyrhachis ovicornuta is a species of treehoppers in the subfamily Centrotinae described by Alfred Lawrence Capener in 1962. It is found in Zimbabwe.
