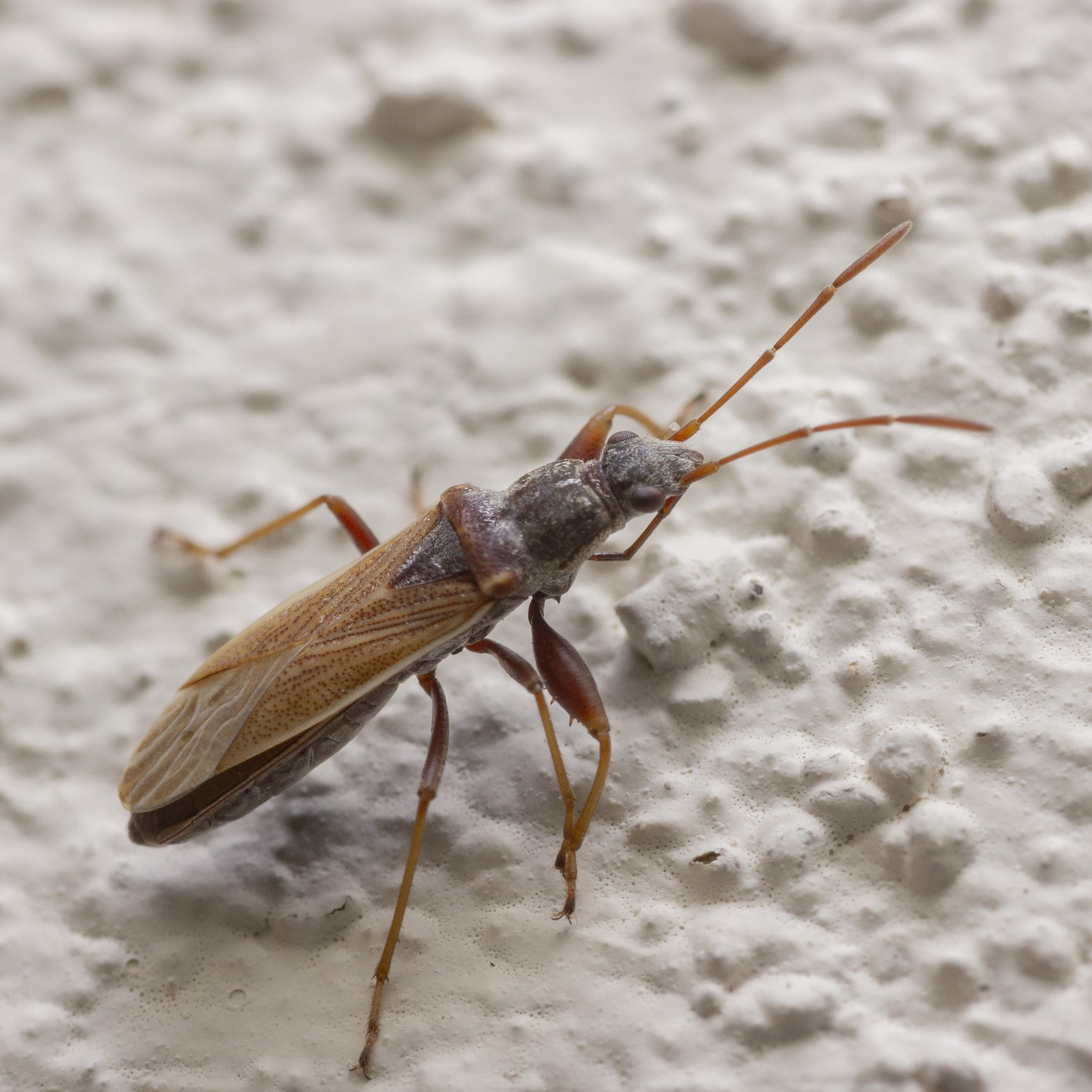
- Paromius procerulus

Scientific classification
- Kingdom: Animalia
- Phylum: Arthropoda
- Clade: Pancrustacea
- Class: Insecta
- Order: Hemiptera
- Suborder: Heteroptera
- Family: Rhyparochromidae
- Subfamily: Rhyparochrominae
- Tribe: Myodochini
- Genus: Paromius; Fieber, 1861

= Paromius =

Genus of true bugs

Paromius is a genus of dirt-colored seed bugs in the family Rhyparochromidae. There are about 15 described species in the genus Paromius.

== Species ==
These 15 species belong to the genus Paromius:

- Paromius apicatus (Stal, 1855);
- Paromius attenuatus (Dallas, 1852);
- Paromius australis Malipatil, 1978;
- Paromius carvalhoi Slater, 1995;
- Paromius dohrnii (Guerin-Meneville, 1857);
- Paromius excelsus Bergroth, 1924;
- Paromius exiguus (Distant, 1883);
- Paromius gracilis (Rambur, 1839);
- Paromius jejunus (Distant, 1883);
- Paromius limbatus (Stal, 1874);
- Paromius longulus (Dallas, 1852);
- Paromius paraclypeatus Scudder, 1969;
- Paromius piratoides (Costa, 1864);
- Paromius procerulus (Berg, 1892);
- Paromius trivialis (Stal, 1874).
