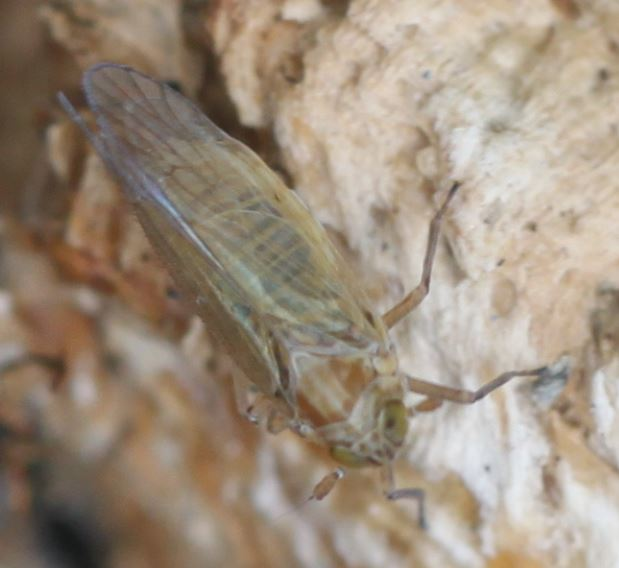
- Metadelphax propinqua

Scientific classification
- Domain: Eukaryota
- Kingdom: Animalia
- Phylum: Arthropoda
- Class: Insecta
- Order: Hemiptera
- Suborder: Auchenorrhyncha
- Infraorder: Fulgoromorpha
- Family: Delphacidae
- Tribe: Delphacini
- Genus: Metadelphax; Wagner, 1963

Species
- See text

= Metadelphax =

Genus of true bugs

Metadelphax is a genus of delphacid planthoppers in the family Delphacidae. There are at least five described species in Metadelphax.

== Species ==
- Metadelphax argentinensis (Muir, 1929)
- Metadelphax dentata (Gonzon and Bartlett, 2008)
- Metadelphax pero (Fennah, 1971)
- Metadelphax propinqua (Fieber, 1866)
- Metadelphax wetmorei (Muir & Giffard, 1924)
