= Oxyrhachis latipes =

Scientific classification
- Kingdom: Animalia
- Phylum: Arthropoda
- Clade: Pancrustacea
- Class: Insecta
- Order: Hemiptera
- Suborder: Auchenorrhyncha
- Family: Membracidae
- Genus: Oxyrhachis
- Species: O. latipes

Binomial name
- Oxyrhachis latipes Buckton, 1903

Synonyms
- Oxyrhachis bisenta Distant, 1915; Oxyrhachis bisenti Distant, 1915; Polocentrus caudatus Buckton, 1905; Oxyrhachis sursa Capener, 1960

Species of insect

Oxyrhachis latipes is a species of treehoppers in the subfamily Centrotinae described by Buckton in 1903. It is widespread throughout Africa.
