= Oxyrhachis mirei =

Scientific classification
- Kingdom: Animalia
- Phylum: Arthropoda
- Clade: Pancrustacea
- Class: Insecta
- Order: Hemiptera
- Suborder: Auchenorrhyncha
- Family: Membracidae
- Genus: Oxyrhachis
- Species: O. mirei

Binomial name
- Oxyrhachis mirei Boulard, 1979

Species of insect

Oxyrhachis mirei is a species of treehoppers in the subfamily Centrotinae described by Michel Boulard in 1979. It is found in Chad.
