= Oxyrhachis tricarina =

Scientific classification
- Kingdom: Animalia
- Phylum: Arthropoda
- Clade: Pancrustacea
- Class: Insecta
- Order: Hemiptera
- Suborder: Auchenorrhyncha
- Family: Membracidae
- Genus: Oxyrhachis
- Species: O. tricarina

Binomial name
- Oxyrhachis tricarina Capener, 1968

Species of insect

Oxyrhachis tricarina is a species of treehoppers in the subfamily Centrotinae described by Alfred Lawrence Capener in 1968. It is found in South Sudan.
