= Oxyrhachis exigua =

Scientific classification
- Kingdom: Animalia
- Phylum: Arthropoda
- Clade: Pancrustacea
- Class: Insecta
- Order: Hemiptera
- Suborder: Auchenorrhyncha
- Family: Membracidae
- Genus: Oxyrhachis
- Species: O. exigua

Binomial name
- Oxyrhachis exigua Buckton, 1903

Species of insect

Oxyrhachis exigua is a species of treehoppers in the subfamily Centrotinae described by George Bowdler Buckton in 1903. It is found in South Africa.
