= Oxyrhachis concolor =

Scientific classification
- Kingdom: Animalia
- Phylum: Arthropoda
- Clade: Pancrustacea
- Class: Insecta
- Order: Hemiptera
- Suborder: Auchenorrhyncha
- Family: Membracidae
- Genus: Oxyrhachis
- Species: O. concolor

Binomial name
- Oxyrhachis concolor Buckton, 1903

Species of insect

Oxyrhachis concolor is a species of treehoppers in the subfamily Centrotinae described by George Bowdler Buckton in 1903. It is found in South Africa and Zimbabwe.
