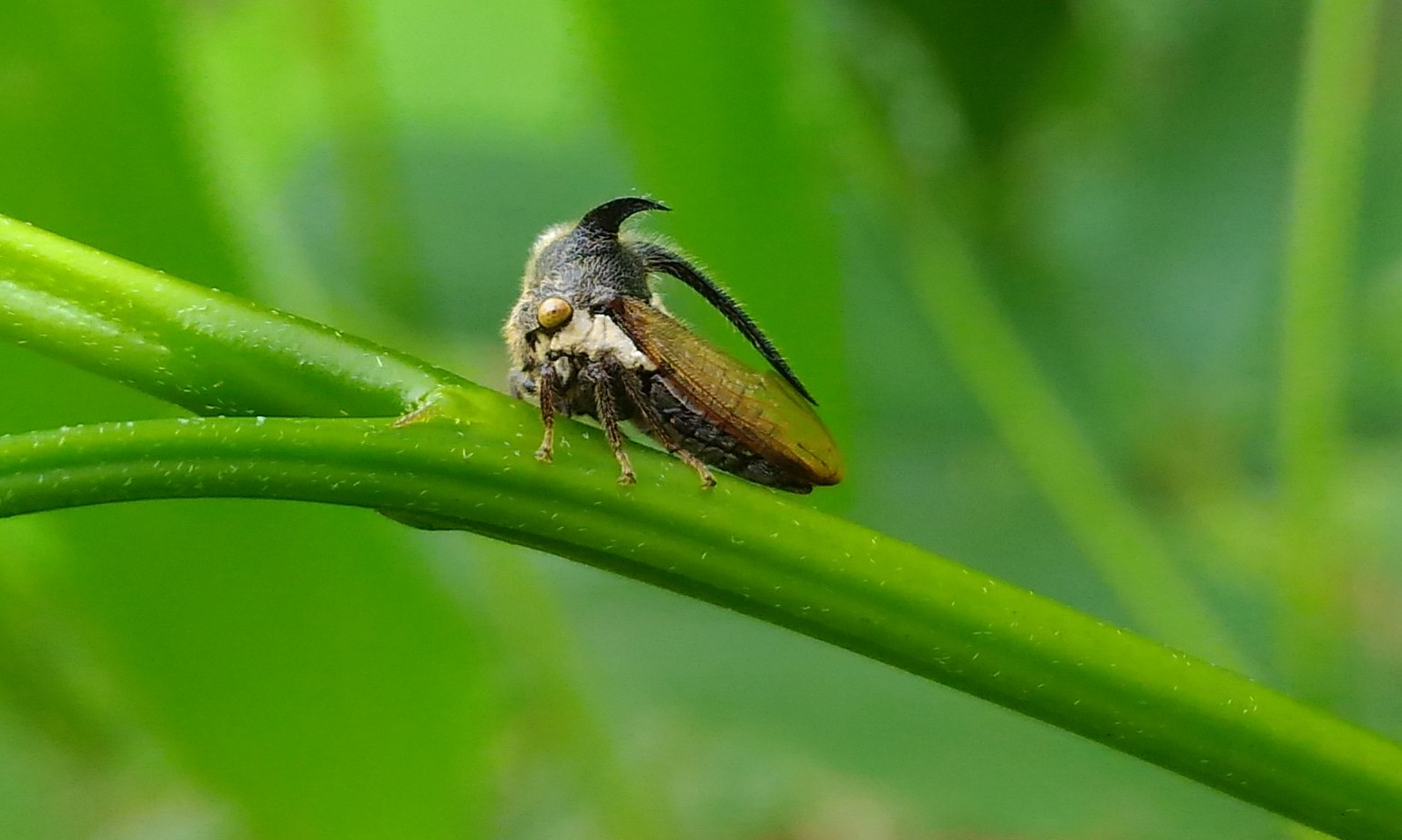
- Oxyrachis taranda

Scientific classification
- Kingdom: Animalia
- Phylum: Arthropoda
- Clade: Pancrustacea
- Class: Insecta
- Order: Hemiptera
- Suborder: Auchenorrhyncha
- Family: Membracidae
- Tribe: Oxyrhachini
- Genus: Oxyrhachis; Germar, 1833

Synonyms
- Gangroneura [sic] Jacobi, 1910; Gongroneura Jacobi, 1910; Kombazama [sic] Distant, 1908; Kombazana Distant, 1908; Neoxiphistes Distant, 1914; Ouranorthus Buckton, 1905; Oxyrhachidia Melichar, 1903; Pedalion Buckton, 1903; Polocentrus Buckton, 1903; Xiphidia Goding, 1930; Xiphistes Stål, 1866; Xiphistoides Goding, 1931

= Oxyrhachis (treehopper) =

Tribe of true bugs

Oxyrhachis is a genus of treehoppers in the subfamily Centrotinae. It was first described by Ernst Friedrich Germar in 1833, and is the only genus within the tribe Oxyrhachini.

== Description and distribution ==
Species in this genus have been recorded from Africa, South and S.E. Asia; they are typically 5-6.3 mm in length and are typically tan or dark brown.

== Species ==
The following species are recognized:

- Oxyrhachis abyssiniensis Capener, 1972
- Oxyrhachis acuminata Capener, 1962
- Oxyrhachis agrestis Capener, 1962
- Oxyrhachis amoena Capener, 1962
- Oxyrhachis ampliata Liang & McKamey, 1996
- Oxyrhachis angusta Capener, 1962
- Oxyrhachis apicalis Ananthasubramanian, 1980
- Oxyrhachis attenuata (Distant, 1915)
- Oxyrhachis balanites Boulard, 1979
- Oxyrhachis bestiola Capener, 1962
- Oxyrhachis biformis (Capener, 1951)
- Oxyrhachis binsara Distant, 1916
- Oxyrhachis brevicaudata Capener, 1962
- Oxyrhachis brevicornis (Jacobi, 1910)
- Oxyrhachis brevicornuta Ananthasubramanian & Ananthakrishnan, 1975
- Oxyrhachis brevis Capener, 1962
- Oxyrhachis brincki (Capener, 1960)
- Oxyrhachis bulla Liang & McKamey, 1996
- Oxyrhachis caligula Capener, 1962
- Oxyrhachis capeneri Izzard, 1953
- Oxyrhachis carinata (Funkhouser, 1927)
- Oxyrhachis concinna Capener, 1962
- Oxyrhachis concolor Buckton, 1903
- Oxyrhachis congoensis (Capener, 1957)
- Oxyrhachis contigua Capener, 1962
- Oxyrhachis crassa (Distant, 1916)
- Oxyrhachis crassicornis (Distant, 1915)
- Oxyrhachis crinita (Buckton, 1903)
- Oxyrhachis delalandei Fairmaire, 1846
- Oxyrhachis dilaticornis Walker, 1851
- Oxyrhachis distanti Capener, 1962
- Oxyrhachis dukei Capener, 1962
- Oxyrhachis egyptiana Distant, 1915
- Oxyrhachis erecta Capener, 1962
- Oxyrhachis exigua (Buckton, 1903)
- Oxyrhachis fastigata Capener, 1962
- Oxyrhachis fenestrata Capener, 1962
- Oxyrhachis fidelis (Distant, 1908)
- Oxyrhachis furva Capener, 1962
- Oxyrhachis fusca Capener, 1962
- Oxyrhachis fuscicornis Germar, 1835
- Oxyrhachis gambiae Fairmaire, 1846
- Oxyrhachis geniculata Ananthasubramanian, 1980
- Oxyrhachis gibbula Melichar, 1905
- Oxyrhachis gracilis Capener, 1962
- Oxyrhachis grandis Capener, 1962
- Oxyrhachis gubernaculata Capener, 1962
- Oxyrhachis haldari Ananthasubramanian, 1980
- Oxyrhachis hera Capener, 1962
- Oxyrhachis hoffmanni Capener, 1968
- Oxyrhachis hoggarensis Boulard, 1979
- Oxyrhachis hunti Capener, 1962
- Oxyrhachis imperialis Capener, 1962
- Oxyrhachis inermis Stål, 1870
- Oxyrhachis insularis (Capener, 1953)
- Oxyrhachis jacobii Capener, 1962
- Oxyrhachis jucunda Capener, 1962
- Oxyrhachis jugosa Capener, 1962
- Oxyrhachis krusadiensis Ananthasubramanian & Ananthakrishnan, 1975
- Oxyrhachis labata (Buckton, 1905)
- Oxyrhachis lagosensis (Distant, 1914)
- Oxyrhachis lamborni Distant, 1916
- Oxyrhachis laterula Boulard, 1979
- Oxyrhachis latipes (Buckton, 1903)
- Oxyrhachis latipesoides Boulard, 1979
- Oxyrhachis lefroyi Distant, 1916
- Oxyrhachis lepida (Capener, 1960)
- Oxyrhachis longicornis (Distant, 1908)
- Oxyrhachis maculipennis (Funkhouser, 1939)
- Oxyrhachis malabarica Ananthasubramanian, 1980
- Oxyrhachis mananga Capener, 1962
- Oxyrhachis mangiferana Distant, 1916
- Oxyrhachis minuscula Ananthasubramanian & Ananthakrishnan, 1975
- Oxyrhachis mirei Boulard, 1979
- Oxyrhachis moderata (Capener, 1960)
- Oxyrhachis monochroma Liang & McKamey, 1996
- Oxyrhachis munda Capener, 1962
- Oxyrhachis newtoni Capener, 1962
- Oxyrhachis nigra (Capener, 1960)
- Oxyrhachis nigricans Capener, 1962
- Oxyrhachis nigrodorsalis Ananthasubramanian, 1980
- Oxyrhachis nigropicta Distant, 1916
- Oxyrhachis nigrosignata Capener, 1962
- Oxyrhachis nupta Capener, 1962
- Oxyrhachis ovicornuta Capener, 1962
- Oxyrhachis palus (Buckton, 1905)
- Oxyrhachis pandata Distant, 1916
- Oxyrhachis phantasma Capener, 1962
- Oxyrhachis placita Capener, 1962
- Oxyrhachis prolixa Capener, 1972
- Oxyrhachis pubescens Capener, 1962
- Oxyrhachis punctata Ananthasubramanian, 1980
- Oxyrhachis regalis Capener, 1962
- Oxyrhachis rufescens Walker, 1851
- Oxyrhachis rufula Capener, 1962
- Oxyrhachis rusticana Capener, 1962
- Oxyrhachis serrata Ahmad & Abrar, 1974
- Oxyrhachis sinensis Yuan & Tian, 1993
- Oxyrhachis spinosa Capener, 1962
- Oxyrhachis suberecta Walker, 1851
- Oxyrhachis subjecta Walker, 1851
- Oxyrhachis subserrata Walker, 1851
- Oxyrhachis sulcicornis (Thunberg, 1822)
- Oxyrhachis taranda (Fabricius, 1798)
- Oxyrhachis tenebrosa (Walker, 1851)
- Oxyrhachis tessmanni Capener, 1972
- Oxyrhachis transvaalensis Capener, 1962
- Oxyrhachis tricarina Capener, 1968
- Oxyrhachis tuberculata Walker, 1858
- Oxyrhachis umbratica Capener, 1962
- Oxyrhachis uncata Melichar, 1903
- Oxyrhachis unicolor Walker, 1851
- Oxyrhachis variegata (Capener, 1960)
- Oxyrhachis versicolor Distant, 1915
- Oxyrhachis vetusta Walker, 1851
- Oxyrhachis yerburyi Distant, 1916
- Oxyrhachis zanzibarensis Capener, 1962
- Oxyrhachis zenobia Capener, 1962
