= Oxyrhachis gambiae =

Scientific classification
- Kingdom: Animalia
- Phylum: Arthropoda
- Clade: Pancrustacea
- Class: Insecta
- Order: Hemiptera
- Suborder: Auchenorrhyncha
- Family: Membracidae
- Genus: Oxyrhachis
- Species: O. gambiae

Binomial name
- Oxyrhachis gambiae Fairmaire, 1846

Species of insect

Oxyrhachis gambiae is a species of treehoppers in the subfamily Centrotinae described by Léon Fairmaire in 1846. It is found in West Africa, including Nigeria and Senegal.
