= Oxyrhachis nupta =

Scientific classification
- Kingdom: Animalia
- Phylum: Arthropoda
- Clade: Pancrustacea
- Class: Insecta
- Order: Hemiptera
- Suborder: Auchenorrhyncha
- Family: Membracidae
- Genus: Oxyrhachis
- Species: O. nupta

Binomial name
- Oxyrhachis nupta Capener, 1962

Species of insect

Oxyrhachis nupta is a species of treehoppers in the subfamily Centrotinae described by Alfred Lawrence Capener in 1962. It is found in Tanzania and Kenya.
