= Oxyrhachis maculipennis =

Scientific classification
- Kingdom: Animalia
- Phylum: Arthropoda
- Clade: Pancrustacea
- Class: Insecta
- Order: Hemiptera
- Suborder: Auchenorrhyncha
- Family: Membracidae
- Genus: Oxyrhachis
- Species: O. maculipennis

Binomial name
- Oxyrhachis maculipennis Funkhouser, 1939

Species of insect

Oxyrhachis maculipennis is a species of treehoppers in the subfamily Centrotinae described by William Delbert Funkhouser in 1939. It is found in Indonesia.
