= Metadelphax wetmorei =

Scientific classification
- Domain: Eukaryota
- Kingdom: Animalia
- Phylum: Arthropoda
- Class: Insecta
- Order: Hemiptera
- Suborder: Auchenorrhyncha
- Infraorder: Fulgoromorpha
- Family: Delphacidae
- Genus: Metadelphax
- Species: M. wetmorei

Binomial name
- Metadelphax wetmorei (Muir & Giffard, 1924)

Species of true bug

Metadelphax wetmorei is a species of delphacid planthopper in the family Delphacidae. It is found in Central America and North America.
