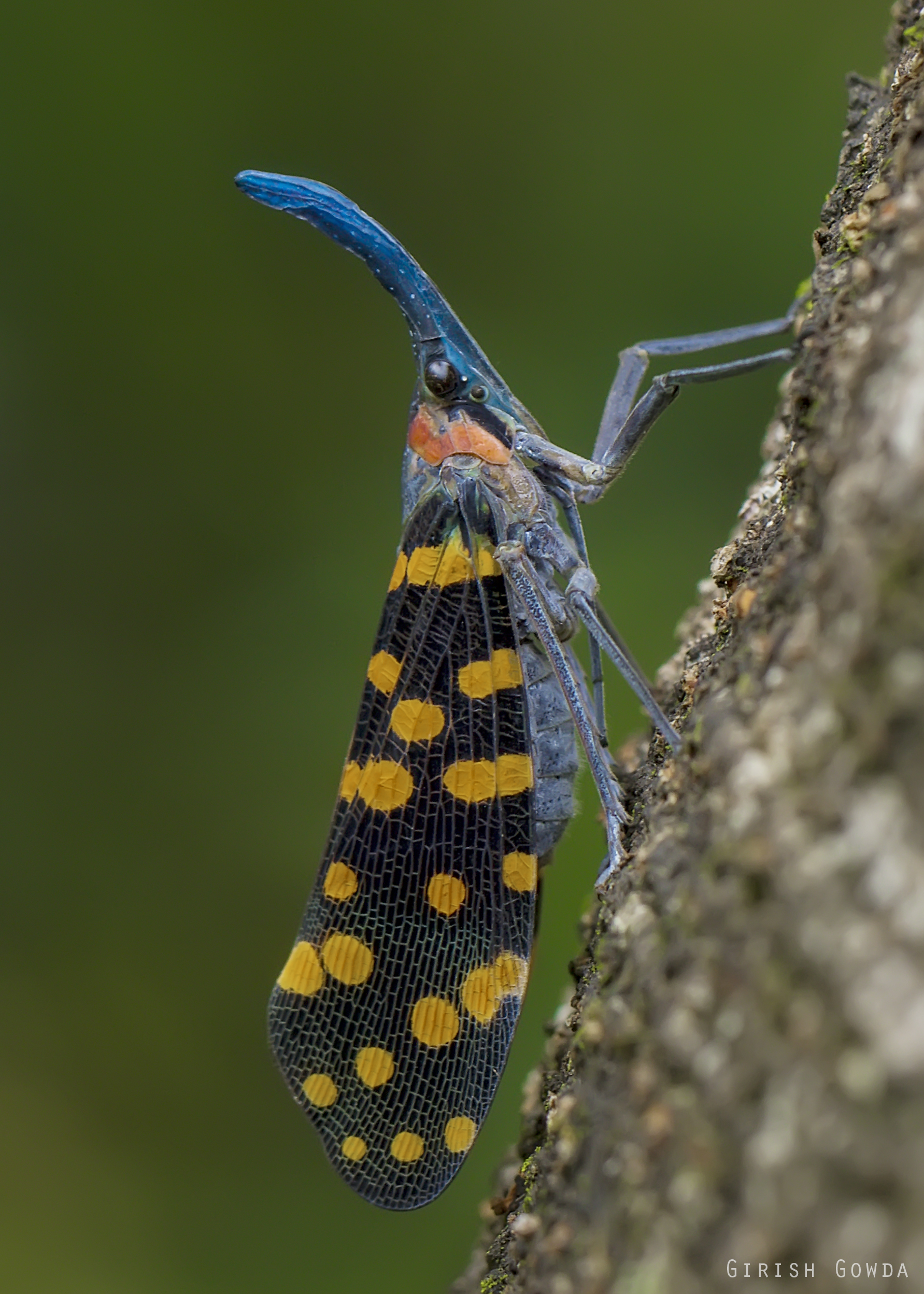

Scientific classification
- Domain: Eukaryota
- Kingdom: Animalia
- Phylum: Arthropoda
- Class: Insecta
- Order: Hemiptera
- Suborder: Auchenorrhyncha
- Infraorder: Fulgoromorpha
- Family: Fulgoridae
- Genus: Pyrops
- Species: P. delessertii

Binomial name
- Pyrops delessertii (Guérin-Méneville, 1840)

= Pyrops delessertii =

Species of insects

Pyrops delessertii is a species of true bug in the family Fulgoridae, in the genus Pyrops which are sometimes called "lanternflies". This species is endemic to peninsular India, mainly in the Western Ghats.

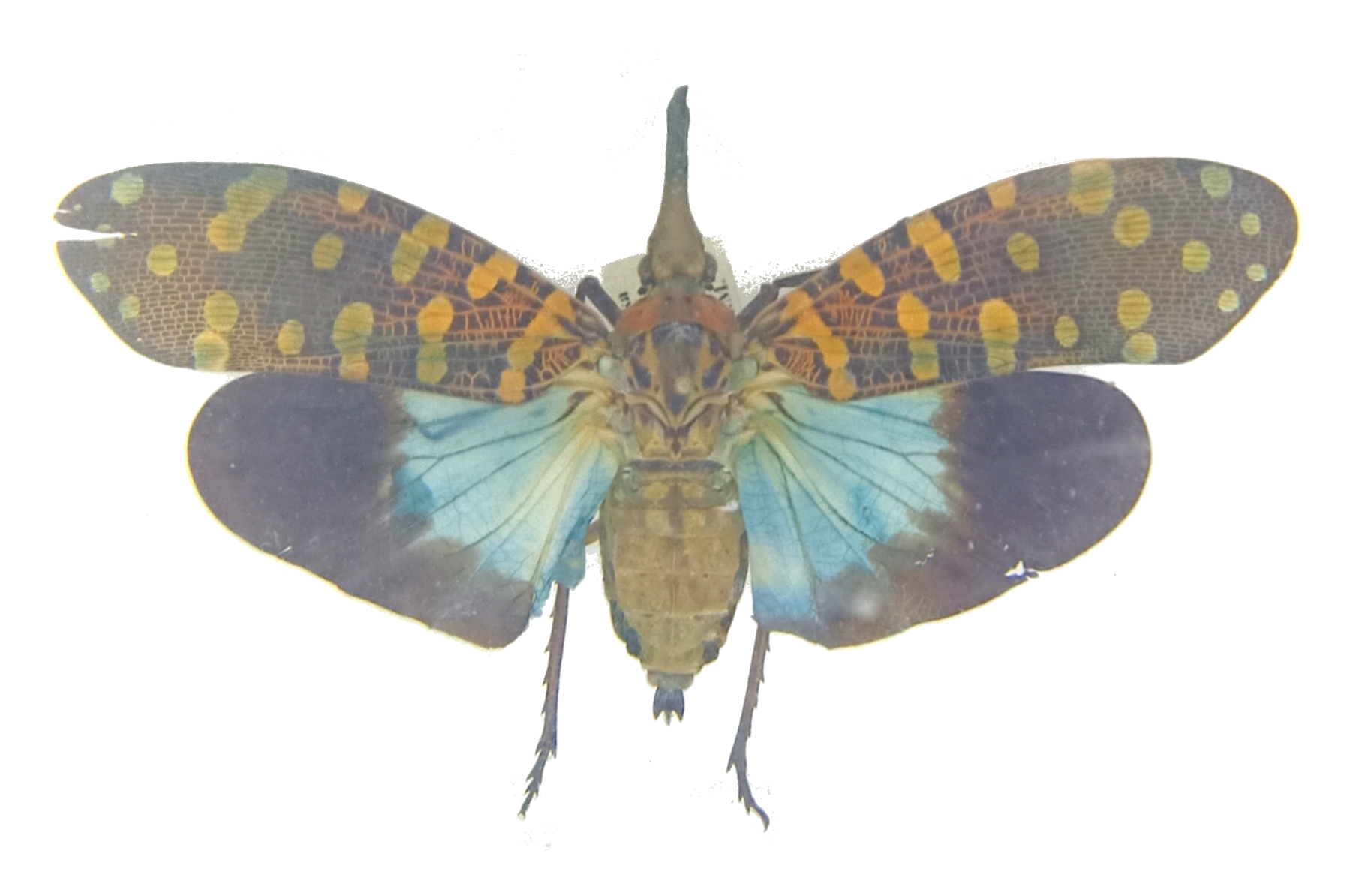
A specimen showing blue hindwing

== Description ==
The head, its snout, the mesothorax, abdomen, and legs are all blue. The snout has a few white spots and the prothorax is reddish. The base of the hindwing is also blue. The forewing, which is also called the tegmen (plural tegmina) is black with pale veins and yellow unbordered spots.

It differs significantly in pattern, colours and length of the "snout" from Pyrops maculatus and is sometimes treated as a subspecies of P. maculatus.

== Distribution ==
The species is found in the Western Ghats and the Nilgiris. Adolphe Delessert who discovered the species in the Nilgiris noted that it tended to be found along riverine forests and that it was hard to capture.
