= Oxyrhachis palus =

Scientific classification
- Kingdom: Animalia
- Phylum: Arthropoda
- Clade: Pancrustacea
- Class: Insecta
- Order: Hemiptera
- Suborder: Auchenorrhyncha
- Family: Membracidae
- Genus: Oxyrhachis
- Species: O. palus

Binomial name
- Oxyrhachis palus Buckton, 1905

Species of insect

Oxyrhachis palus is a species of treehoppers in the subfamily Centrotinae described by Buckton in 1905. It is found in India.
