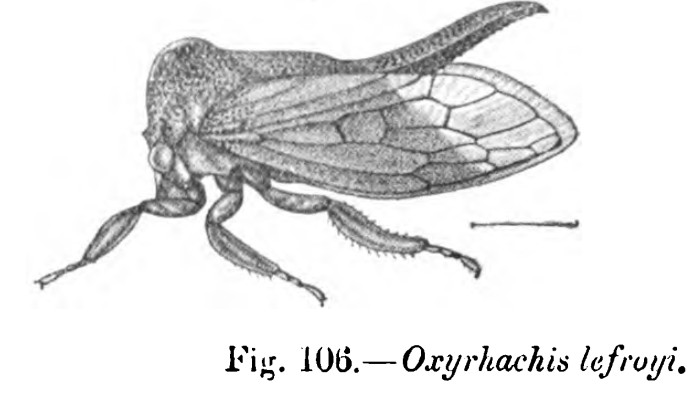

Scientific classification
- Kingdom: Animalia
- Phylum: Arthropoda
- Clade: Pancrustacea
- Class: Insecta
- Order: Hemiptera
- Suborder: Auchenorrhyncha
- Family: Membracidae
- Genus: Oxyrhachis
- Species: O. lefroyi

Binomial name
- Oxyrhachis lefroyi Distant, 1916

= Oxyrhachis lefroyi =

Species of insect

Oxyrhachis lefroyi is a species of treehoppers in the subfamily Centrotinae described by William Lucas Distant in 1916. It is found in India and Bangladesh.
