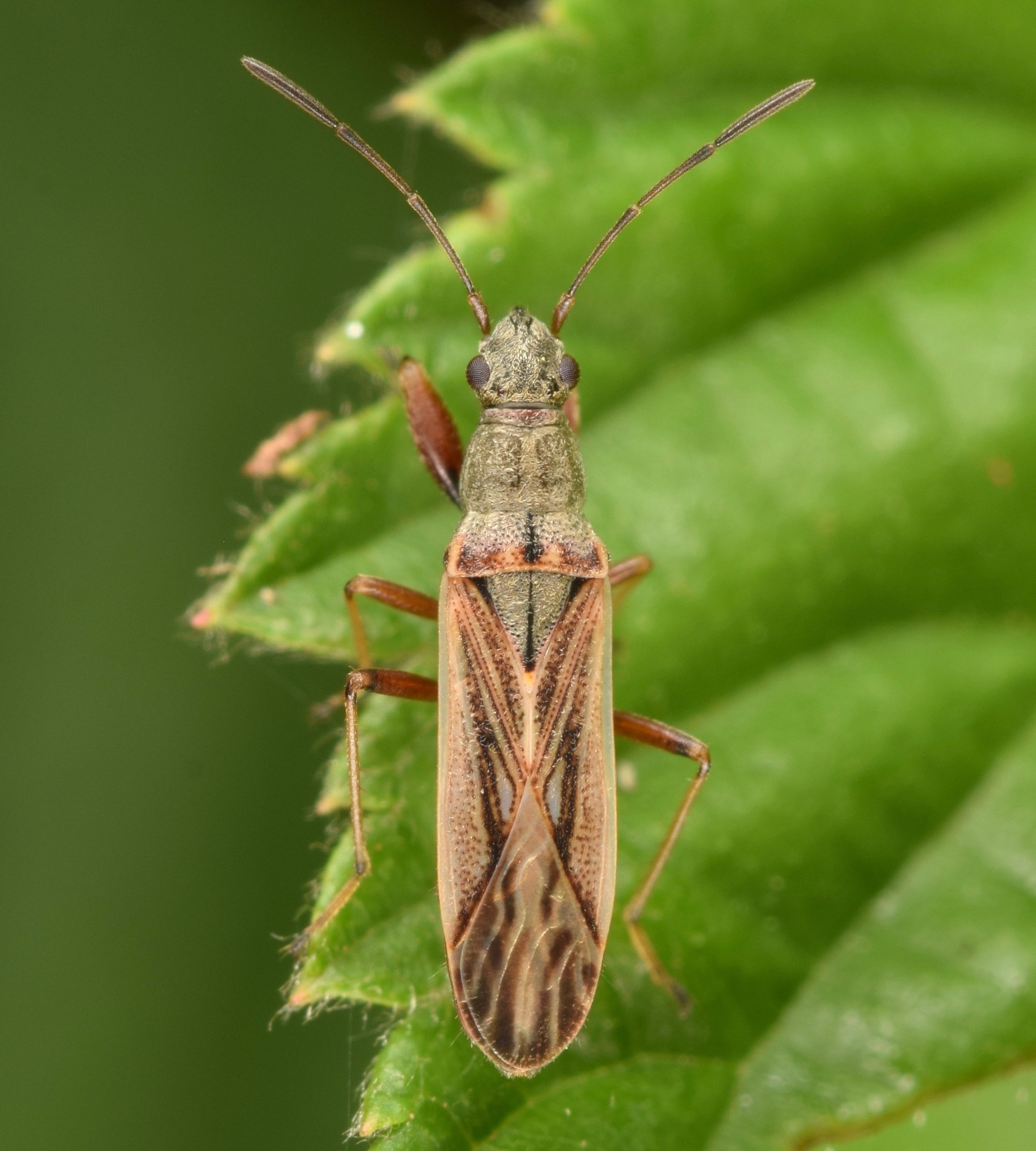

Scientific classification
- Domain: Eukaryota
- Kingdom: Animalia
- Phylum: Arthropoda
- Class: Insecta
- Order: Hemiptera
- Suborder: Heteroptera
- Family: Rhyparochromidae
- Tribe: Myodochini
- Genus: Paromius
- Species: P. longulus

Binomial name
- Paromius longulus (Dallas, 1852)

= Paromius longulus =

Species of true bug

Paromius longulus is a species of dirt-colored seed bug in the family Rhyparochromidae. It is found in the New World.
