= Oxyrhachis rufescens =

Scientific classification
- Kingdom: Animalia
- Phylum: Arthropoda
- Clade: Pancrustacea
- Class: Insecta
- Order: Hemiptera
- Suborder: Auchenorrhyncha
- Family: Membracidae
- Genus: Oxyrhachis
- Species: O. rufescens

Binomial name
- Oxyrhachis rufescens Walker, 1851

Synonyms
- Oxyrhachis rudis Walker, 1851

Species of insect

Oxyrhachis rufescens is a species of treehoppers in the subfamily Centrotinae described by Francis Walker in 1851. It is found in India.
