= Oxyrhachis capeneri =

Scientific classification
- Kingdom: Animalia
- Phylum: Arthropoda
- Clade: Pancrustacea
- Class: Insecta
- Order: Hemiptera
- Suborder: Auchenorrhyncha
- Family: Membracidae
- Genus: Oxyrhachis
- Species: O. capeneri

Binomial name
- Oxyrhachis capeneri Izzard, 1953

Synonyms
- Oxyrhachis delalandei Fieber, 1876; Oxyrrhachis capeneri Izzard, 1953

Species of insect

Oxyrhachis capeneri is a species of treehoppers in the subfamily Centrotinae described by Reginald John Izzard in 1953. It is found in many countries around the Mediterranean Sea including Egypt, Tunisia, and Italy.
