= Oxyrhachis haldari =

Scientific classification
- Kingdom: Animalia
- Phylum: Arthropoda
- Clade: Pancrustacea
- Class: Insecta
- Order: Hemiptera
- Suborder: Auchenorrhyncha
- Family: Membracidae
- Genus: Oxyrhachis
- Species: O. haldari

Binomial name
- Oxyrhachis haldari Ananthasubramanian, 1980

Species of insect

Oxyrhachis haldari is a species of treehoppers in the subfamily Centrotinae described by K.L. Ananthasubramanian in 1980. It is found in India.
