= Oxyrhachis brincki =

Scientific classification
- Kingdom: Animalia
- Phylum: Arthropoda
- Clade: Pancrustacea
- Class: Insecta
- Order: Hemiptera
- Suborder: Auchenorrhyncha
- Family: Membracidae
- Genus: Oxyrhachis
- Species: O. brincki

Binomial name
- Oxyrhachis brincki Capener, 1960

Species of insect

Oxyrhachis brincki is a species of treehoppers in the subfamily Centrotinae described by Alfred Lawrence Capener in 1960. It is found in South Africa.
