= Oxyrhachis biformis =

Scientific classification
- Kingdom: Animalia
- Phylum: Arthropoda
- Clade: Pancrustacea
- Class: Insecta
- Order: Hemiptera
- Suborder: Auchenorrhyncha
- Family: Membracidae
- Genus: Oxyrhachis
- Species: O. biformis

Binomial name
- Oxyrhachis biformis Capener, 1951

Species of insect

Oxyrhachis biformis is a species of treehoppers in the subfamily Centrotinae described by Alfred Lawrence Capener in 1951. It is found in South Africa.
