= Oxyrhachis sulcicornis =

Scientific classification
- Kingdom: Animalia
- Phylum: Arthropoda
- Clade: Pancrustacea
- Class: Insecta
- Order: Hemiptera
- Suborder: Auchenorrhyncha
- Family: Membracidae
- Genus: Oxyrhachis
- Species: O. sulcicornis

Binomial name
- Oxyrhachis sulcicornis Thunberg, 1822

Species of insect

Oxyrhachis sulcicornis is a species of treehoppers in the subfamily Centrotinae described by Carl Peter Thunberg in 1822. It is found in Southern Africa.
