= Oxyrhachis longicornis =

Scientific classification
- Kingdom: Animalia
- Phylum: Arthropoda
- Clade: Pancrustacea
- Class: Insecta
- Order: Hemiptera
- Suborder: Auchenorrhyncha
- Family: Membracidae
- Genus: Oxyrhachis
- Species: O. longicornis

Binomial name
- Oxyrhachis longicornis Distant, 1908

Species of insect

Oxyrhachis longicornis is a species of treehoppers in the subfamily Centrotinae described by William Lucas Distant in 1908. It is found in Zimbabwe.
