= Oxyrhachis delalandei =

Scientific classification
- Kingdom: Animalia
- Phylum: Arthropoda
- Clade: Pancrustacea
- Class: Insecta
- Order: Hemiptera
- Suborder: Auchenorrhyncha
- Family: Membracidae
- Genus: Oxyrhachis
- Species: O. delalandei

Binomial name
- Oxyrhachis delalandei Fairmaire, 1846

Synonyms
- Gongroneura confusa Distant, 1916; Oxyrhachis Delalandei [sic] Fairmaire, 1846; Oxyrhachis delalandii [sic] Fairmaire, 1846; Oxyrhachis delalandi [sic] Fairmaire, 1846; Gangroneura [sic] delandei [sic] (Fairmaire, 1846); Pedalion fasciata Buckton, 1903; Gongroneura pictipennis [sic] (Buckton, 1903); Pedalion punctipennis Buckton, 1903

Species of insect

Oxyrhachis delalandei is a species of treehoppers in the subfamily Centrotinae described by Léon Fairmaire in 1846. It is found in Africa and the Middle East.
