= Oxyrhachis ampliata =

Scientific classification
- Kingdom: Animalia
- Phylum: Arthropoda
- Clade: Pancrustacea
- Class: Insecta
- Order: Hemiptera
- Suborder: Auchenorrhyncha
- Family: Membracidae
- Genus: Oxyrhachis
- Species: O. ampliata

Binomial name
- Oxyrhachis ampliata Liang & McKamey, 1996

Synonyms
- Oxyrhachis grandis Ananthasubramanian, 1980

Species of insect

Oxyrhachis ampliata is a species of treehoppers in the subfamily Centrotinae described by Liang & McKamey in 1996. It is found in India.

== Description ==
Individuals in this species are typically 6.5mm in length and are approximately 3.5 times as long as they are wide. Their coloring is primarily a mixture of reddish-brown and black, with a glossy black pronotum, white hairs on the body, and reddish-brown veins in the wings. These observations were made off of a single male specimen and may not represent population averages or female individuals of this species.
