= Oxyrhachis lagosensis =

Scientific classification
- Kingdom: Animalia
- Phylum: Arthropoda
- Clade: Pancrustacea
- Class: Insecta
- Order: Hemiptera
- Suborder: Auchenorrhyncha
- Family: Membracidae
- Genus: Oxyrhachis
- Species: O. lagosensis

Binomial name
- Oxyrhachis lagosensis Distant, 1914

Species of insect

Oxyrhachis lagosensis is a species of treehoppers in the subfamily Centrotinae described by William Lucas Distant in 1914. It is found in India and West Africa.
