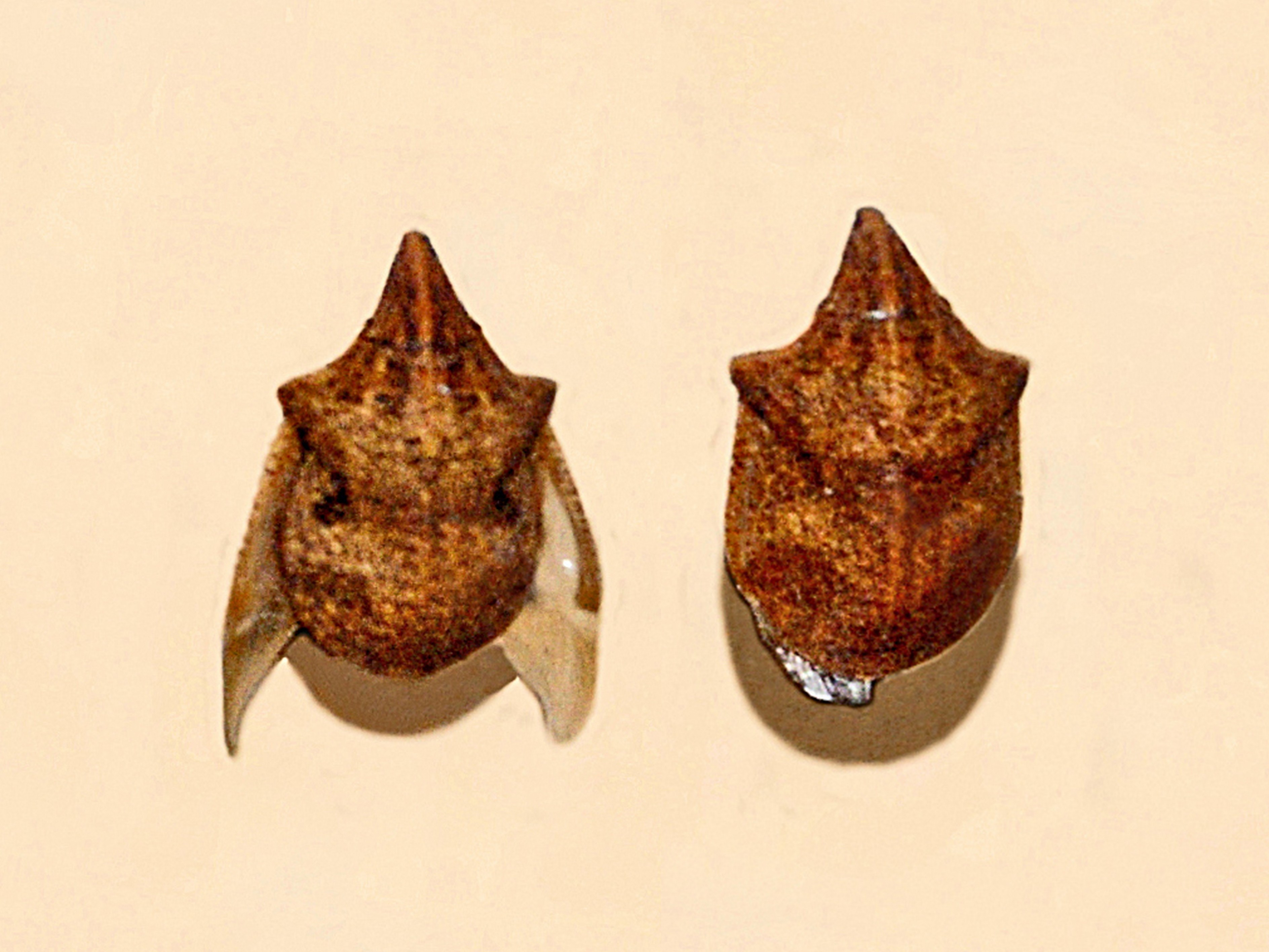
- Hotea curculionoides

Scientific classification
- Kingdom: Animalia
- Phylum: Arthropoda
- Class: Insecta
- Order: Hemiptera
- Suborder: Heteroptera
- Family: Scutelleridae
- Genus: Hotea; Amyot & Serville, 1843

= Hotea =

Genus of true bugs

Hotea is a genus of African and Asian shield-backed bugs belonging to the family Scutelleridae.

== Species ==
- Hotea acuta Stål, 1865
- Hotea circumcincta Walker, 1867
- Hotea curculionoides (Herrich-Schäffer, 1836)
- Hotea denticulata Stål, 1865
- Hotea gambiae (Westwood, 1837)
- Hotea nigrorufa Walker, 1867
- Hotea redtenbacheri
- Hotea subfasciata (Westwood, 1837

== Description ==
Male jewel bugs of the genus Hotea possess an unusually large, spiky, and heavily sclerotized genitalia. They are used in a mating practice known as traumatic insemination, a result of evolutionary sexual conflict. Male Hotea bugs tear through the female reproductive ducts to deposit sperm, inflicting substantial damage to the female in the process.
