= Oxyrhachis apicalis =

Scientific classification
- Kingdom: Animalia
- Phylum: Arthropoda
- Clade: Pancrustacea
- Class: Insecta
- Order: Hemiptera
- Suborder: Auchenorrhyncha
- Family: Membracidae
- Genus: Oxyrhachis
- Species: O. apicalis

Binomial name
- Oxyrhachis apicalis Ananthasubramanian, 1980

Species of insect

Oxyrhachis apicalis is a species of treehoppers in the subfamily Centrotinae described by K.S. Ananthasubramanian in 1980. It is found in eastern India.
