= Oxyrhachis carinata =

Scientific classification
- Kingdom: Animalia
- Phylum: Arthropoda
- Clade: Pancrustacea
- Class: Insecta
- Order: Hemiptera
- Suborder: Auchenorrhyncha
- Family: Membracidae
- Genus: Oxyrhachis
- Species: O. carinata

Binomial name
- Oxyrhachis carinata Funkhouser, 1927

Species of insect

Oxyrhachis carinata is a species of treehoppers in the subfamily Centrotinae described by William Delbert Funkhouser in 1927. It is found in South Africa, Zimbabwe, and Tanzania.
