= Oxyrhachis versicolor =

Scientific classification
- Kingdom: Animalia
- Phylum: Arthropoda
- Clade: Pancrustacea
- Class: Insecta
- Order: Hemiptera
- Suborder: Auchenorrhyncha
- Family: Membracidae
- Genus: Oxyrhachis
- Species: O. versicolor

Binomial name
- Oxyrhachis versicolor Distant, 1915

Species of insect

Oxyrhachis versicolor is a species of treehoppers in the subfamily Centrotinae described by William Lucas Distant in 1915. It is found in Israel, Palestine, and Yemen and has an asserted distribution throughout the Middle East and North Africa.
