= Oxyrhachis brevicornis =

Scientific classification
- Kingdom: Animalia
- Phylum: Arthropoda
- Clade: Pancrustacea
- Class: Insecta
- Order: Hemiptera
- Suborder: Auchenorrhyncha
- Family: Membracidae
- Genus: Oxyrhachis
- Species: O. brevicornis

Binomial name
- Oxyrhachis brevicornis Jacobi, 1910

Species of insect

Oxyrhachis brevicornis is a species of treehoppers in the subfamily Centrotinae described by Arnold Jacobi in 1910. It is found in Tanzania.
