= Oxyrhachis fuscicornis =

Scientific classification
- Kingdom: Animalia
- Phylum: Arthropoda
- Clade: Pancrustacea
- Class: Insecta
- Order: Hemiptera
- Suborder: Auchenorrhyncha
- Family: Membracidae
- Genus: Oxyrhachis
- Species: O. fuscicornis

Binomial name
- Oxyrhachis fuscicornis Germar, 1835

Species of insect

Oxyrhachis fuscicornis is a species of treehoppers in the subfamily Centrotinae described by Ernst Friedrich Germar in 1835. It is found widely throughout Africa and South Asia.
