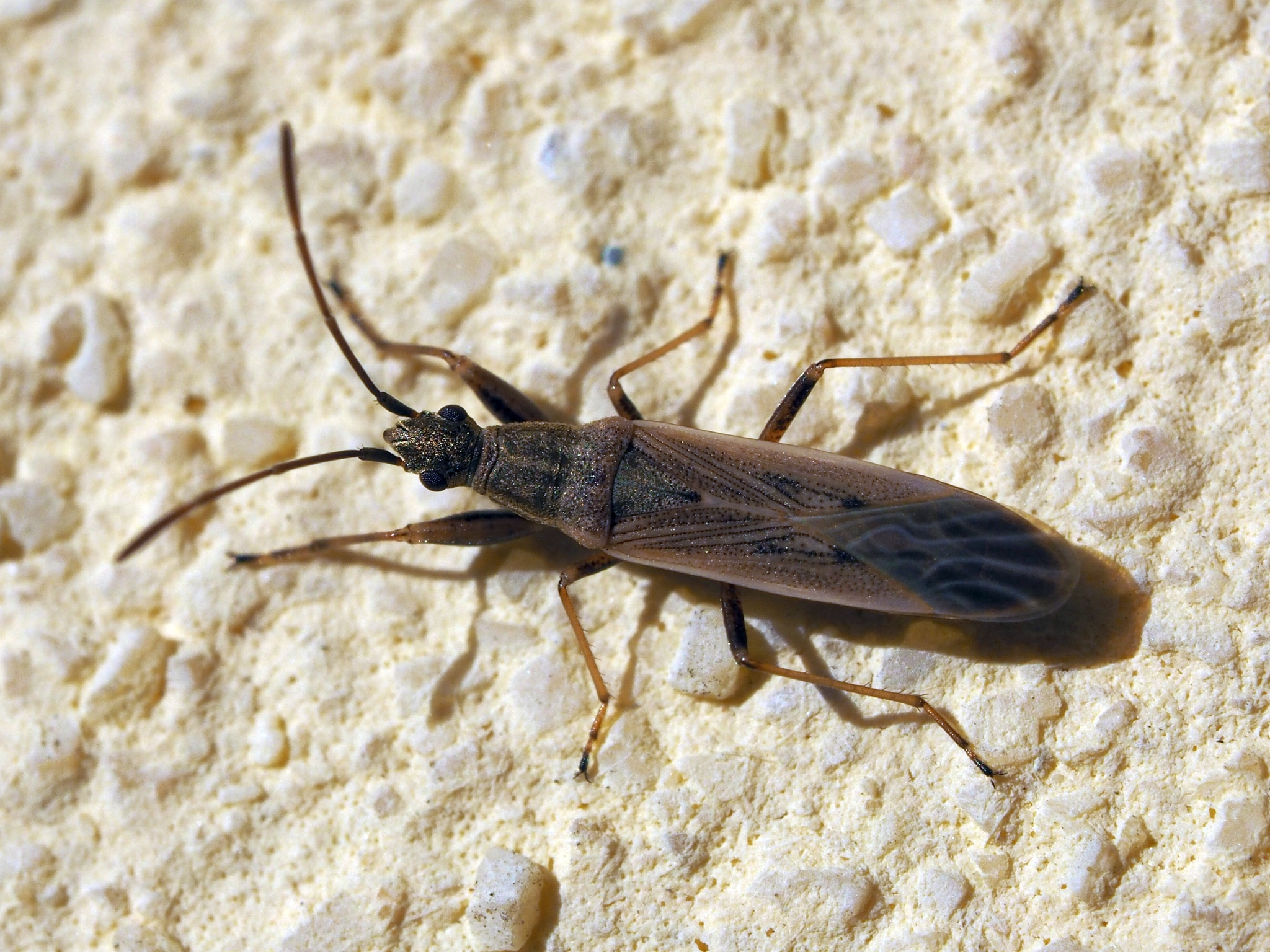
- In Italy

Scientific classification
- Kingdom: Animalia
- Phylum: Arthropoda
- Clade: Pancrustacea
- Class: Insecta
- Order: Hemiptera
- Suborder: Heteroptera
- Family: Rhyparochromidae
- Subfamily: Rhyparochrominae
- Tribe: Myodochini
- Genus: Paromius
- Species: P. gracilis

Binomial name
- Paromius gracilis (Rambur, 1839)

= Paromius gracilis =

Species of dirt-colored seed bug

Paromius gracilis is a species of dirt-colored seed bug in the family Rhyparochromidae found mainly in the Palearctic.
