= Oxyrhachis uncata =

Scientific classification
- Kingdom: Animalia
- Phylum: Arthropoda
- Clade: Pancrustacea
- Class: Insecta
- Order: Hemiptera
- Suborder: Auchenorrhyncha
- Family: Membracidae
- Genus: Oxyrhachis
- Species: O. uncata

Binomial name
- Oxyrhachis uncata Melichar, 1903

Synonyms
- Centrotus nectaris Buckton, 1903

Species of insect

Oxyrhachis uncata is a species of treehoppers in the subfamily Centrotinae described by Leopold Melichar in 1903. It is found in southern India.
