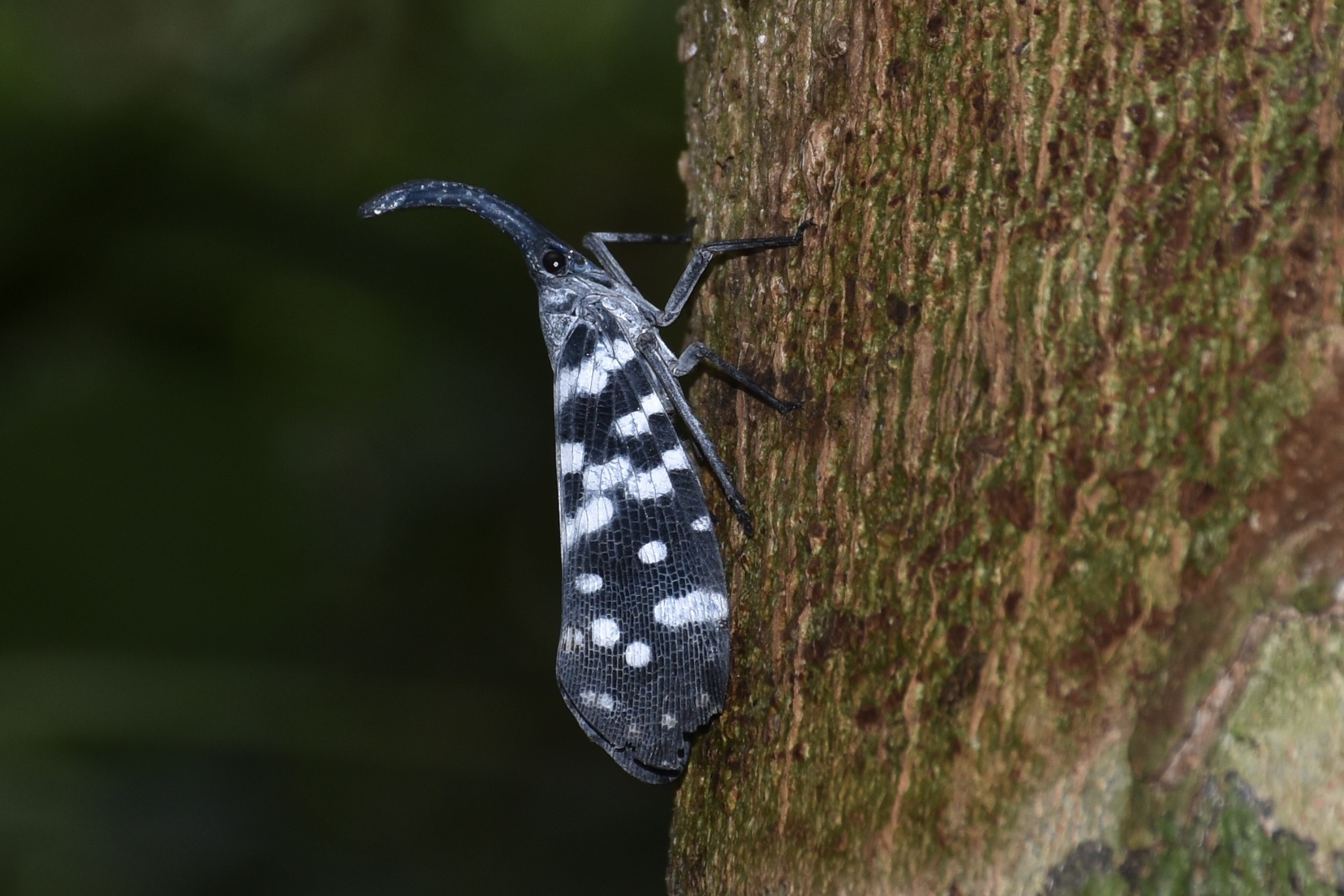
- Pyrops maculatus in Sinharaja Forest Reserve, Sri Lanka

Scientific classification
- Kingdom: Animalia
- Phylum: Arthropoda
- Class: Insecta
- Order: Hemiptera
- Suborder: Auchenorrhyncha
- Infraorder: Fulgoromorpha
- Family: Fulgoridae
- Genus: Pyrops
- Species: P. maculatus

Binomial name
- Pyrops maculatus (Olivier, 1791)

Synonyms
- Fulgora macularia Olivier, 1791; Fulgora maculata Olivier, 1791; Gulgora maculata Olivier, 1791

= Pyrops maculatus =

Species of true bug

Pyrops maculatus is a species of planthopper belonging to the family Fulgoridae. A population is found in Sri Lanka while another is known from southwestern India.

== Subspecies ==
Subspecies are:

- Pyrops maculatus delessertii (Guérin-Méneville, 1840) – found in the Western Ghats of India, treated as Pyrops delessertii by some
- Pyrops maculatus fulvirostris (Walker, 1858) - Sri Lanka
- Pyrops maculatus maculatus (Olivier, 1791)

== Distribution ==
This species is present in Sri Lanka and southern India.

== Description ==
Pyrops maculatus can reach a length of 30–40 mm (1.2–1.6 in). This species shows large white spots on tegmina and a broad brown area along all sutural margin.
