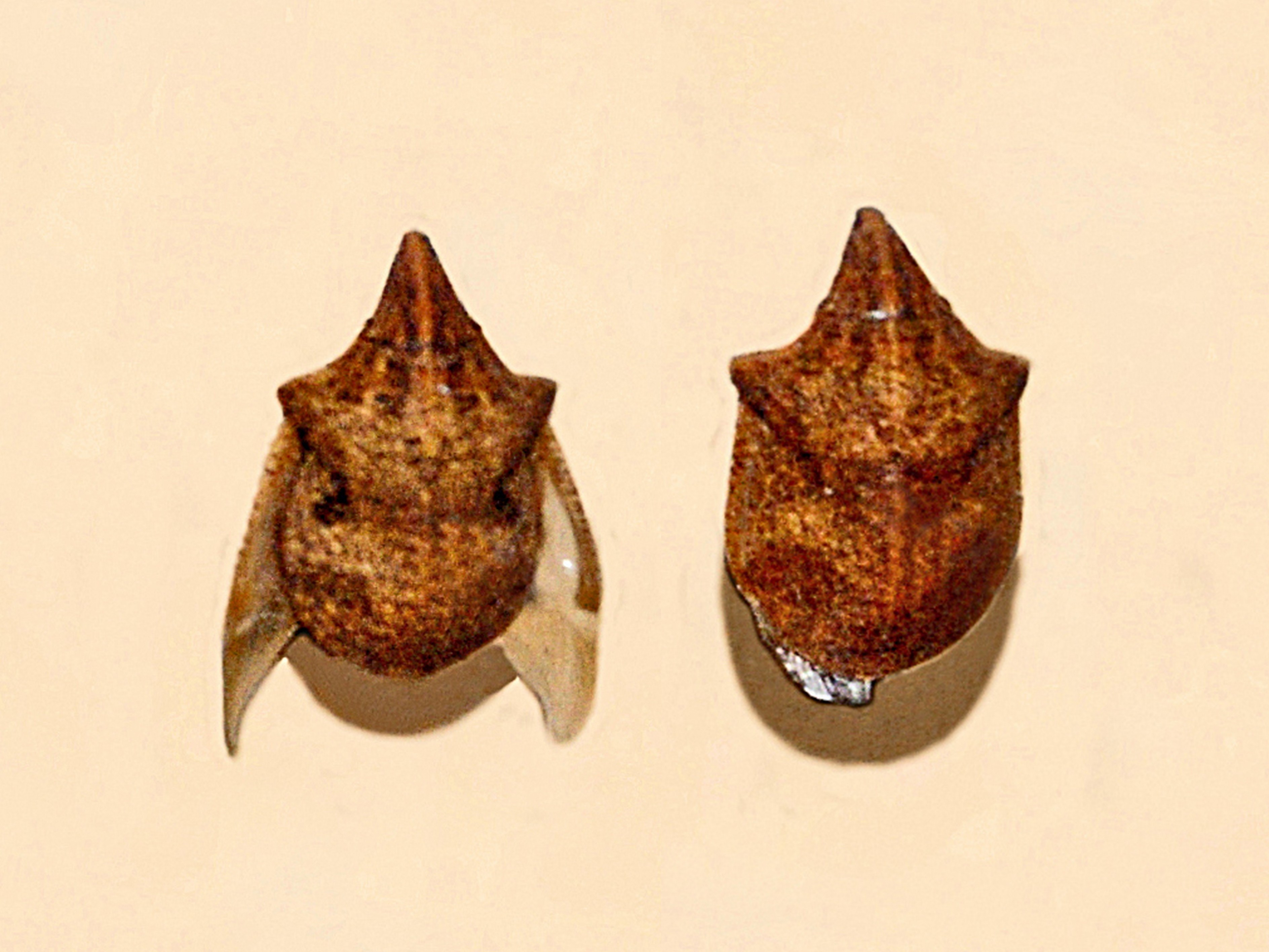
- Hotea curculionoides from Myanmar

Scientific classification
- Kingdom: Animalia
- Phylum: Arthropoda
- Class: Insecta
- Order: Hemiptera
- Suborder: Heteroptera
- Family: Scutelleridae
- Genus: Hotea
- Species: H. curculionoides

Binomial name
- Hotea curculionoides (Herrich-Schäffer, 1836)

Synonyms
- Hotea fusca Vollenhoven, 1863; Hotea nasuta Walker, 1867; Pachycoris curculionoides Herrich-Schäffer, 1836; Pachycoris punctulatus Germar, 1839

= Hotea curculionoides =

Species of true bug

Hotea curculionoides is a species of shield-backed bugs belonging to the family Scutelleridae.

== Subspecies ==
- Hotea curculionoides curculionoides (Herrich-Schäffer, 1836)
- Hotea curculionoides occidentalis Hoberlandt, 1997

== Distribution ==
This species is present in India and Southeastern Asia.
