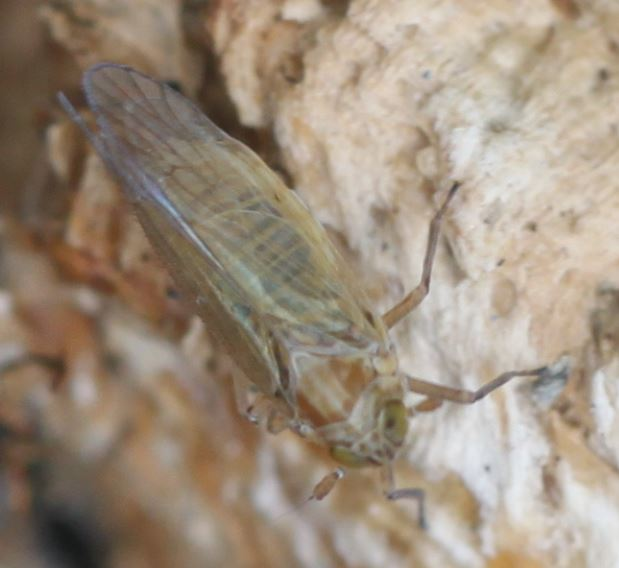

Scientific classification
- Domain: Eukaryota
- Kingdom: Animalia
- Phylum: Arthropoda
- Class: Insecta
- Order: Hemiptera
- Suborder: Auchenorrhyncha
- Infraorder: Fulgoromorpha
- Family: Delphacidae
- Genus: Metadelphax
- Species: M. propinqua

Binomial name
- Metadelphax propinqua (Fieber, 1866)

Synonyms
- Delphacodes neopropinqua Muir, 1917; Delphacodes subfusca Muir, 1919

= Metadelphax propinqua =

Species of true bug

Metadelphax propinqua is a species of delphacid planthoppers in the family Delphacidae. It is found in Africa, Australia, the Caribbean, Europe, Northern Asia (excluding China), Central America, North America, Oceania, South America, and Southern Asia. It is an introduced species in the Nearctic and Neotropic.
