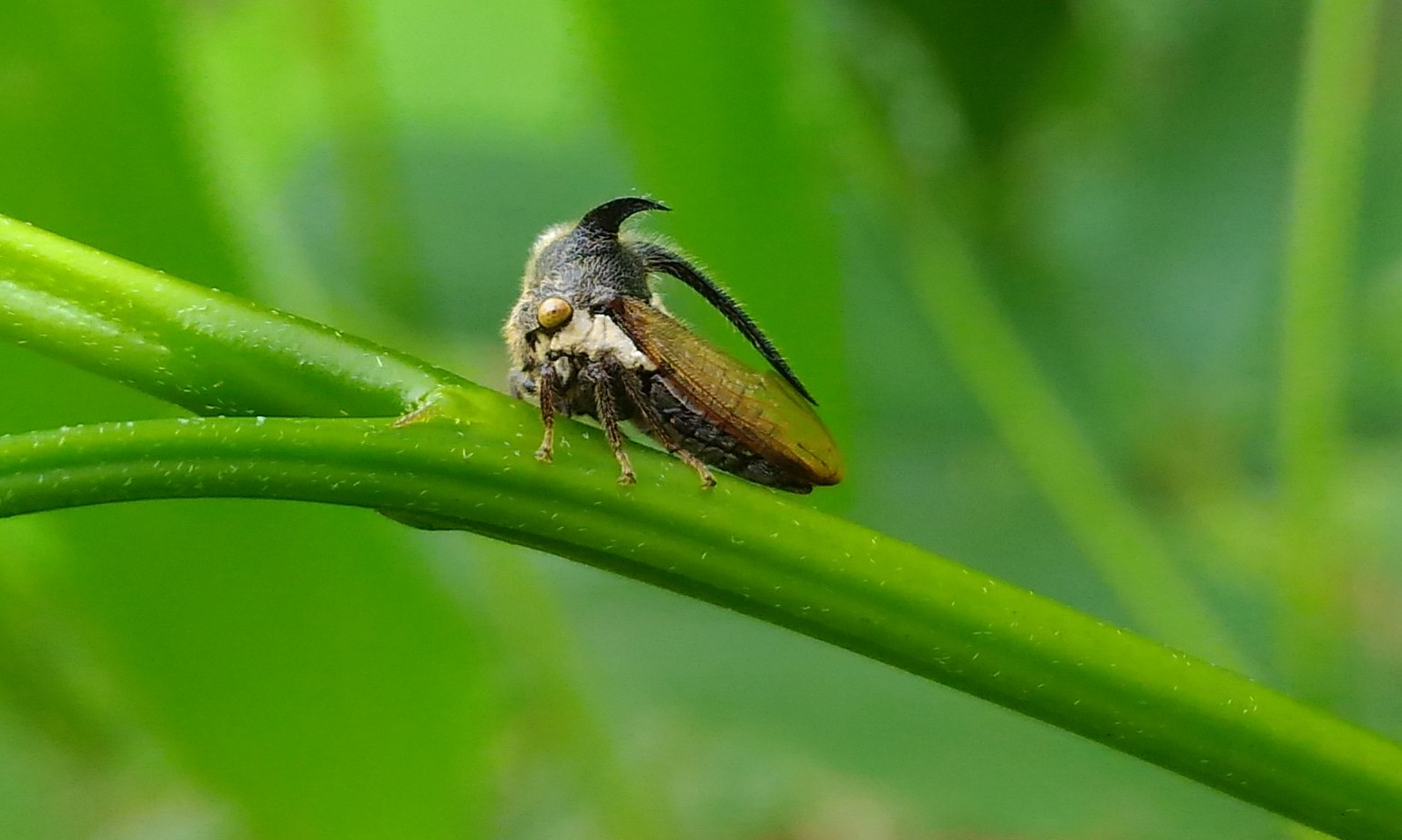

Scientific classification
- Kingdom: Animalia
- Phylum: Arthropoda
- Clade: Pancrustacea
- Class: Insecta
- Order: Hemiptera
- Suborder: Auchenorrhyncha
- Family: Membracidae
- Genus: Oxyrhachis
- Species: O. taranda

Binomial name
- Oxyrhachis taranda Fabricius, 1798

= Oxyrhachis taranda =

Species of insect

Oxyrhachis taranda is a species of treehoppers in the subfamily Centrotinae described by Johan Christian Fabricius in 1798. It is found in Africa and South Asia.
