= Oxyrhachis inermis =

Scientific classification
- Kingdom: Animalia
- Phylum: Arthropoda
- Clade: Pancrustacea
- Class: Insecta
- Order: Hemiptera
- Suborder: Auchenorrhyncha
- Family: Membracidae
- Genus: Oxyrhachis
- Species: O. inermis

Binomial name
- Oxyrhachis inermis Stål, 1870

Species of insect

Oxyrhachis inermis is a species of treehoppers in the subfamily Centrotinae described by Carl Stål in 1870. It is found in Sri Lanka.
