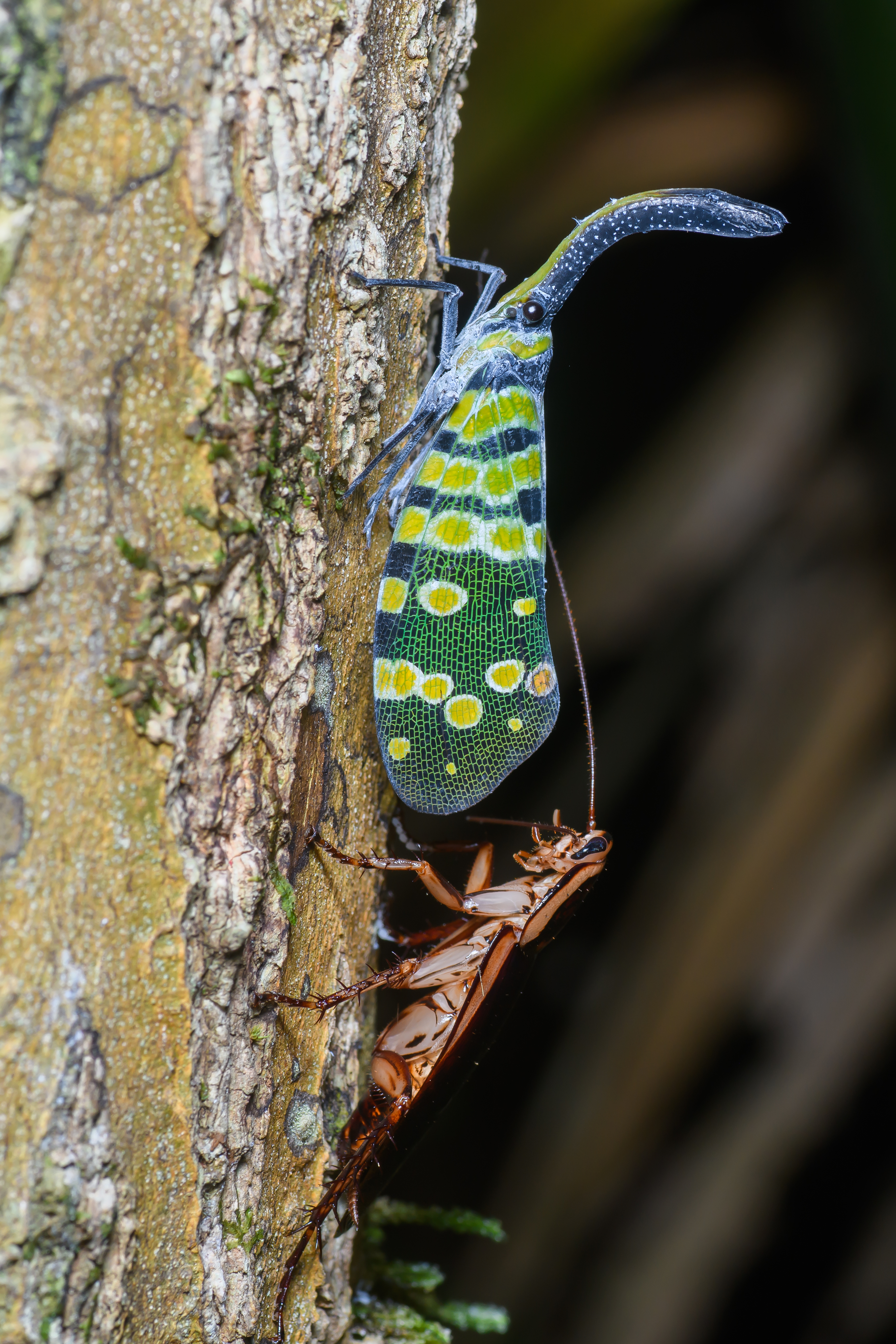
- Pyrops connectens being attended to by a cockroach

Scientific classification
- Kingdom: Animalia
- Phylum: Arthropoda
- Clade: Pancrustacea
- Class: Insecta
- Order: Hemiptera
- Suborder: Auchenorrhyncha
- Infraorder: Fulgoromorpha
- Family: Fulgoridae
- Genus: Pyrops
- Species: P. connectens

Binomial name
- Pyrops connectens (Atkinson, 1885)

= Pyrops connectens =

Species of lanternflies

Pyrops connectens is a species of planthoppers from the Fulgoridae family.

== Identification ==
The species is most similar to Pyrops spinolae in colour, but the shape of the cephalic process and the pattern and the size of the spots on the tegmen. The size of the spots on the tegmina will also distinguish it from series with same or similar shape of cephalic process, like Pyrops coelestinus. The base of the hindwing are white or pale blue with 4-5 concolorous spots outside of the patch.

== Distribution ==
It is found in Myanmar and Thailand.

== Etymology ==
The species epithet connectens relates to connecting or linking.
