= P. viridirostris =

P. viridirostris may refer to:

- Pyrops viridirostris, a species of Lanternfly in the genus Pyrops, found in NE India and Southeast Asia
- Phaenicophaeus viridirostris, the blue faced malkoha, a species of non brood-parasitic cuckoo from South India and Sri Lanka
