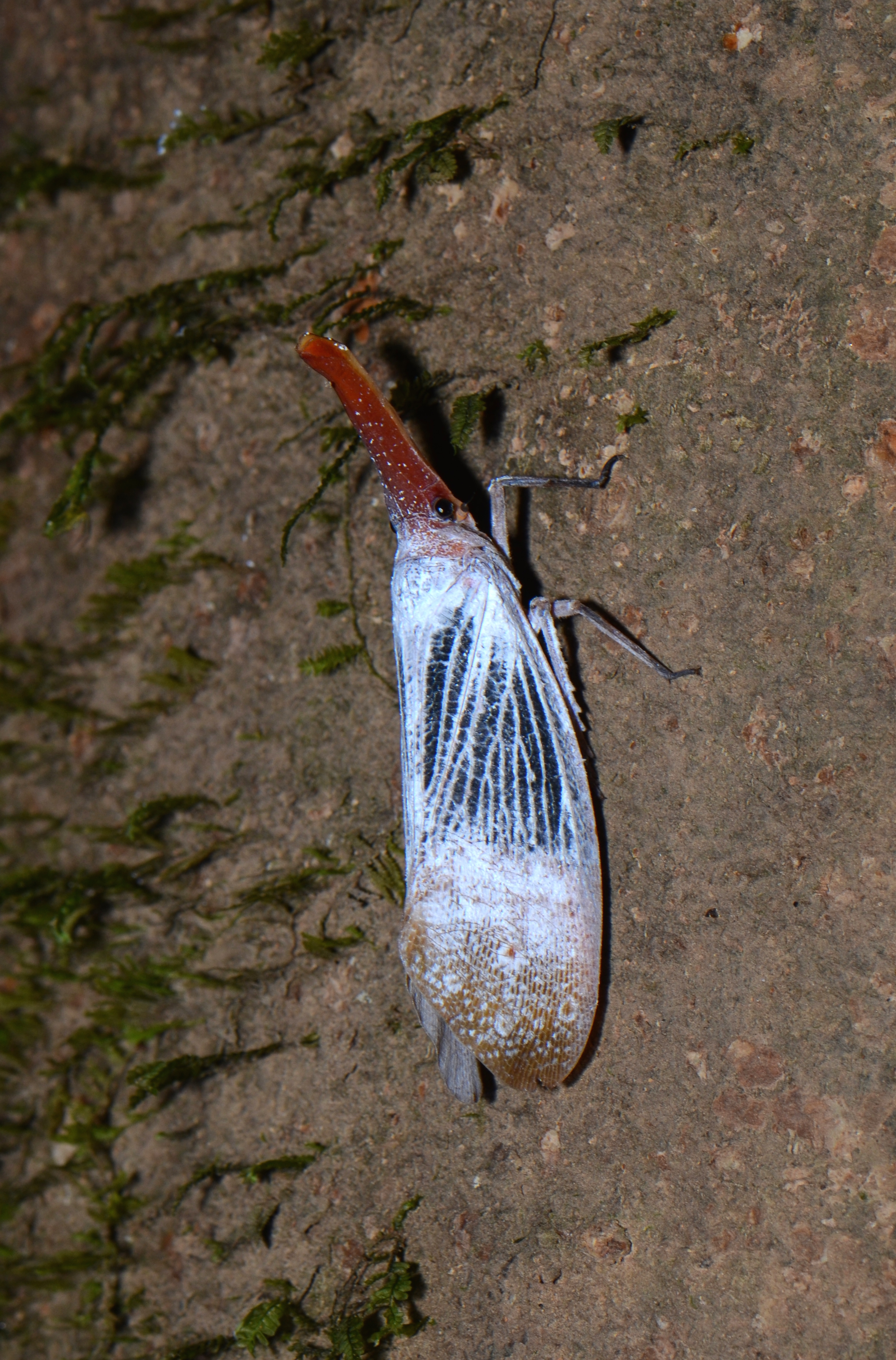
- Pyrops sultana near Mulu, in Sarawak, Malaysian Borneo

Scientific classification
- Kingdom: Animalia
- Phylum: Arthropoda
- Class: Insecta
- Order: Hemiptera
- Suborder: Auchenorrhyncha
- Infraorder: Fulgoromorpha
- Family: Fulgoridae
- Genus: Pyrops
- Species: P. sultana

Binomial name
- Pyrops sultana (Adams, 1847)

Synonyms
- Fulgora gigantea Butler, 1874; Fulgora basinigra Schmidt, 1905

= Pyrops sultana =

Species of plant hoppers

Pyrops sultana is a species of lanternfly found on the island of Borneo.

== Identification ==
The head projection, which is also known as a cephalic process, is red, and yellow or peach below. This, along with the mostly white tegmen, will distinguish this species from all other Pyrops except Pyrops erectus, which has the cephalic process strongly recurved upwards in the apical half. That species is found in Java, so their ranges do not overlap.

== Variability ==
This species can have the basal 2/3rds of each tegmen white, or black with white veins. This form with the black basal 2/3rds was previously considered a separate species.
