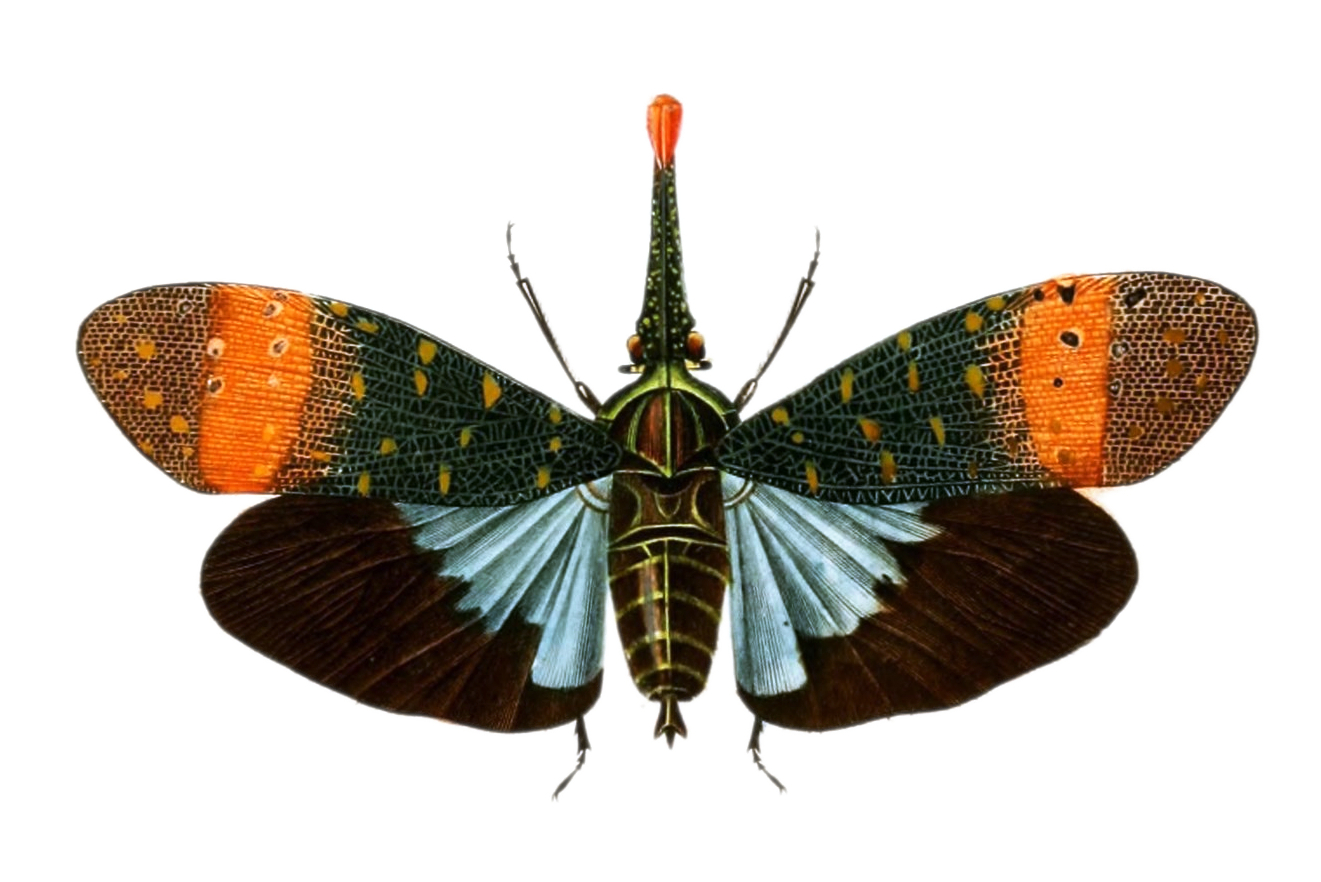

Scientific classification
- Kingdom: Animalia
- Phylum: Arthropoda
- Clade: Pancrustacea
- Class: Insecta
- Order: Hemiptera
- Suborder: Auchenorrhyncha
- Infraorder: Fulgoromorpha
- Family: Fulgoridae
- Genus: Pyrops
- Species: P. pyrorhynchus

Binomial name
- Pyrops pyrorhynchus (Donovan, 1800)

= Pyrops pyrorhynchus =

Species of insect

Pyrops pyrorhynchus is a species of lanternfly of the family Fulgoridae. It is found in India, Thailand, and Malaysia.

== Identification ==
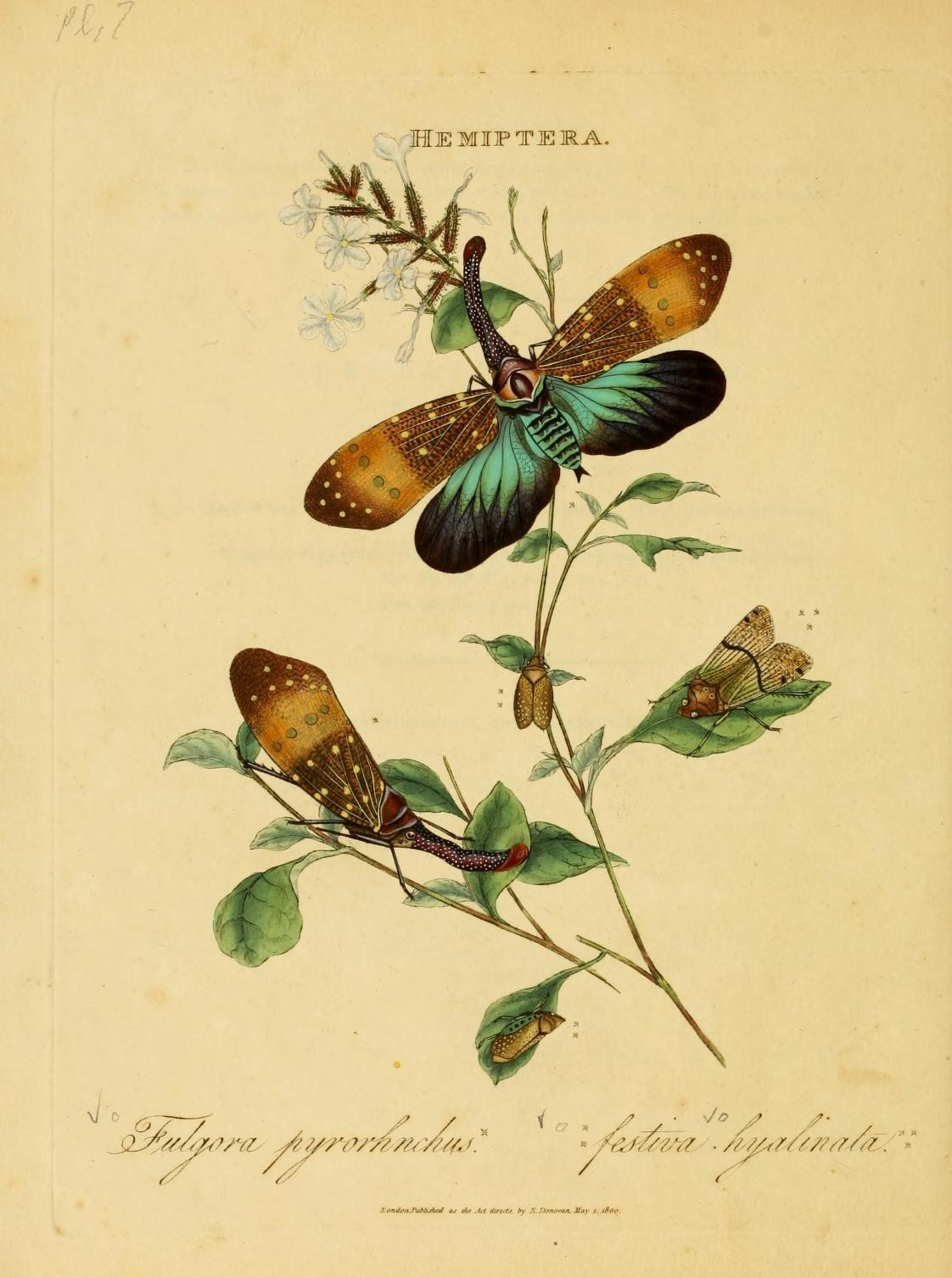
Pyrops pyrorhynchus (The 2 large insects) in Donovan (1800)

The overall colour is brown, the tip of the head extension, which is also known as a cephalic process, is red. The basal 2/3rds of the forewings, also known as the tegmen in Fulgoridae, can be brown to green. It can be distinguished from all similar species except Pyrops pythicus by the colour, and from it by the presence of outlined circles, not unmargined spots, at 2/3rds of the tegmen. Also, P. pythicus is in Indonesia, but P. pyrorhynchus is found on mainland S and SE Asia.

== Etymology ==
From Greek – πυρ (fire/flame) and ῥύγχος (snout)
