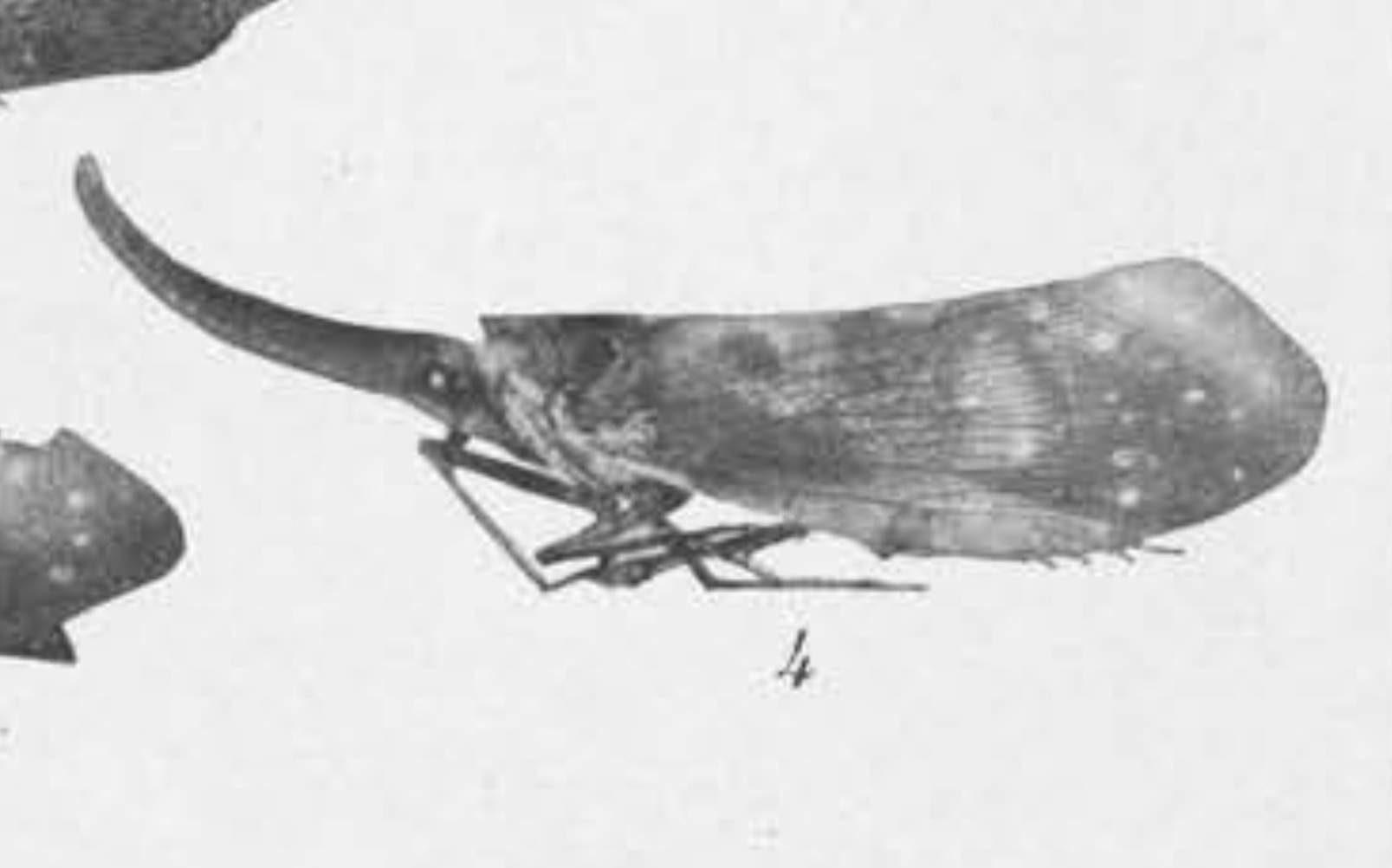

Scientific classification
- Kingdom: Animalia
- Phylum: Arthropoda
- Clade: Pancrustacea
- Class: Insecta
- Order: Hemiptera
- Suborder: Auchenorrhyncha
- Infraorder: Fulgoromorpha
- Family: Fulgoridae
- Genus: Pyrops
- Species: P. fumosus

Binomial name
- Pyrops fumosus (Baker, 1925)

Synonyms
- Fulgora fumosa (basionym)

= Pyrops fumosus =

Species of lanternflies

Pyrops fumosus is a species of Pyrops in the lanternfly family found on Samar island.

== Description ==
It is the one out of the 14 Philippine Pyrops, but yet it is the only one to sport a tegmen that is green, the spots solid and not hollow, and the basal spots not elongate, but round. The tegmen tips are brown, contrasting with the main pale green colour, unlike any other Pyrops.
