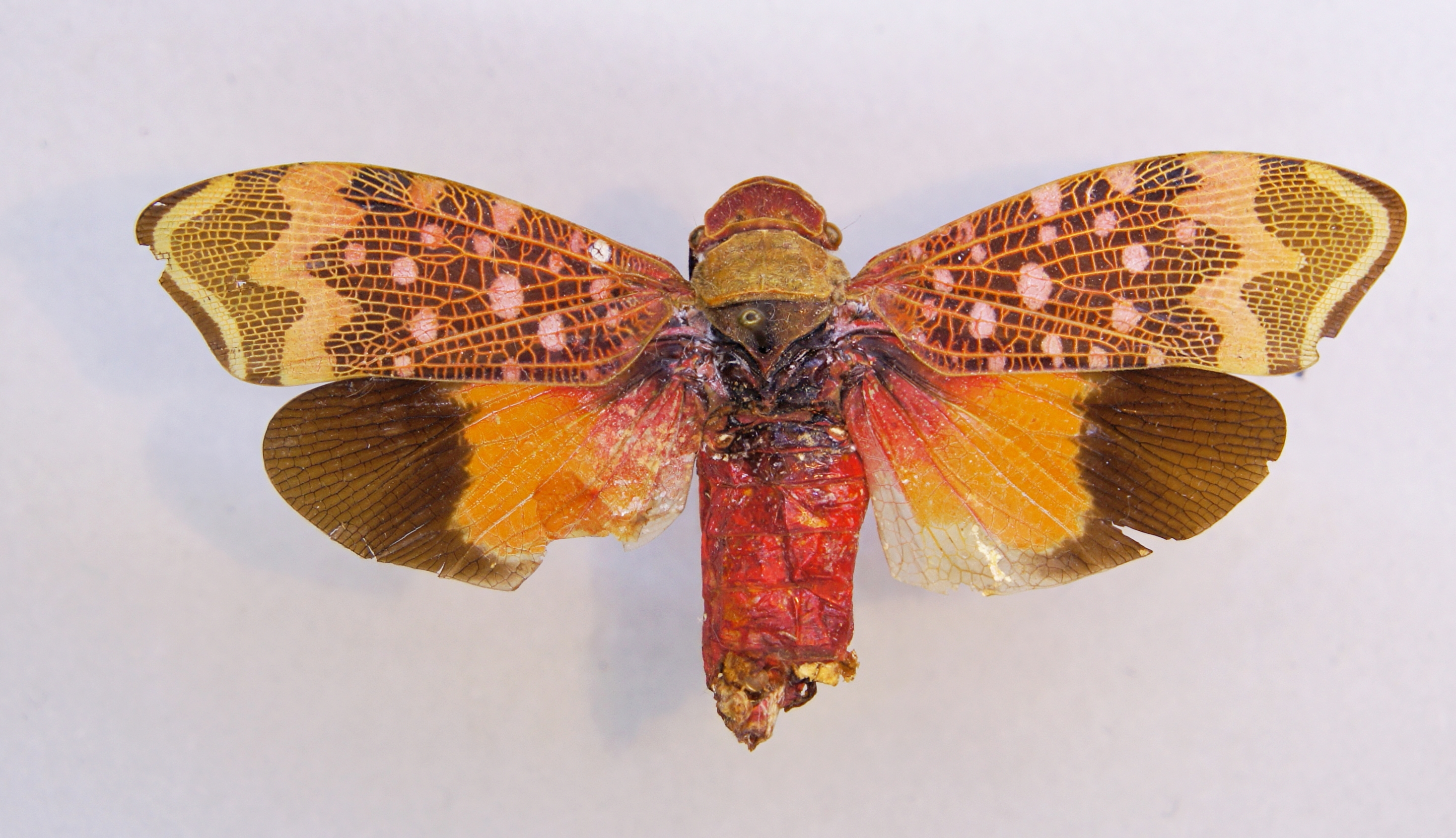

Scientific classification
- Kingdom: Animalia
- Phylum: Arthropoda
- Clade: Pancrustacea
- Class: Insecta
- Order: Hemiptera
- Suborder: Auchenorrhyncha
- Infraorder: Fulgoromorpha
- Family: Fulgoridae
- Genus: Amantia
- Species: A. combusta

Binomial name
- Amantia combusta (Westwood, 1845)

= Amantia combusta =

Species of lanternfly

Amantia combusta is a species of lanternfly found in Colombia and Ecuador. It is also found in Venezuela.

== Identification ==
The most similar taxon is Amantia peruana peruana, and it can be separated by the more prominent spots and the stripe at about 3/4ths of the tegmen, which is more curly and contrasted from the more basal areas in comparison.
