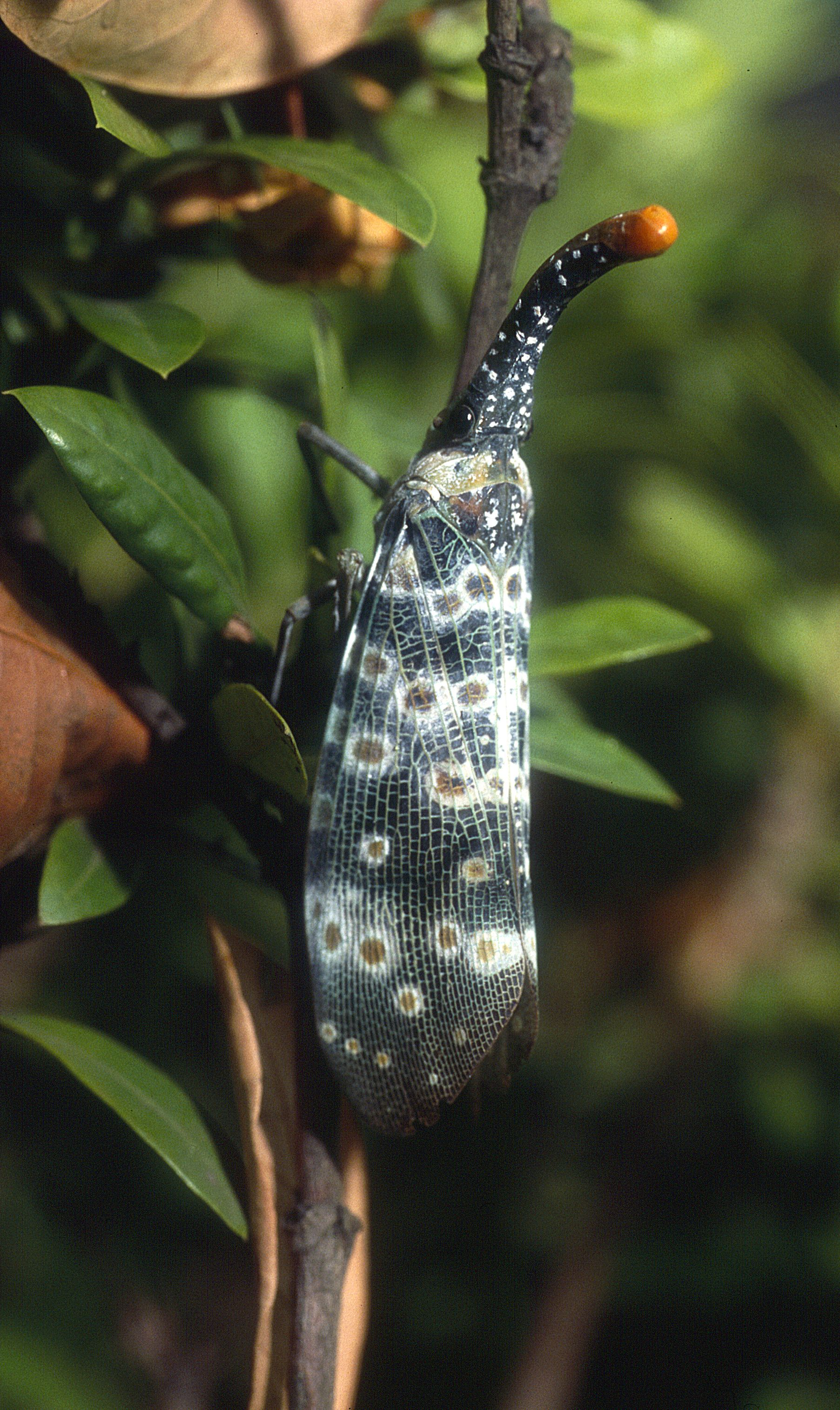

Scientific classification
- Domain: Eukaryota
- Kingdom: Animalia
- Phylum: Arthropoda
- Class: Insecta
- Order: Hemiptera
- Suborder: Auchenorrhyncha
- Infraorder: Fulgoromorpha
- Family: Fulgoridae
- Genus: Pyrops
- Species: P. lathburii

Binomial name
- Pyrops lathburii (Kirby, 1818)

Synonyms
- Fulgora lathburii Kirby, 1818; Fulgora lothburii Kirby, 1818; Hotinus lathburi (Kirby, 1818)

= Pyrops lathburii =

Species of lanternfly

Pyrops lathburii is a species of lanternfly found in northern India, northern Thailand, southern China, Laos, and Vietnam.

== Description and identification ==
Pyrops lathburii is a variable species. Its head, thorax, and abdomen range from brown to black, its hindwings from yellow to white, the apex of its cephalic process from yellow to red, and the tegmen all the way from white with unmargined black spots to black or very dark with yellow, margined spots and green veins. However, it can be identified by the apex of its cephalic process, which is distinctly brightened, but without a similar pattern at two-thirds of the wings as in Pyrops pythicus.

It was previously placed in the pyrorhynchus group; it was moved to the candelaria group because of its hindwings.
