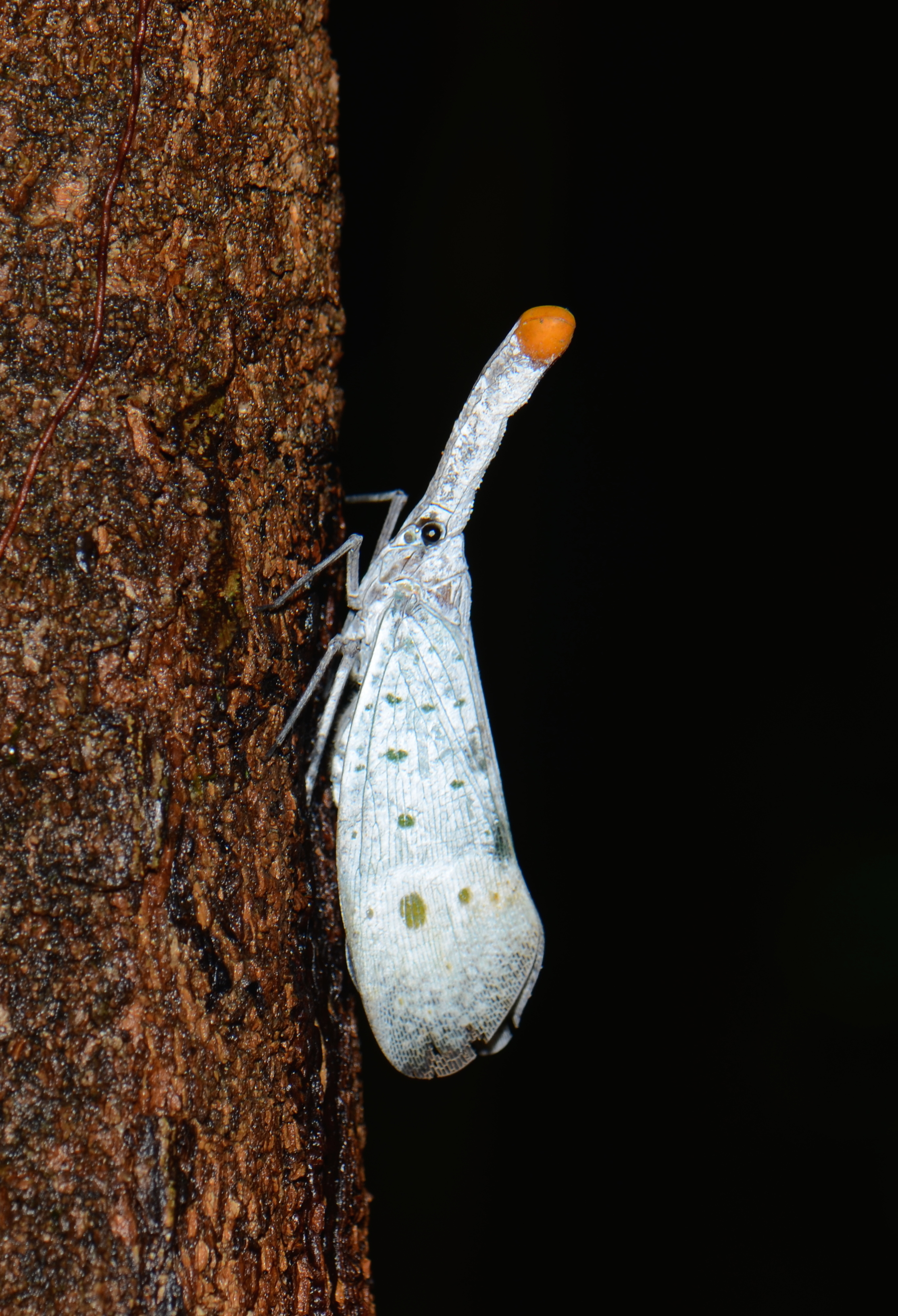

Scientific classification
- Domain: Eukaryota
- Kingdom: Animalia
- Phylum: Arthropoda
- Class: Insecta
- Order: Hemiptera
- Suborder: Auchenorrhyncha
- Infraorder: Fulgoromorpha
- Family: Fulgoridae
- Genus: Pyrops
- Species: P. ruehli

Binomial name
- Pyrops ruehli Schmid, 1926

Synonyms
- Pyrops farinosa Schmidt, 1923 (Preoccupied by Pyrops farinosus); Pyrops rühli Schmidt, 1926; Laternaria rühli Schmidt, 1926

= Pyrops ruehli =

Species of insects

Pyrops ruehli is a species of lanternfly.

== Distribution ==
It is found only on the island of Sumatra. It was recorded from Malaysia, but that record is based on Pyrops pyrorhynchus midentified as ruehli.
