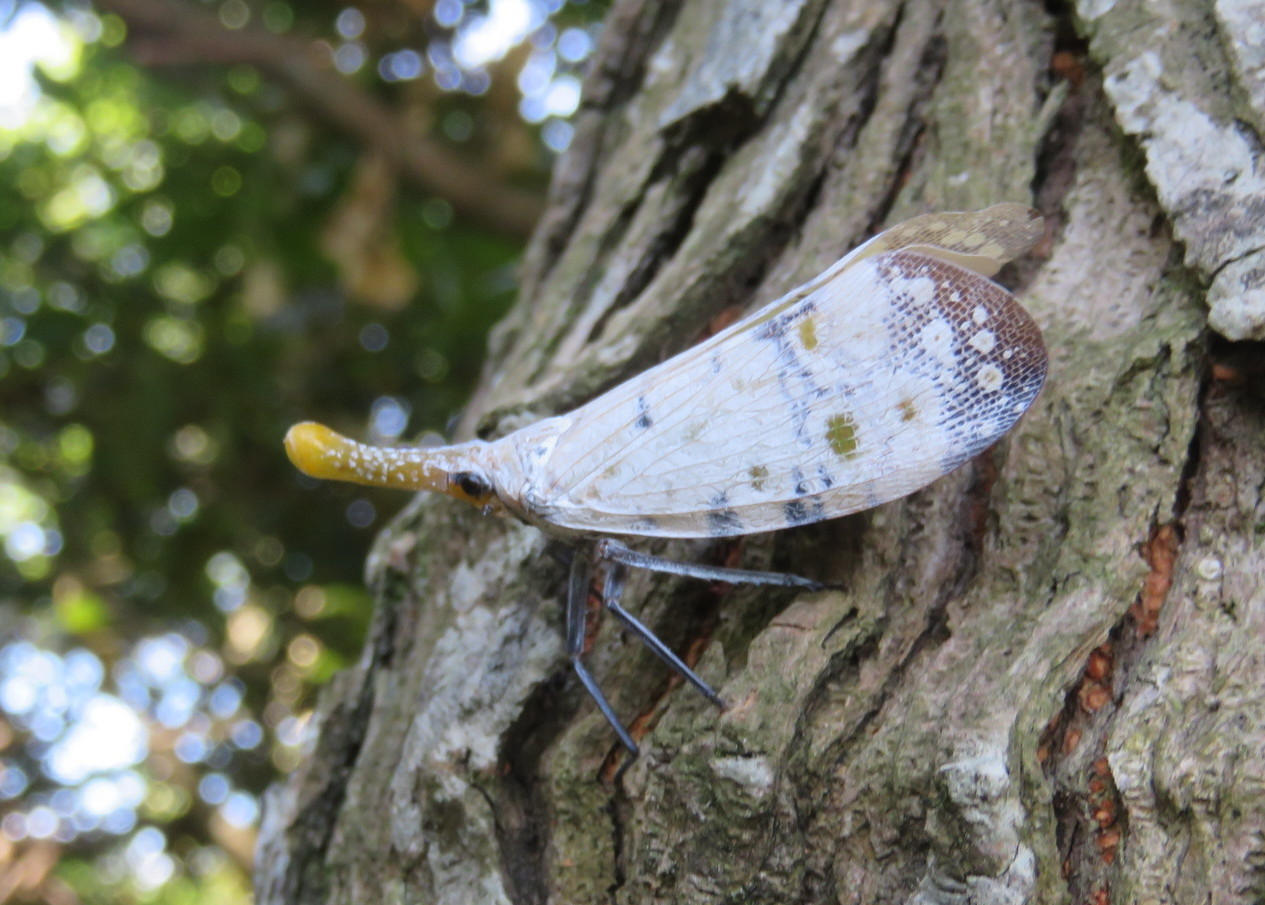

Scientific classification
- Kingdom: Animalia
- Phylum: Arthropoda
- Class: Insecta
- Order: Hemiptera
- Suborder: Auchenorrhyncha
- Infraorder: Fulgoromorpha
- Family: Fulgoridae
- Genus: Pyrops
- Species: P. watanabei

Binomial name
- Pyrops watanabei (Matsumura, 1913)

Synonyms
- Fulgora watanabei Matsumura, 1913; Pyrops chimara (Schumacher, 1915)

= Pyrops watanabei =

Species of true bug

Pyrops watanabei is a species of planthopper endemic to Taiwan. Pyrops atroalbus was formerly considered a subspecies; its status as a species was reinstated in 2017. P. watanabei was first described by Shōnen Matsumura in 1913 as Fulgora watanabei.

It has a yellow cephalic process with an inflated apex. The abdomen is red ventrally, and the tegmina are mainly white, with three black spots on the leading edge (costal area). The posterior wings may be completely white or have a black apical third. It is about 4 cm (1.6 in) long.

It has been recorded on the plants Triadica sebifera and Sapium discolor.
