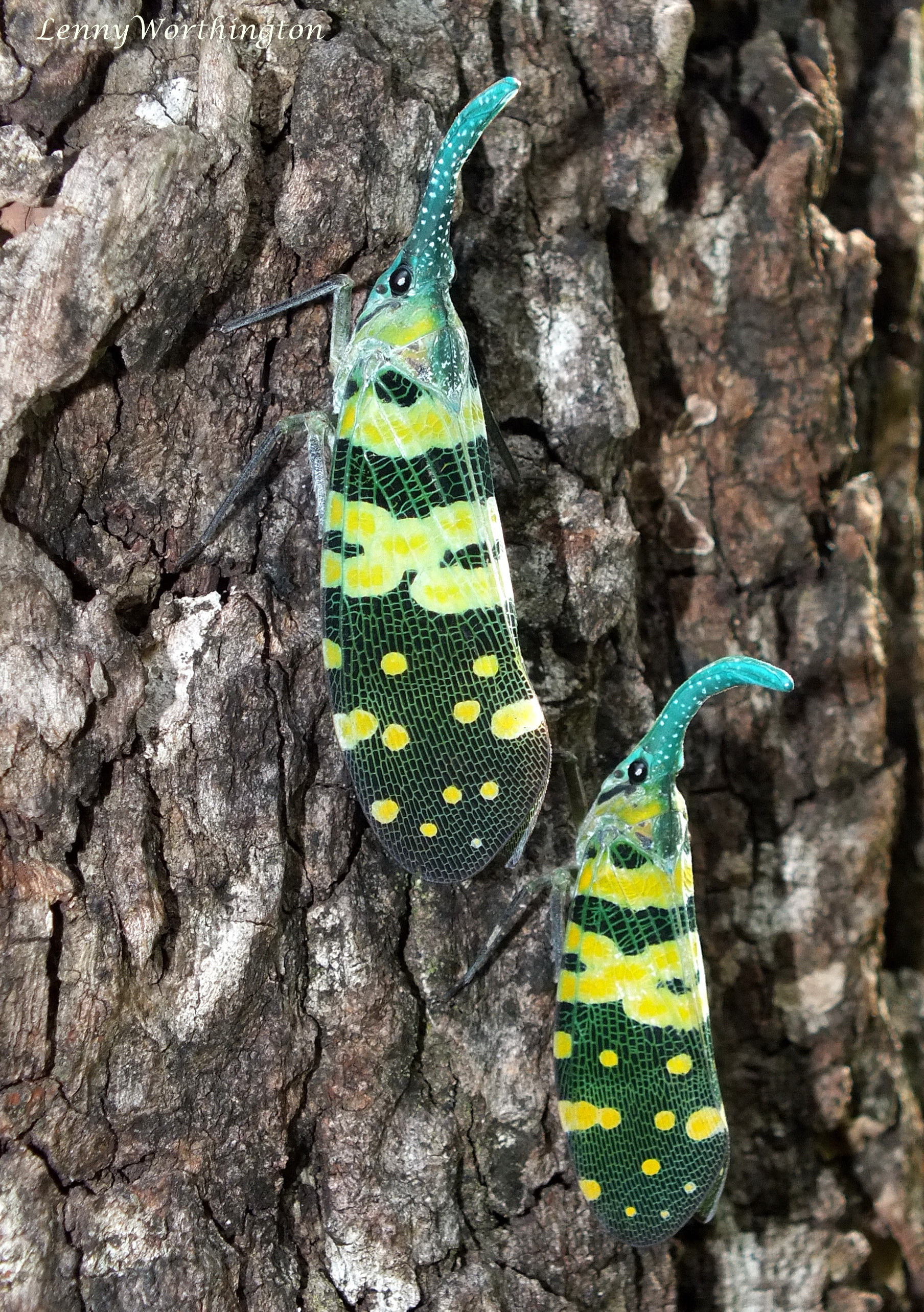

Scientific classification
- Domain: Eukaryota
- Kingdom: Animalia
- Phylum: Arthropoda
- Class: Insecta
- Order: Hemiptera
- Suborder: Auchenorrhyncha
- Infraorder: Fulgoromorpha
- Family: Fulgoridae
- Genus: Pyrops
- Species: P. viridirostris

Binomial name
- Pyrops viridirostris (Westwood, 1848)

Synonyms
- Hotinus viridirostris; Fulgora viridirostris; Fulgora brevirostris

= Pyrops viridirostris =

Species of planthopper

Pyrops viridirostris is a species of lanternfly of the family Fulgoridae found in NE India and Indochina.

== Identification ==
At the most, this species may be confused with P. candelaria, its closest relative, but can be distinguished by the middle of the thorax, the head, and the femora Turk (all of which are red or orange in P. candelaria).
