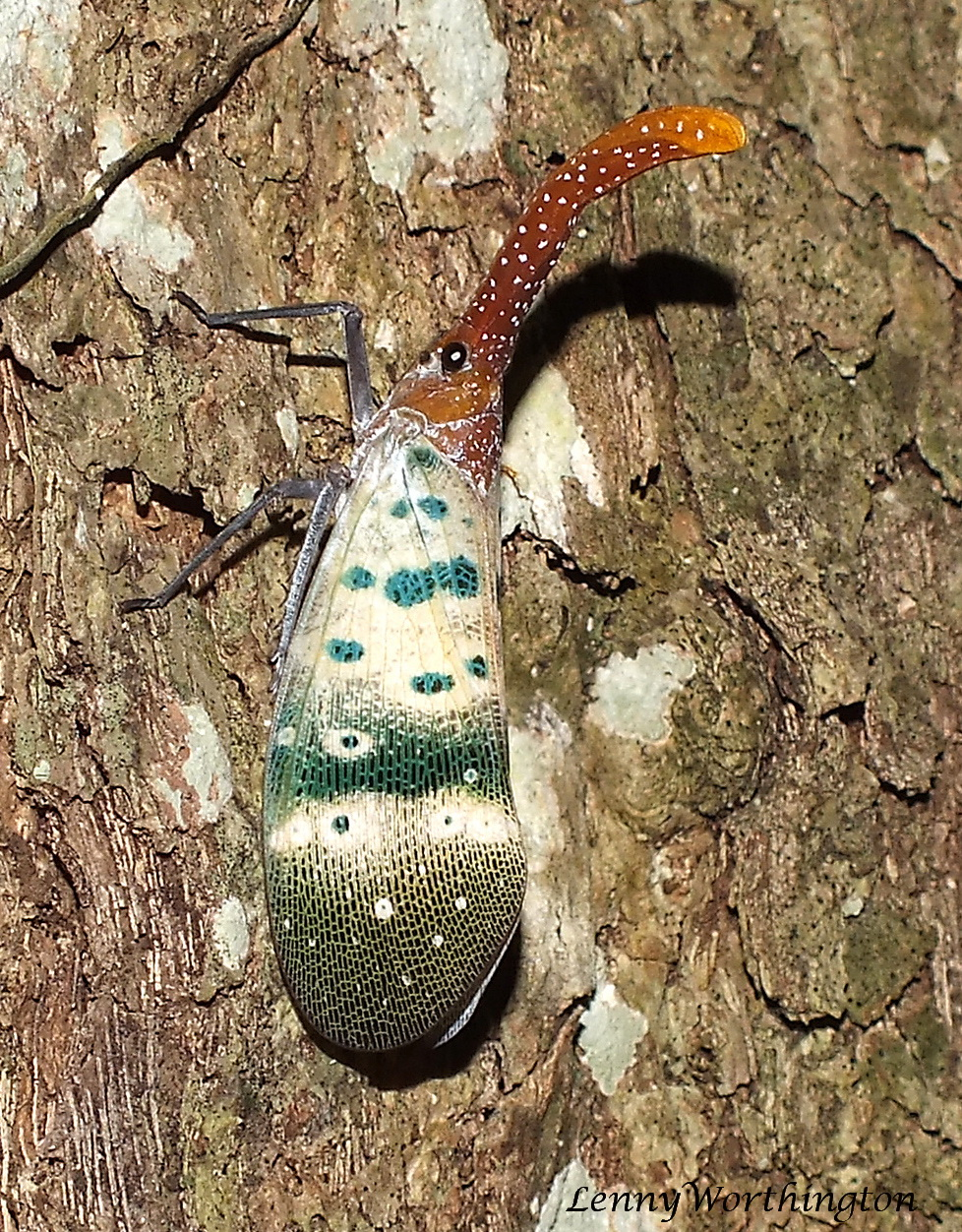

Scientific classification
- Domain: Eukaryota
- Kingdom: Animalia
- Phylum: Arthropoda
- Class: Insecta
- Order: Hemiptera
- Suborder: Auchenorrhyncha
- Infraorder: Fulgoromorpha
- Family: Fulgoridae
- Genus: Pyrops
- Species: P. ducalis

Binomial name
- Pyrops ducalis (Stål, 1863)

= Pyrops ducalis =

Species of lanternflies

Pyrops ducalis is a species from the Fulgoridae family of lanternflies.

== Description and identification ==
The head, thorax and abdomen are orange to red, with the head brightened apically. The forewings (tegmina) are green with green spots, with the basal half and area at two-thirds of the tegmina white. The basal patch of the hindwings is white or luteous. The shape of the cephalic process combined with white areas on tegmina will differentiate it from all species but P. coelestinus, from which it differs by having a red, not brown, cephalic process; dark green, not yellow, spots on the tegimen; and a different pattern of white on the tegmina.

== Range and ecology ==
It is known from Thailand, Vietnam and Cambodia. It is known to feed on the sap of Dimocarpus longan.

== Taxonomy ==
It is currently classified under the Pyrops candelaria group.
