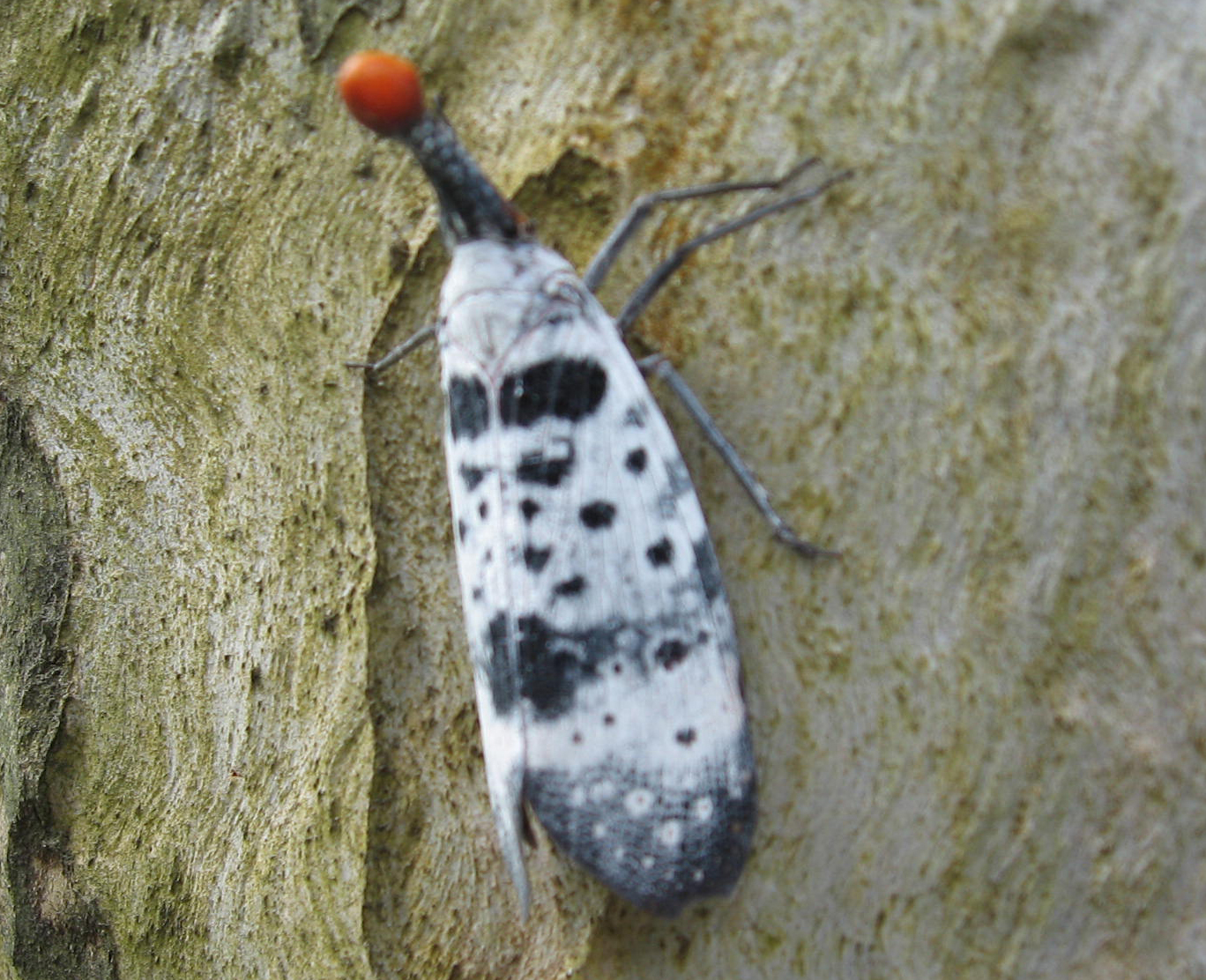
- Specimen from Assam

Scientific classification
- Kingdom: Animalia
- Phylum: Arthropoda
- Class: Insecta
- Order: Hemiptera
- Suborder: Auchenorrhyncha
- Infraorder: Fulgoromorpha
- Family: Fulgoridae
- Genus: Pyrops
- Species: P. clavatus

Binomial name
- Pyrops clavatus (Westwood, 1839)

Synonyms
- Fulgora clavata Westwood, 1839; Hotinus clavato Stål, 1854 (Missp.); Hotinus ponderosus Stål, 1854; Fulgora calavata Butler, 1874 (Missp.); Fulgora ponderus Matsumura, 1913 (Missp.); Fulgora woodi Ollenbach, 1929; Fulgora nigripennis Chou & Wang, 1985; Fulgora clavata mizunumai Satô & Nagai, 1994

= Pyrops clavatus =

Species of true bug

Pyrops clavatus is a species of true bug in the family Fulgoridae, in the genus Pyrops which are sometimes called "lanternflies". This species is found in parts of northern and northeastern India, Myanmar, northern Thailand, southern China and northern Vietnam. The tip of the elongated head capsule is spheroidal, shiny and chestnut in colour while the remainder of the process is black with fine white spotting. The forewing has a variable patterning of black, grey and white. The hindwing is purplish white with the apical half black. Specimens have been obtained along the Himalayas west to Mussoorie (a specimen of which had the entire cephalic process dull red) but more often in Assam, Sikkim, Shillong and the Khasi Hills.

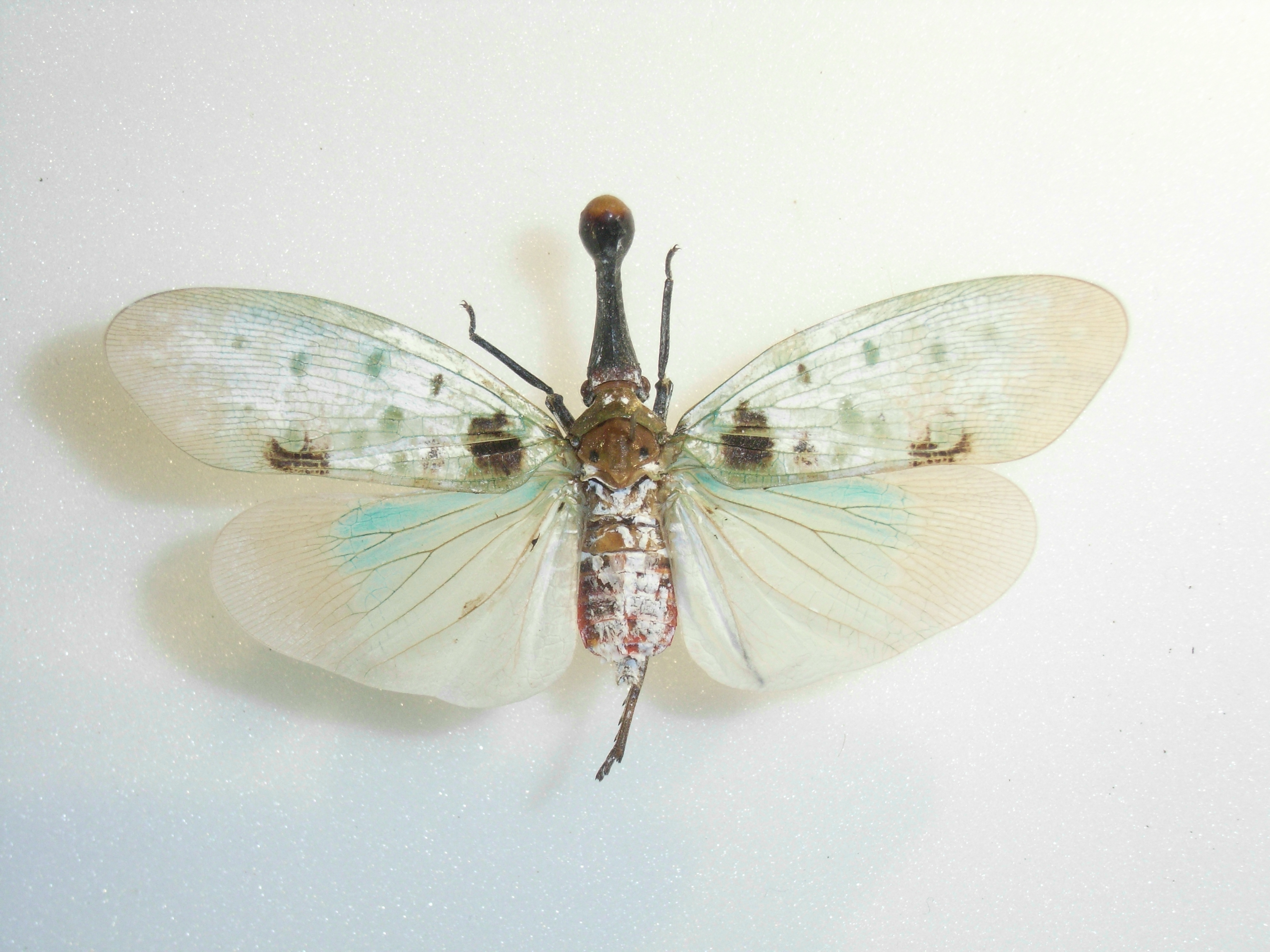
Old museum specimen

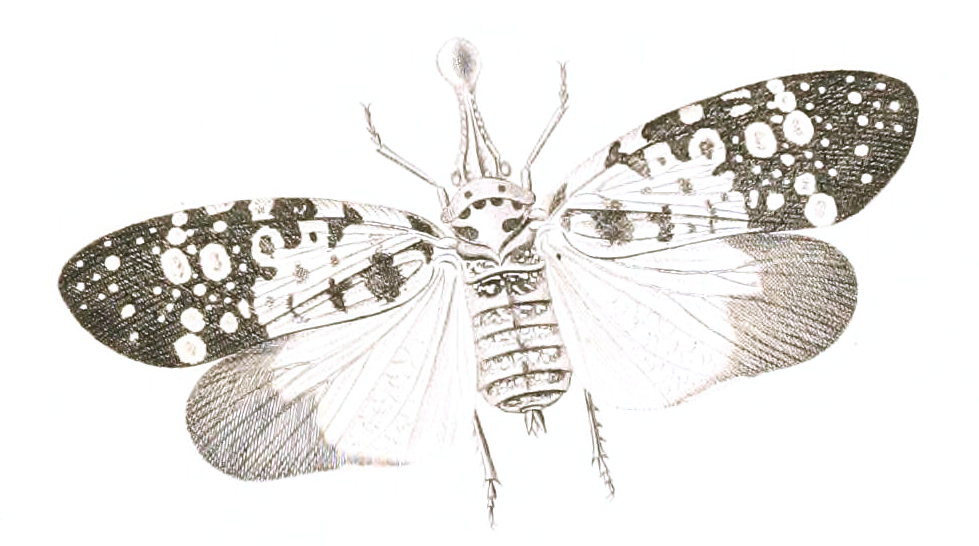
Illustration by Westwood (1839)

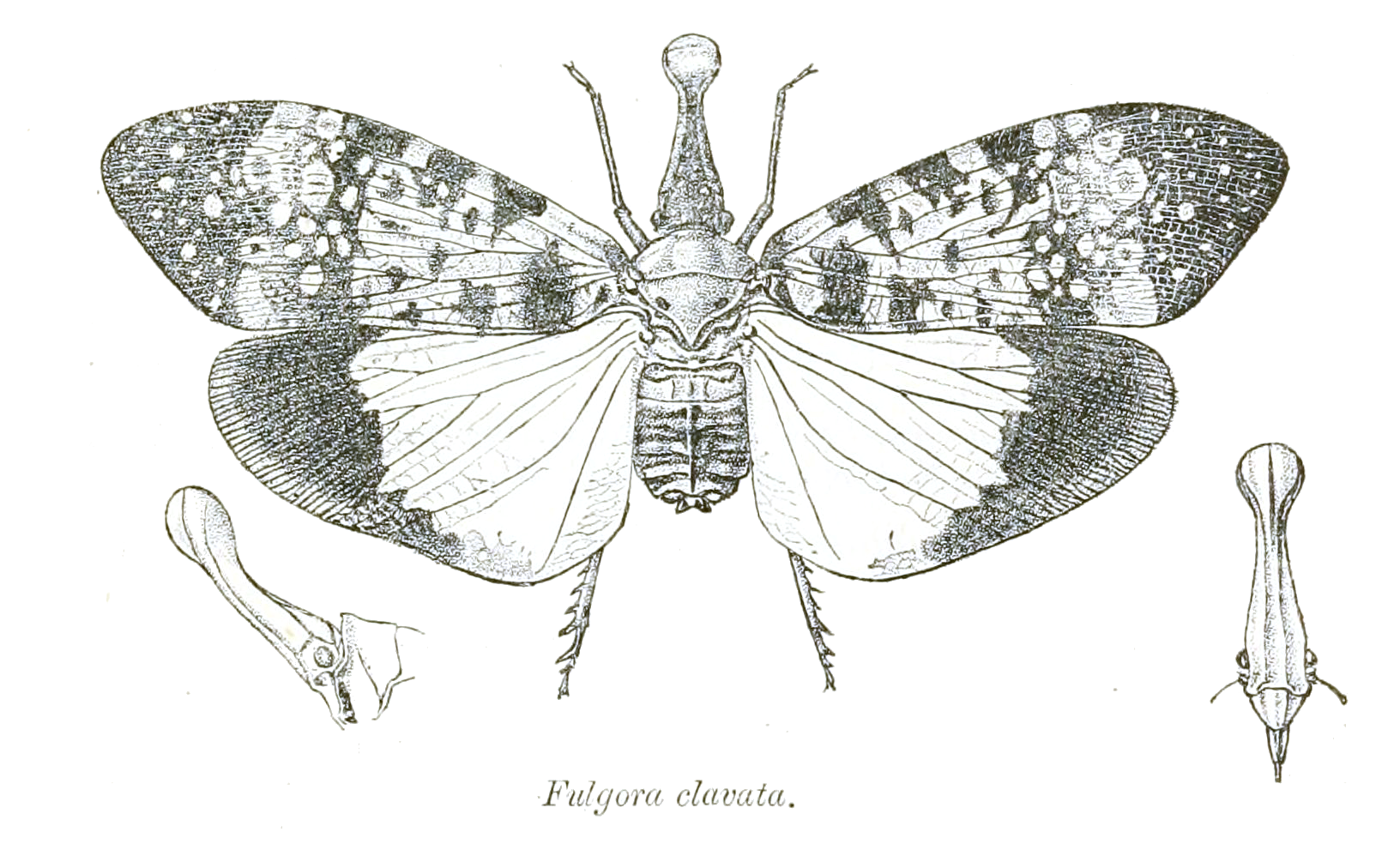
Illustration from Distant (1906)

The species was described by John Obadiah Westwood in 1839 in the Transactions of the Linnean Society under the genus Fulgora. The type specimen came from Assam through the collections of Theodore Edward Cantor based on which Westwood described the key features in Latin, noting specifically the upward curve of the cephalic process with its enlarged and rounded dull-brick-red tip, "apiceque adscendente, et in globum subrotundum, subpellucidum, laete testaceum terminato". He also illustrated the specimen in black and white. The middle segment of the upperside of the thorax has a black spot on each side. The underside of the abdomen is reddish. Arthur Gardiner Butler described the tip of the rostrum as bearing a "ludicrous resemblance to a "vesuvian" cigar-light" (a kind of early matchstick used to light cigars).

A paler form which was described as a subspecies mizunumai (Sato & Nagai, 1994) is not considered valid.
