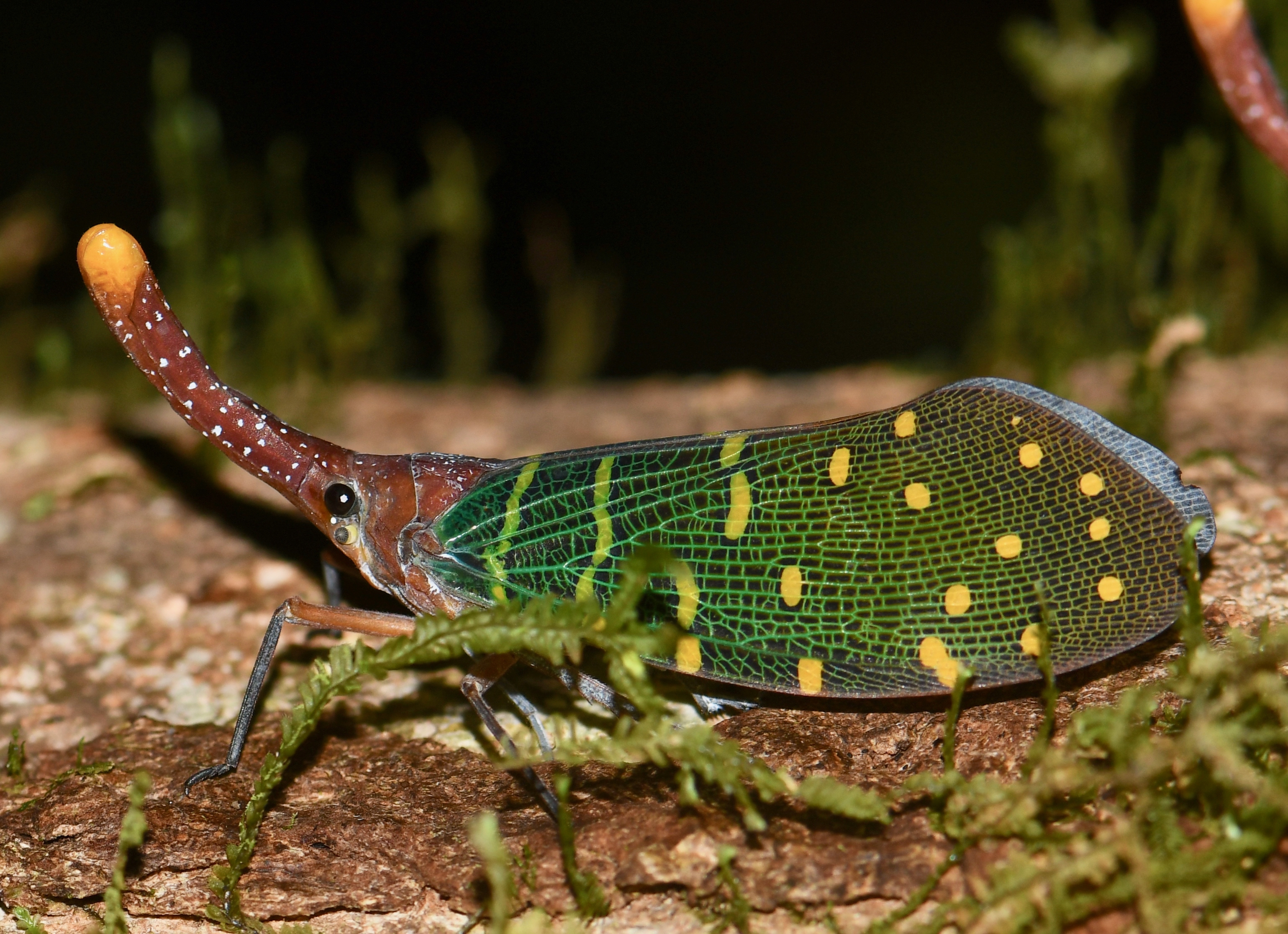

Scientific classification
- Kingdom: Animalia
- Phylum: Arthropoda
- Class: Insecta
- Order: Hemiptera
- Suborder: Auchenorrhyncha
- Infraorder: Fulgoromorpha
- Family: Fulgoridae
- Genus: Pyrops
- Species: P. intricatus

Binomial name
- Pyrops intricatus (Walker, 1857)

Synonyms
- Hotinus intricatus Walker, 1857; Fulgora intricata (Walker, 1857); Pyrops intricata (Walker, 1857); Fulgora stellata Butler, 1874

= Pyrops intricatus =

Species of true bug

Pyrops intricatus is a species of lantern bug, an insect in the family Fulgoridae, found in Borneo. It was originally described in 1857 by Francis Walker as Hotinus intricatus.

== Description ==
Walker described the male of the species as follows:

Ferruginous. Rostrum slightly curved and ascending, sprinkled with white flecks, rounded and luteous at the tip, a little shorter than the body. Abdomen black; hind borders of the segments green. Tibiae and tarsi black. Fore wings black, with three testaceous interior bands, and with twelve exterior luteous spots; 3rd band interrupted; veins green, brighter on the interior part than on the exterior part, where they are differently arranged. Hind wings bright bluish-grecn, with very broad purplish-black borders. Length of the body without the rostrum 11 lines; of the wings 33 lines. This species is closely allied to H. maculatus, Oliv., but in the latter species the rostrum is wholly black and more slender at the tip; the fore wings have green spots and no bands, and the blue part of the hind wings extends more towards the borders in front and less so hindward.

== Subspecies ==
Subspecies include:

- Pyrops intricatus albobasalis (Lallemand, 1960)
- Pyrops intricatus intricatus (Walker, 1857)
