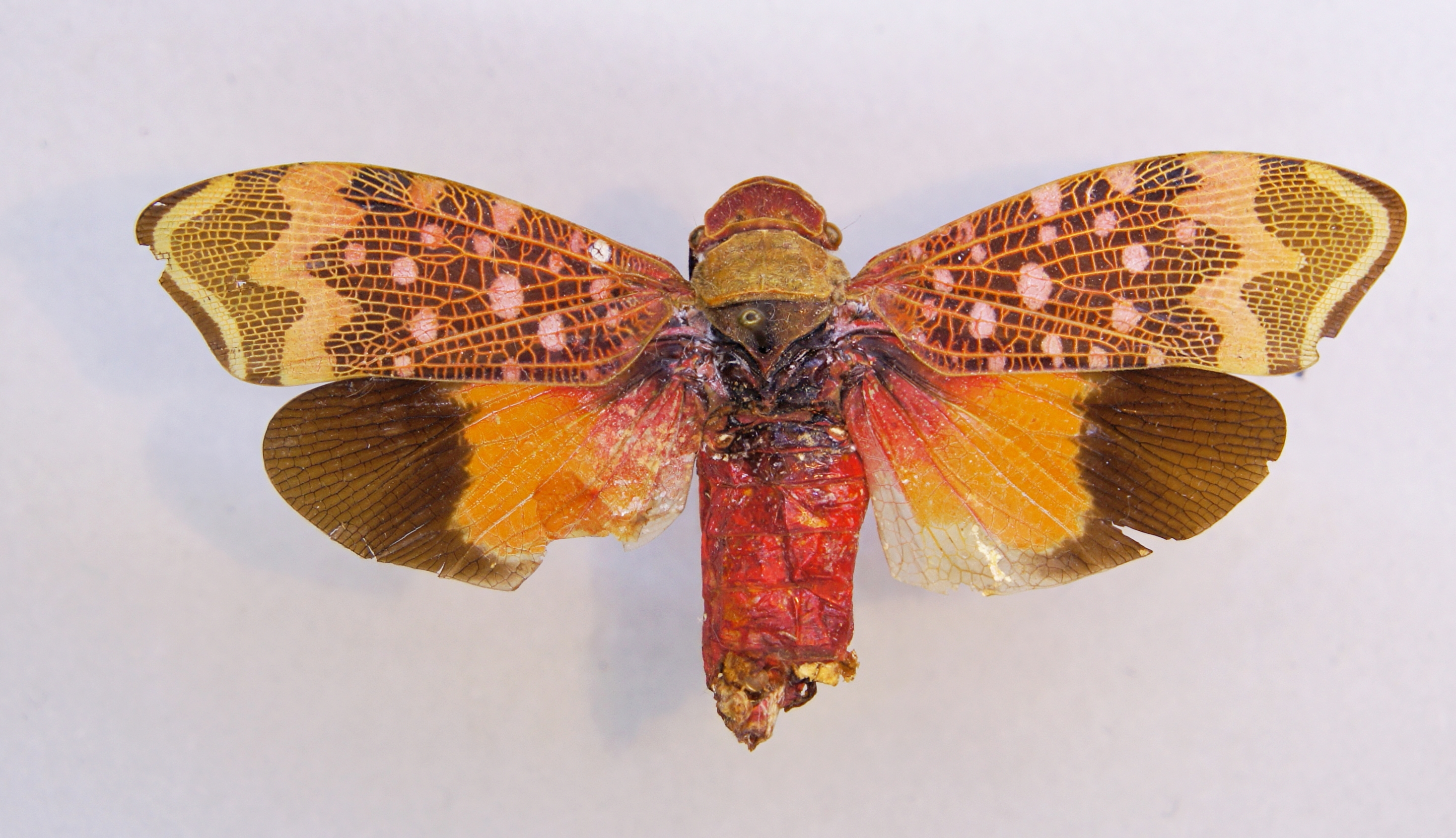
- Amantia combusta

Scientific classification
- Kingdom: Animalia
- Phylum: Arthropoda
- Clade: Pancrustacea
- Class: Insecta
- Order: Hemiptera
- Suborder: Auchenorrhyncha
- Infraorder: Fulgoromorpha
- Family: Fulgoridae
- Subfamily: Poiocerinae
- Tribe: Poiocerini
- Genus: Amantia; Stål, 1864

= Amantia (planthopper) =

Genus of planthoppers

Amantia is a genus of planthoppers in the family Fulgoridae, subfamily Poiocerinae. Species are distributed from Panama to Peru.

== Species ==
- Amantia combusta (Westwood, 1845)
- Amantia imperatoria (Gerstaecker, 1860)
- Amantia magnifica Schmidt, 1910
- Amantia peruana Schmidt, 1910 (2 subspecies)
