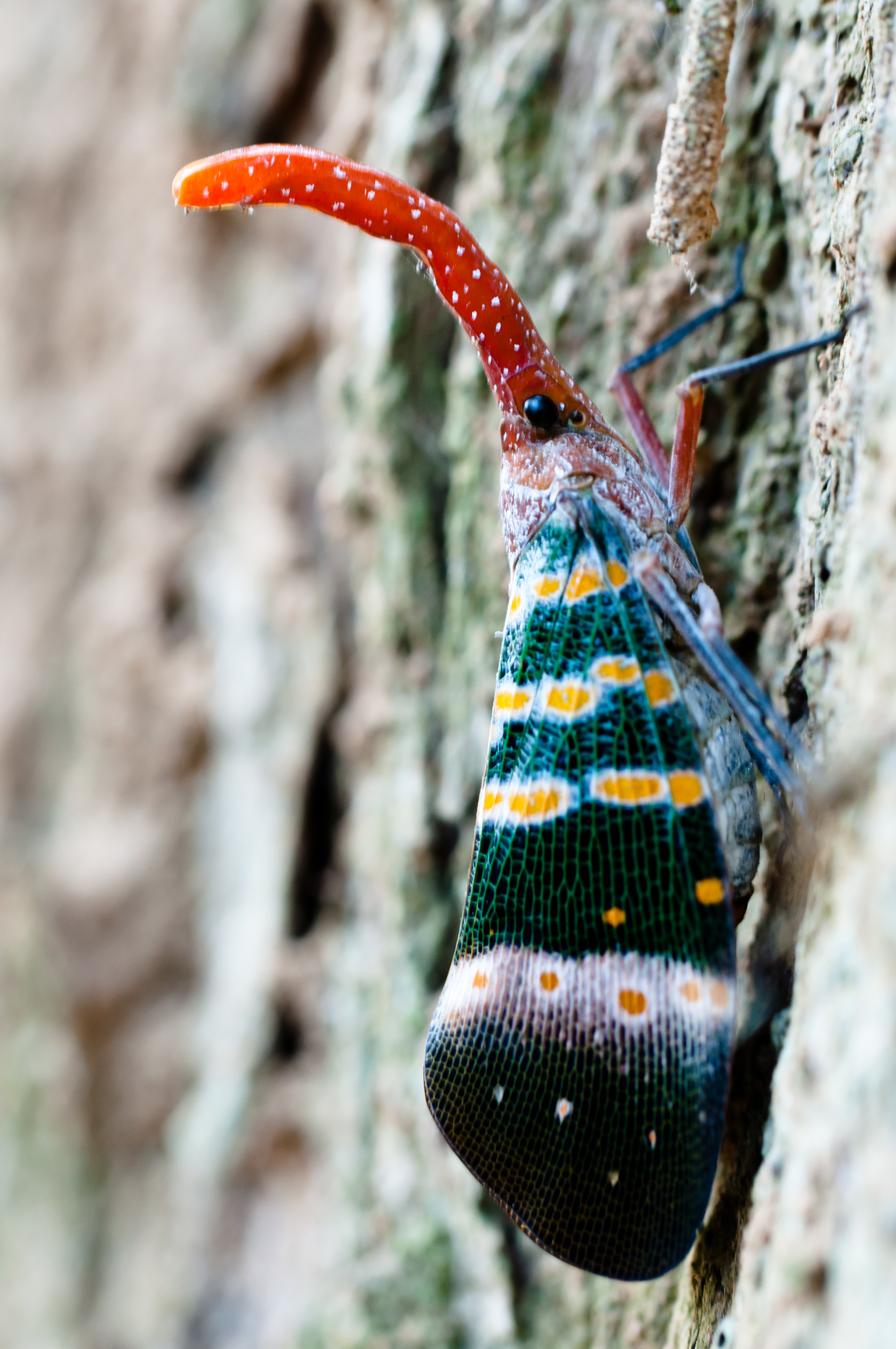
- Specimen from Kaeng Krachan National Park

Scientific classification
- Kingdom: Animalia
- Phylum: Arthropoda
- Clade: Pancrustacea
- Class: Insecta
- Order: Hemiptera
- Suborder: Auchenorrhyncha
- Infraorder: Fulgoromorpha
- Family: Fulgoridae
- Genus: Pyrops
- Species: P. karenius

Binomial name
- Pyrops karenius (Distant, 1891)

Synonyms
- Fulgora karenia Distant 1891

= Pyrops karenius =

Species of true bug

Pyrops karenius, also known as the Red-nosed Lanternfly, is a species of planthopper belonging to a group commonly referred to as lantern-flies. This species is found in Burma, Thailand, Malaysia and the Karen Hills of India. The head, its protrusion and the thorax are reddish brown. The cephalic process is slightly recurved and its tip is flattened.
