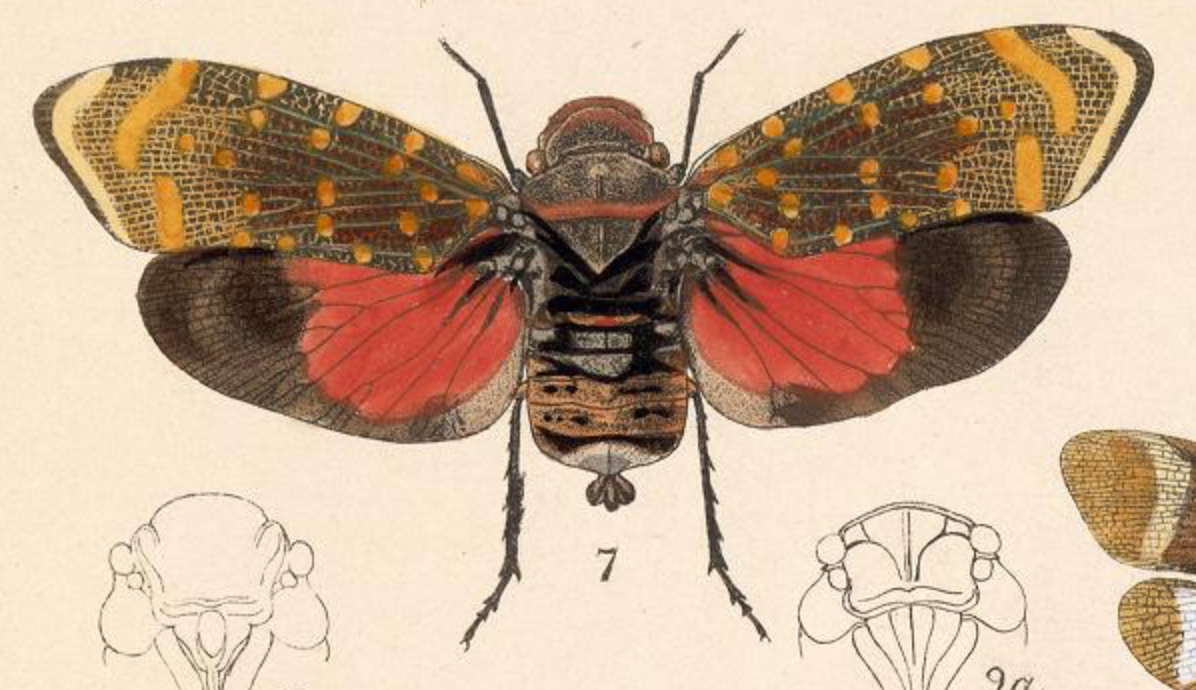
- Amantia imperatoria from Distant & Fowler 1887

Scientific classification
- Domain: Eukaryota
- Kingdom: Animalia
- Phylum: Arthropoda
- Class: Insecta
- Order: Hemiptera
- Suborder: Auchenorrhyncha
- Infraorder: Fulgoromorpha
- Family: Fulgoridae
- Genus: Amantia
- Species: A. imperatoria

Binomial name
- Amantia imperatoria (Gerstaecker, 1860)

Synonyms
- Poiocera imperatoria Gerstaecker, 1860; Poeocera [sic] imperatoria Gerstaecker, 1860

= Amantia imperatoria =

Species of planthopper

Amantia imperatoria is a species of lanternfly found in Costa Rica and Panama.

== Description ==
This species can be distinguished from other Amantia species by the interrupted sub apical fore stripe of the tegmen.

The overall colour is blue or black, depending on the variety. In the blue variety, the body is mostly blue, the head orange, the spots are larger and the stripe is thicker. In the black one, the blue is replaced by black, the spots are smaller and the stripes are thinner, yellow, and the head is red. The base of the hind wings is also red in both varieties. It is the only Amantia species know from Central America.
