= Amantia peruana =

Scientific classification
- Kingdom: Animalia
- Phylum: Arthropoda
- Clade: Pancrustacea
- Class: Insecta
- Order: Hemiptera
- Suborder: Auchenorrhyncha
- Infraorder: Fulgoromorpha
- Family: Fulgoridae
- Genus: Amantia
- Species: A. peruana

Binomial name
- Amantia peruana Schmidt, 1910

Species of planthopper

Amantia peruana is a species of lanternfly found in Peru.

== Description ==
The head of A. peruana is red and the prothorax is peach-colored. The mesothorax and scutellum are brown. The eyes are red and the tegmen is either a black or very dark red with bright veins.

== Subspecies ==
There are two subspecies:

- Amantia peruana peruana, which has spots and two wavy apical fasciae, the more basal of which is significantly thicker, on the tegmen.
- Amantia peruana infasciata, which has no spots and two wavy apical fasciae, the more basal of which is slightly thicker, on the tegmen.
