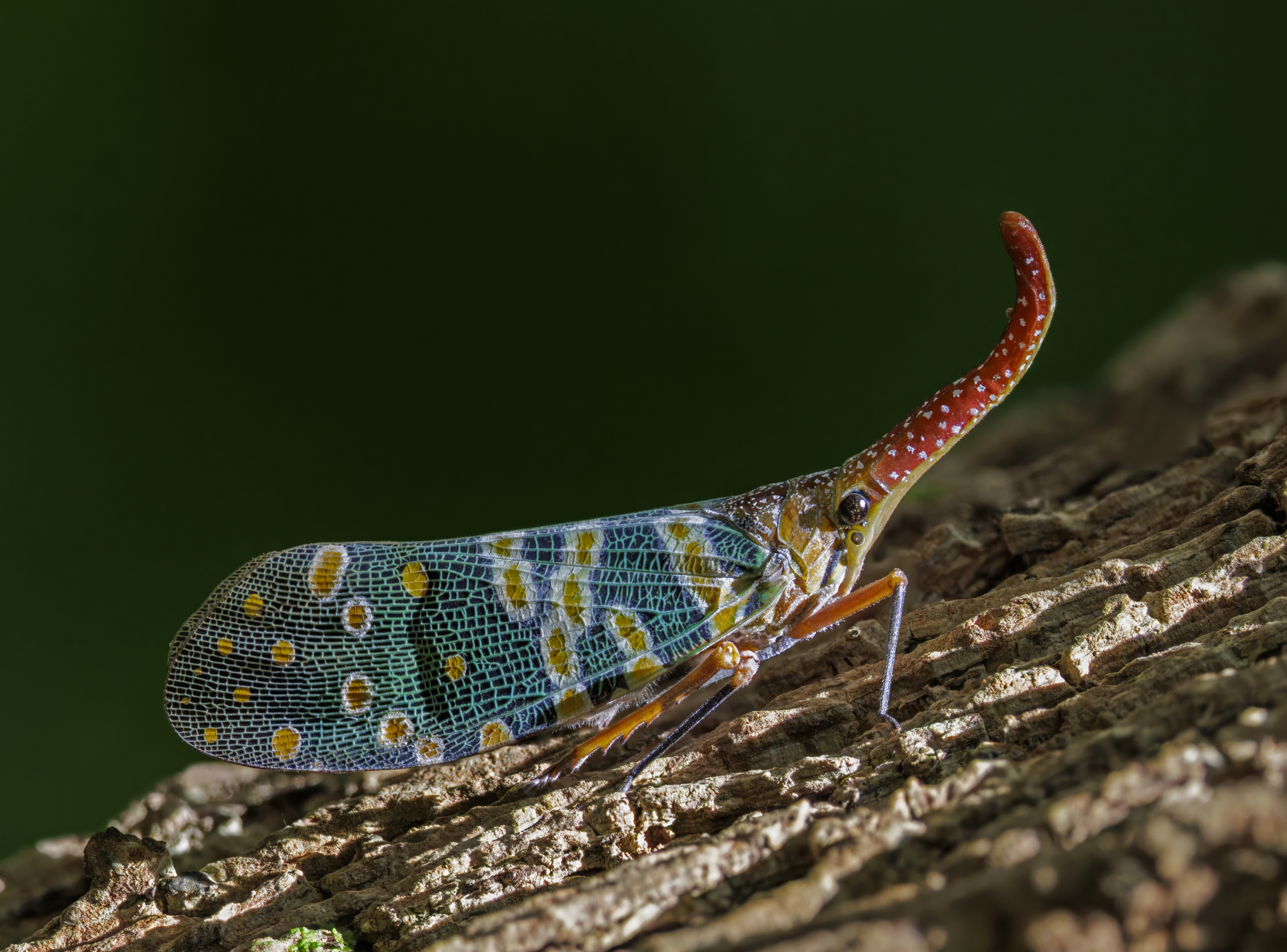
- In Hong Kong

Scientific classification
- Kingdom: Animalia
- Phylum: Arthropoda
- Clade: Pancrustacea
- Class: Insecta
- Order: Hemiptera
- Suborder: Auchenorrhyncha
- Infraorder: Fulgoromorpha
- Family: Fulgoridae
- Genus: Pyrops
- Species: P. candelaria

Binomial name
- Pyrops candelaria (Linnaeus, 1758)

Synonyms
- Cicada candelaria Linné, 1758; Fulgora candelaria (Linnaeus, 1758); Hotinus candelaria (Linnaeus, 1758); Laternaria candelaria (Linnaeus, 1758); Fulgora candellaria Scopoli, 1772 (Missp.); Fulgora candelariae Kirby, 1818 (Missp.)

= Pyrops candelaria =

Species of true bug

Pyrops candelaria (Laternaria candelaria and Fulgora candelaria in older literature) is a species of planthopper often placed in the tribe Laternariini. This species has been recorded from: Guangdong, Guangxi, Cambodia, Vietnam, Hong Kong, Laos, Thailand and other parts of southeast Asia. It is the type of the genus Pyrops established by Spinola, M. in 1839.

== Description ==
Like all Fulgoridae, P. candelaria feeds on plant sap: including longan and lychee trees (Sapindaceae), among others. Its long, slender proboscis is used to pierce tree bark to reach the phloem.

Members of this genus are sometimes called lanternflies (although lanternflies do not emit light) because of their notable 'cephalic process'. They are often sought-out by collectors, attracted by their fore wings (see figure), yellow-orange hind wings with a black zone around the wing tips, a reddish head and cephalic process with white spots.

This species feeds on tree sap using its elongated proboscis and contributes to nutrient cycling in tropical forest ecosystems.”

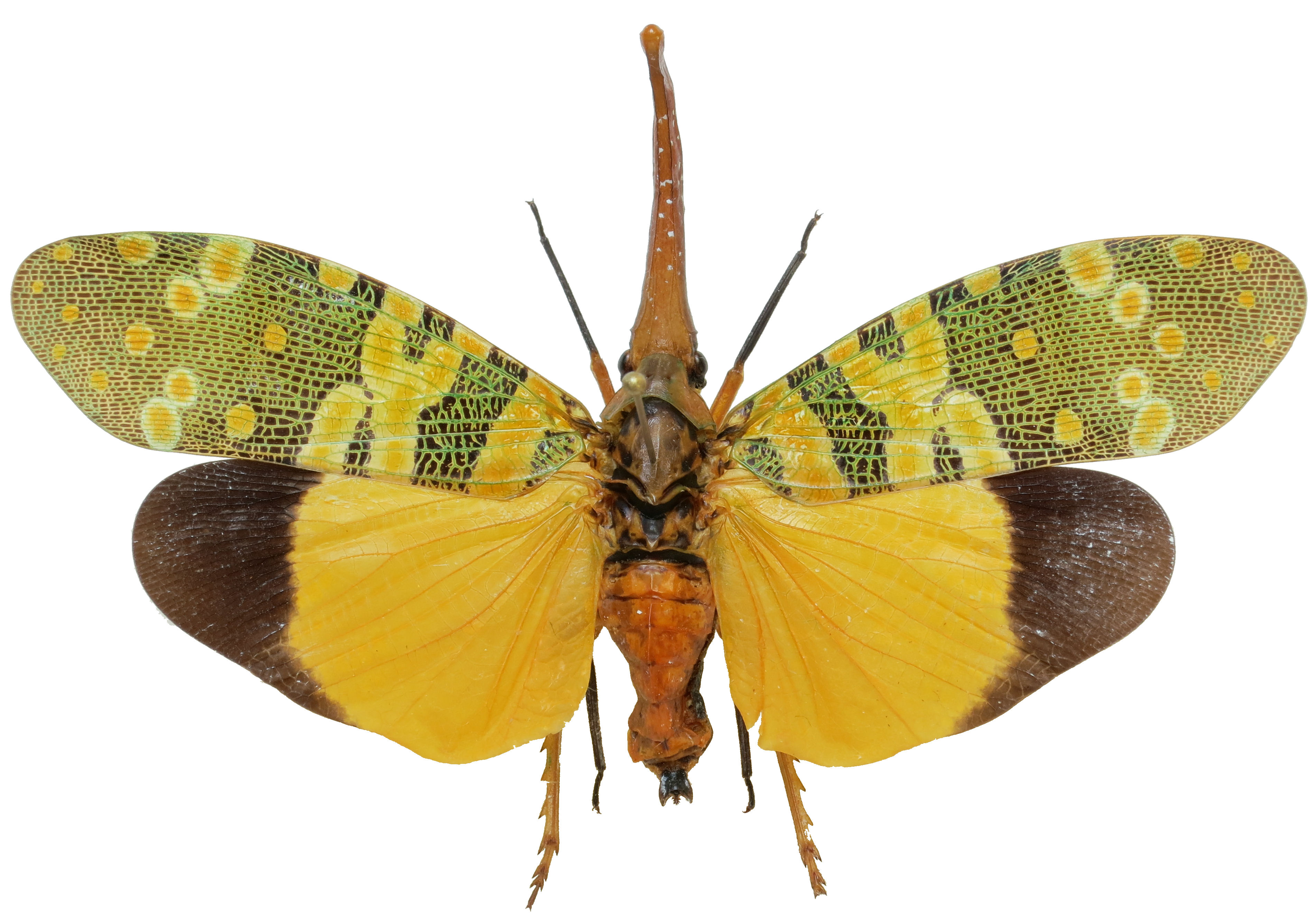
Pyrops candelaria from Umphang, Thailand
