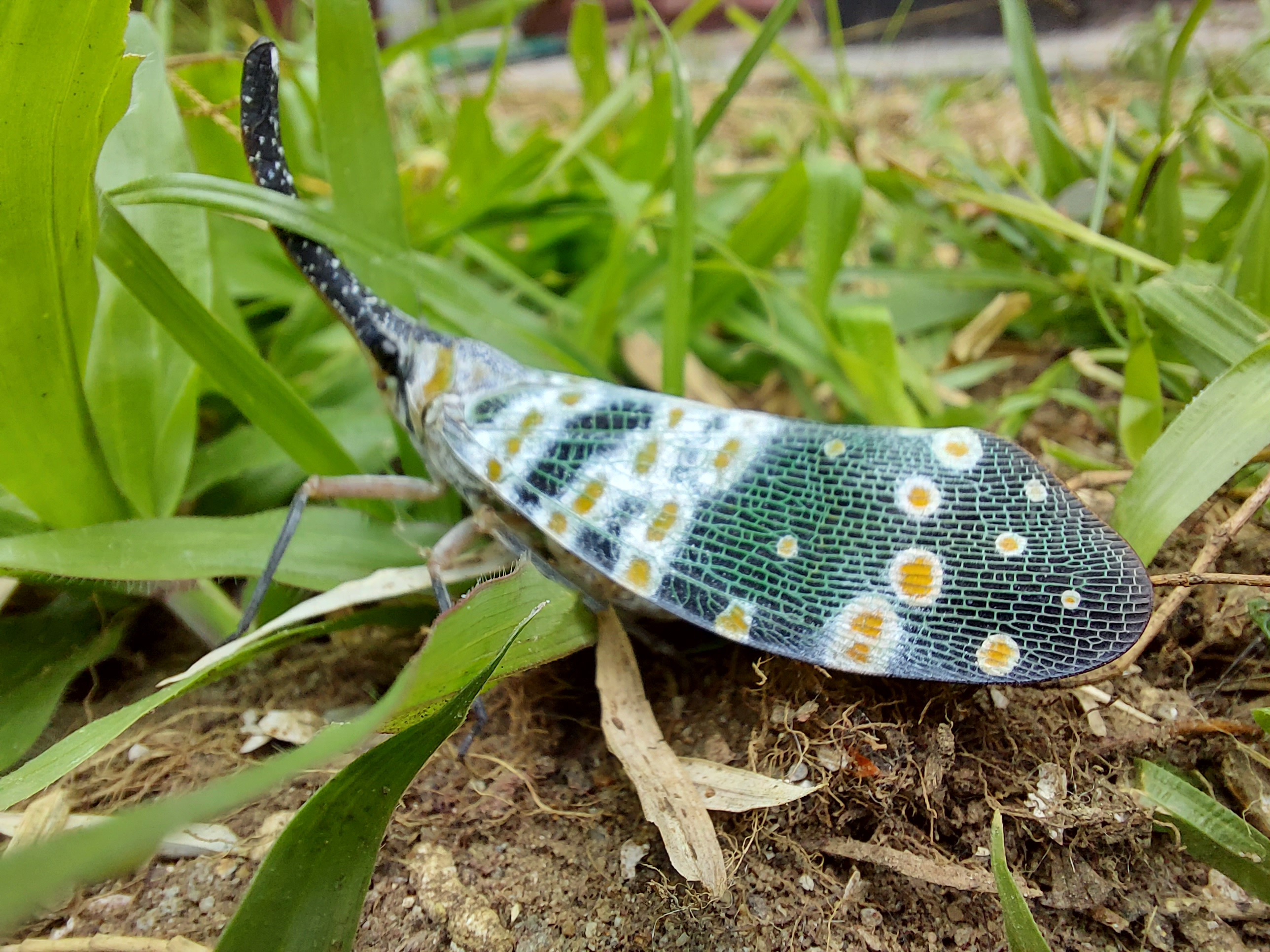
- Specimen in Namdhapha National Park, Arunachal Pradesh, India

Scientific classification
- Domain: Eukaryota
- Kingdom: Animalia
- Phylum: Arthropoda
- Class: Insecta
- Order: Hemiptera
- Suborder: Auchenorrhyncha
- Infraorder: Fulgoromorpha
- Family: Fulgoridae
- Genus: Pyrops
- Species: P. spinolae

Binomial name
- Pyrops spinolae (Westwood, 1842)

Synonyms
- Hotinus spinolae Walker, 1851; Laternaria spinolae Schaum, 1850; Fulgora spinolae Westwood, 1842; Hotinus nigrirostris Walker, 1858; Laternaria nigrirostris Walker, 1858: synonym of Fulgora spinolae Westwood, 1842

= Pyrops spinolae =

Species of true bug

Pyrops spinolae is a species of planthopper sometimes referred-to as the dark-horned lantern-fly (Vietnamese: ve sầu đầu đen). The species is named after Maximilian Spinola, the authority for the genus.

This lantern bug is recorded from India and Indochina. Pyrops condorinus from southern Thailand was once considered as a subspecies.(
