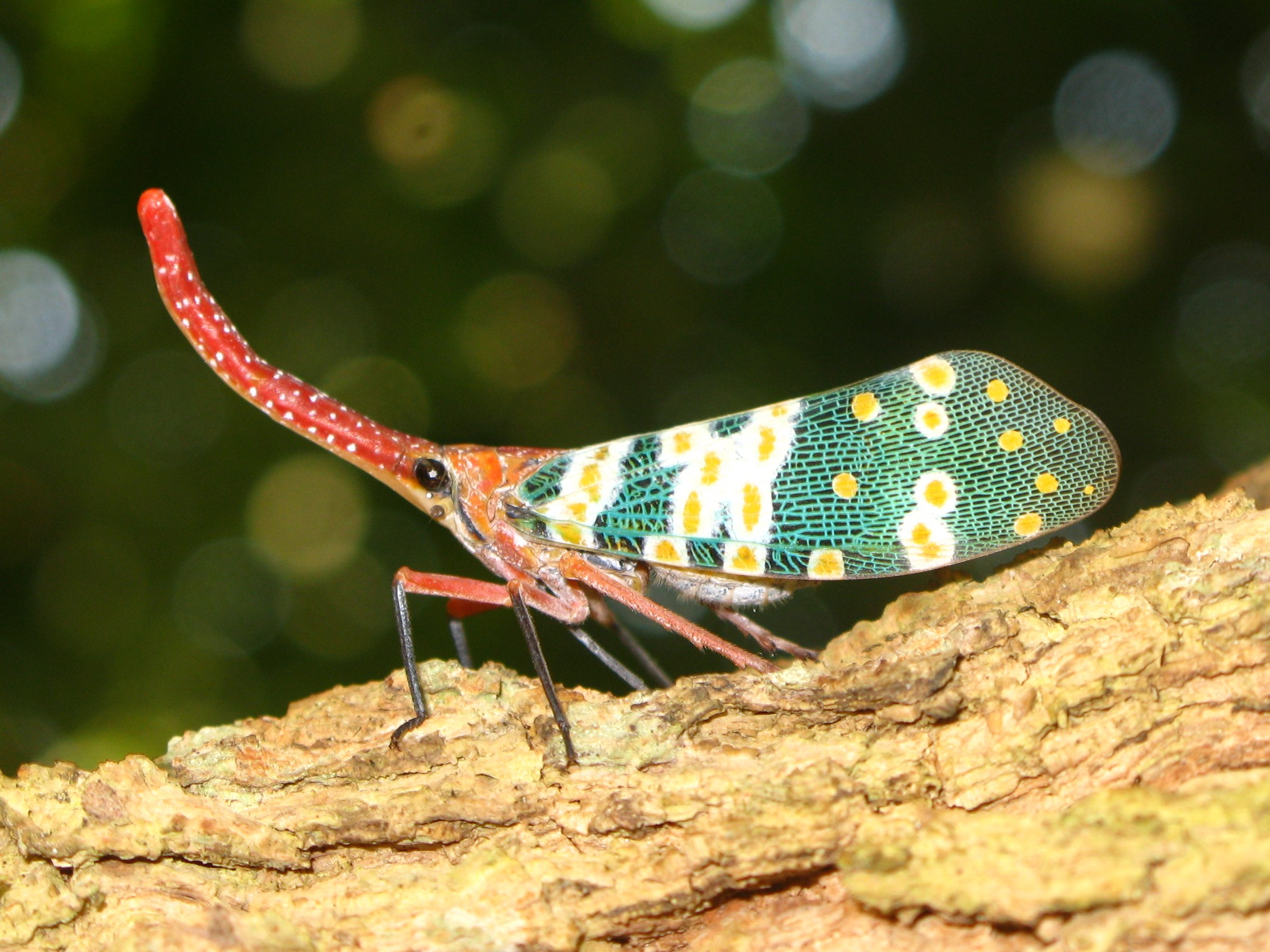
- Pyrops candelaria

Scientific classification
- Kingdom: Animalia
- Phylum: Arthropoda
- Clade: Pancrustacea
- Class: Insecta
- Order: Hemiptera
- Suborder: Auchenorrhyncha
- Infraorder: Fulgoromorpha
- Superfamily: Fulgoroidea
- Family: Fulgoridae
- Subfamily: Aphaeninae
- Tribe: Pyropsini
- Genus: Pyrops; Spinola, 1839

Type species
- Pyrops candelaria (Linnaeus, 1758)

Synonyms
- Laternaria Linnaeus, 1764 (Suppressed); Lanternaria Linnaeus, 1764 (Missp.); Byrops Spinola, 1839 (Missp.); Pyrophorus Spinola, 1839 (Missp.); Pyropi Spinola, 1839 (Missp.); Hotinus Amyot & Audinet-Serville, 1843; Hotina Amyot & Audinet-Serville, 1843 (Missp.); Hotini Amyot & Audinet-Serville, 1843 (Missp.)

= Pyrops =

Genus of planthoppers

Pyrops is a genus of planthoppers that occur primarily in southeast Asia, containing about 70 species. They are fairly large insects, with much of the length due to an elongated, upcurving, snout-like projection of the head. The wings are generally brightly patterned in contrasting colors, and they are popular among collectors.

== Species ==
The genus has been divided into several species groups:

=== Candelaria group ===
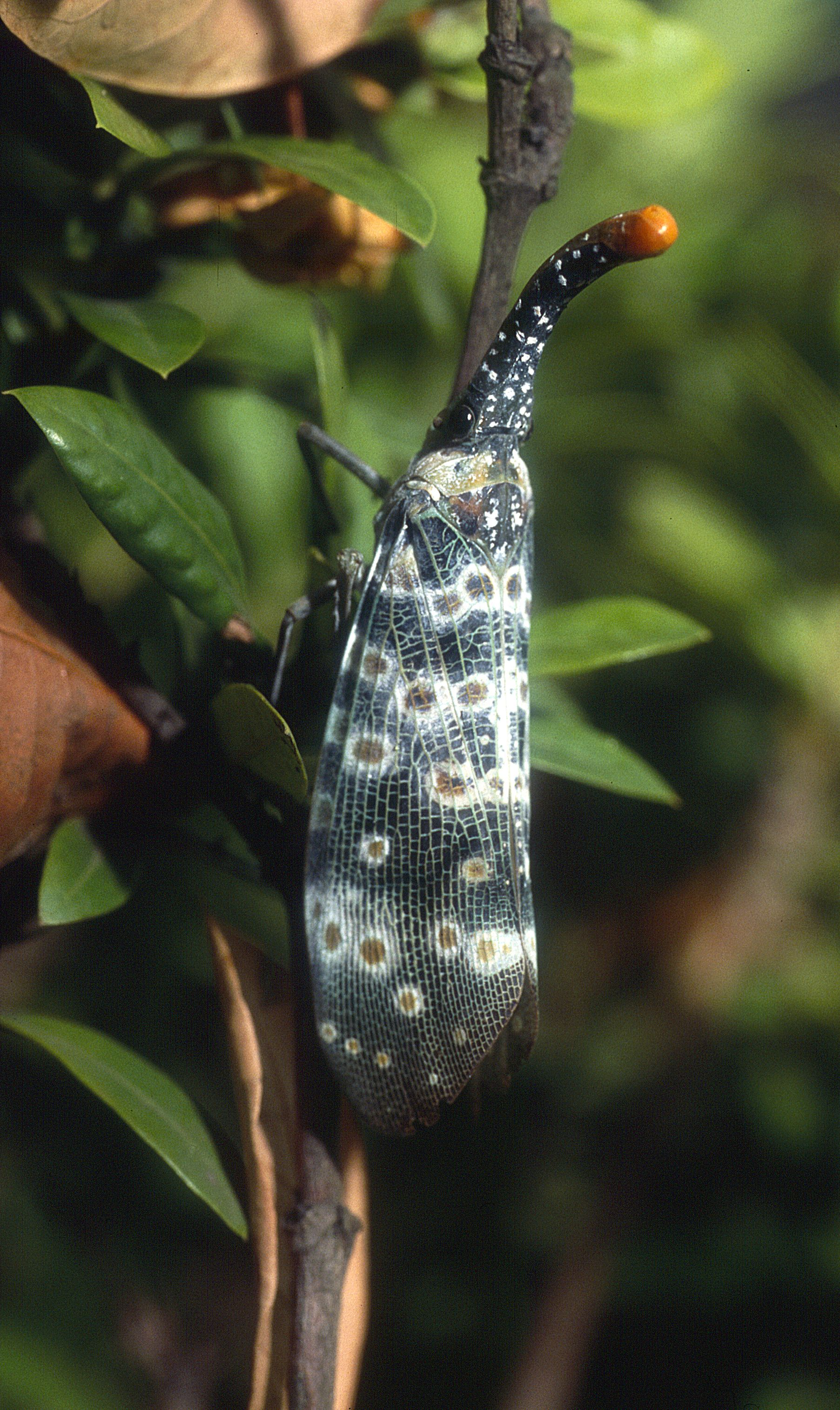
Pyrops lathburii

- Pyrops aeruginosus (Stål, 1870)
- Pyrops agusanensis (Baker, 1925)
- Pyrops auratus Constant, 2021
- Pyrops azureus Constant & Mohan, 2017
- Pyrops buomvoi Constant & Pham, 2022
- Pyrops candelaria (Linnaeus, 1758) – type species
- Pyrops coelestinus (Stål, 1863)
- Pyrops condorinus (Lallemand, 1960)
- Pyrops connectens (Atkinson, 1885)
- Pyrops curtiprora (Butler, 1874) - Actually a Saiva species.
- Pyrops delessertii (Guerin-Meneville, 1840)
- Pyrops dohrni (Schmidt, 1905)
- Pyrops ducalis Stål, 1863
- Pyrops exsanguis (Gerstaecker, 1895)
- Pyrops farinosus Bierman, 1910
- Pyrops fumosus (Baker, 1925)
- Pyrops heringi (Schmidt, 1905)
- Pyrops hobbyi (Lallemand, 1939)
- Pyrops jasmini Chew Kea Foo, Porion & Audibert, 2010
- Pyrops jianfenglingensis Wang, Xu & Qin, 2018
- Pyrops karenius (Distant, 1891)
- Pyrops kozlovi Porion & Audibert, 2020
- Pyrops lathburii (Kirby, 1818)
- Pyrops lautus (Stål, 1870)
- Pyrops maculatus (Olivier, 1791)
- Pyrops maquilinganus (Baker, 1925)
- Pyrops nishiyamai Nagai & Porion, 2002
- Pyrops ochraceus Nagai & Porion, 1996
- Pyrops peguensis (Schmidt, 1911)
- Pyrops philippinus (Stål, 1870)
- Pyrops polillensis (Baker, 1925)
- Pyrops priscilliae Nagai, Porion & Audibert, 2016
- Pyrops rogersi (Distant, 1906)
- Pyrops spinolae (Westwood, 1842)
- Pyrops viridirostris (Westwood, 1848)
- Pyrops vitalisius (Distant, 1918)
- Pyrops zephyrius (Schmidt, 1907)

=== "Cultellatus group" ===
- Pyrops cultellatus (Walker, 1857)
- Pyrops itoi (Satô & Nagai, 1994)

=== Clavatus group ===
- Pyrops atroalbus (Distant, 1918)
- Pyrops clavatus (Westwood, 1839)
- Pyrops watanabei (Matsumura, 1913)

=== Effusus group ===
- Pyrops effusus (Distant, 1891)
- Pyrops gunjii (Satô & Nagai, 1994)
- Pyrops synavei Constant, 2015
- Pyrops whiteheadi (Distant, 1889)

=== Oculatus group ===
- Pyrops alboroseus Liang, 1998
- Pyrops horsfieldii (Westwood, 1839)
- Pyrops nishiguroi Nagai, Porion & Audibert, 2017
- Pyrops oculatus (Westwood, 1839)
- Pyrops sidereus (Distant, 1905)

=== Polillensis group ===
- Pyrops polillensis (Baker, 1925)
- Pyrops samaranus (Baker, 1925)

=== Pyrorhynchus group ===
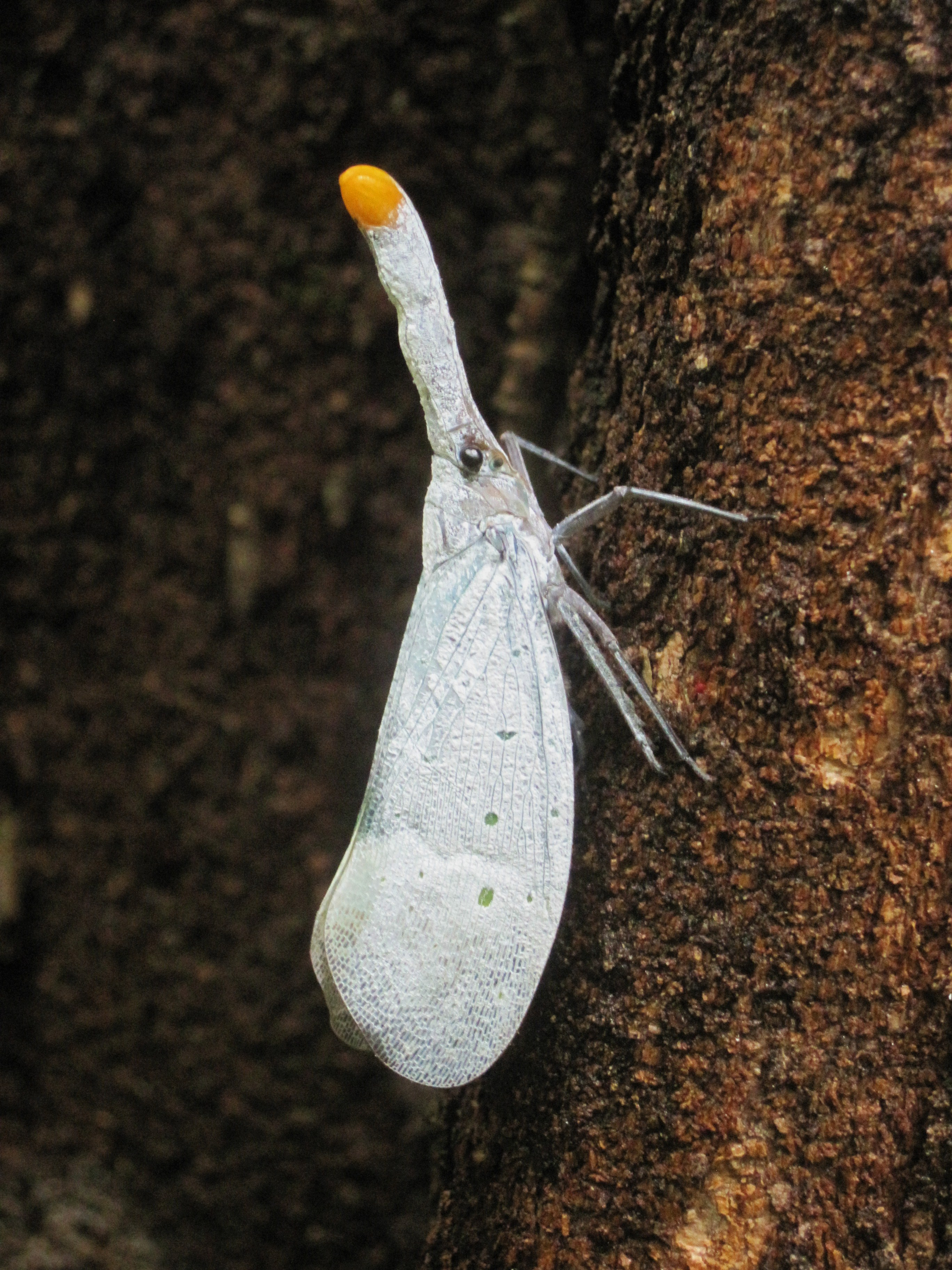
Pyrops ruehli

- Pyrops intricatus (Walker, 1857)
- Pyrops pyrorhynchus (Donovan, 1800)
- Pyrops pythicus (Distant, 1891)
- Pyrops ruehli Schmidt, 1926

=== Sultana group ===
- Pyrops erectus (Schmidt, 1905)
- Pyrops sultana (Adams, 1847)

=== Ungrouped species ===
- Pyrops cyanirostris (Guerin-Meneville, 1845)
- Pyrops detanii Nagai & Porion, 2004
- Pyrops dimotus (Lallemand, 1960)
- Pyrops hamdjahi Nagai & Porion, 2002
- Pyrops hashimotoi Nagai & Porion, 2002
- Pyrops ishiharai (Satô & Nagai, 1994)
- Pyrops jefferyi Nagai & Porion, 2002
- Pyrops valerian Nagai & Porion, 2002

== Taxonomy ==
The genus name of Laternaria has been used by some authors, but this name was published in a work that was suppressed in 1955 by an official declaration of the International Code of Zoological Nomenclature (ICZN): Opinion 322. The type species is Pyrops candelaria.

A molecular phylogenetic study suggests that Pyrops is sister to the genus Saiva, and the tribe Pyropsini may not be properly placed in Fulgorinae.

== Ecology ==
Like many other plant-sap sucking insects, Pyrops species exude honeydew. This honeydew is sometimes gathered by other animals in trophobiotic associations. Pyrops whiteheadi and P. intricatus are known to be attended by Dorylaea spp. cockroaches in Southeast Asia. Pyrops whiteheadi has also been seen tended by a gecko, Gehyra mutilata.
