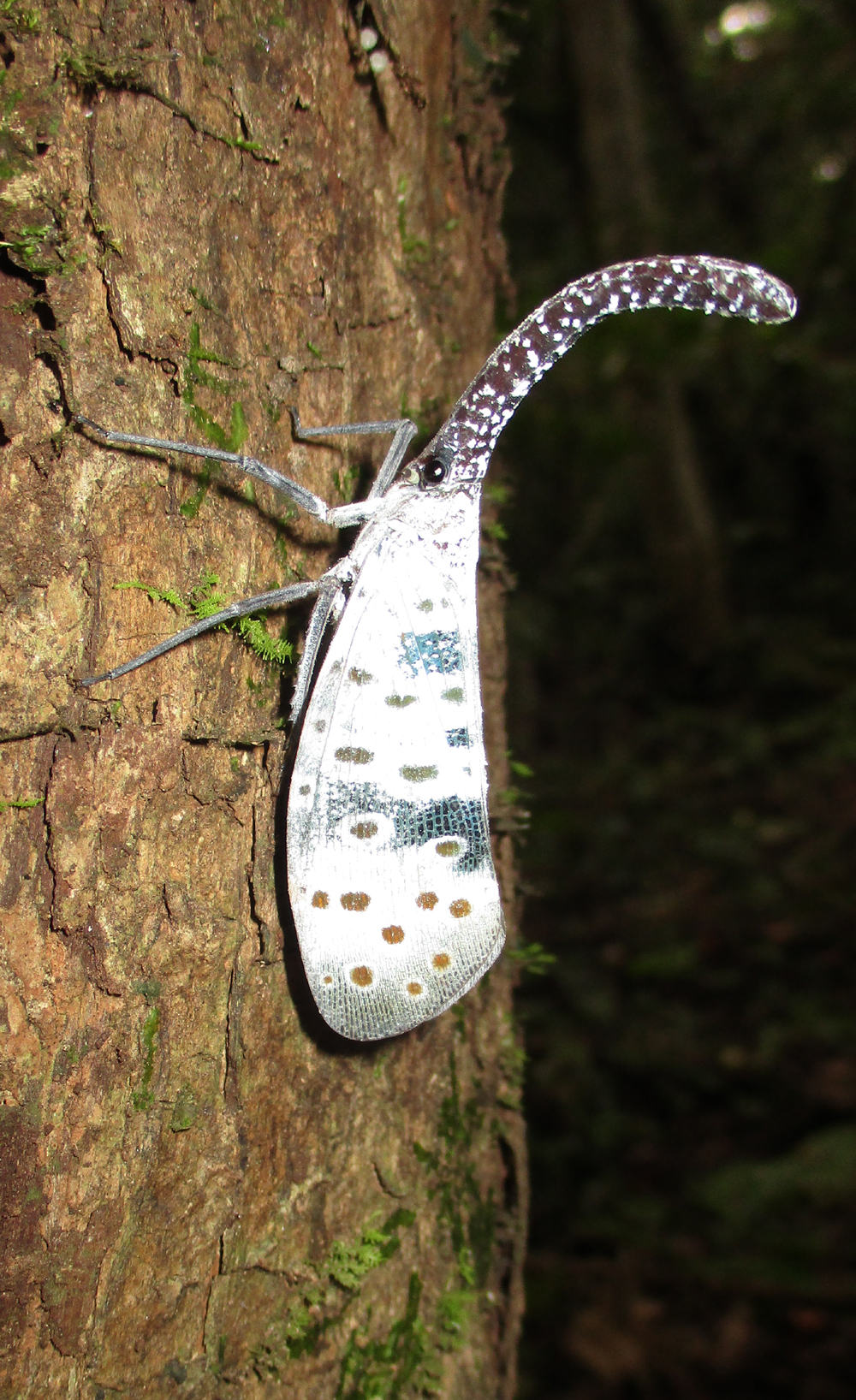
- Specimen in Cat Tien National Park

Scientific classification
- Kingdom: Animalia
- Phylum: Arthropoda
- Clade: Pancrustacea
- Class: Insecta
- Order: Hemiptera
- Suborder: Auchenorrhyncha
- Infraorder: Fulgoromorpha
- Family: Fulgoridae
- Genus: Pyrops
- Species: P. coelestinus

Binomial name
- Pyrops coelestinus (Stål, 1863)

Synonyms
- Fulgora caelestina Atkinson, 1886; Fulgora coelestina Butler, 1874; Hotinus coelestina Stål, 1863

= Pyrops coelestinus =

Species of planthopper

Pyrops coelestinus, previously known as Laternaria coelestina, is a species of planthopper belonging to a genus referred-to as lantern-bugs, sometimes known as the blue lantern bug (Vietnamese: ve sầu xanh).

== Distribution and description ==
This species is found in Indochina: both P. coelestinus and P. ducalis have type specimens from Cambodia, with relatively recent records for the insect fauna of Vietnam.

The head, and cephalic process are grey-black with numerous white spots (see figure) and the hind wings (not shown) are royal blue with a black zone around the wing tip.
