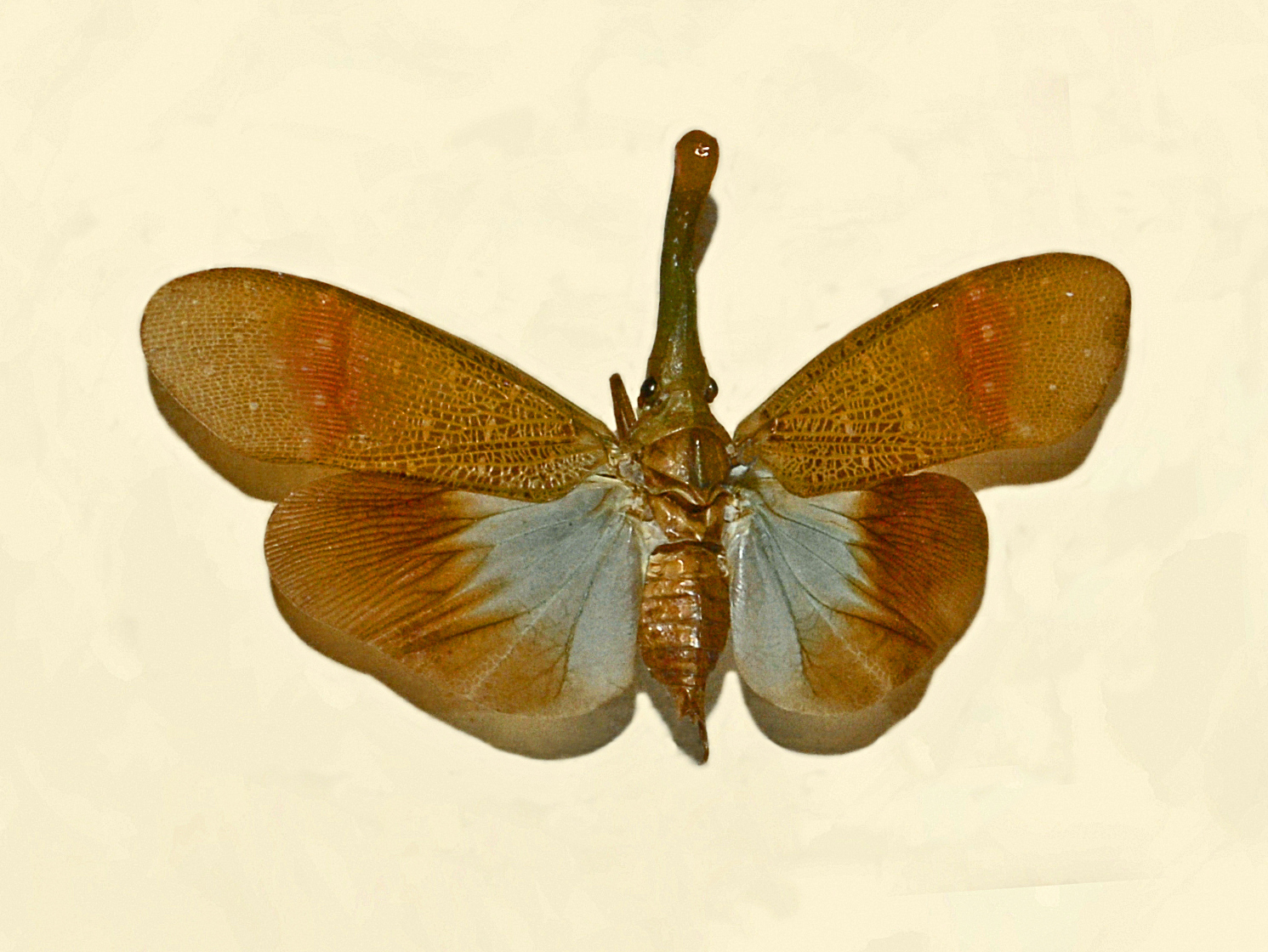
- Museum specimen from Sumatra

Scientific classification
- Kingdom: Animalia
- Phylum: Arthropoda
- Class: Insecta
- Order: Hemiptera
- Suborder: Auchenorrhyncha
- Infraorder: Fulgoromorpha
- Family: Fulgoridae
- Genus: Pyrops
- Species: P. pythicus

Binomial name
- Pyrops pythicus (Distant, 1891)

= Pyrops pythicus =

Species of true bug

Pyrops pythicus is a species of true bug in the family Fulgoridae, in the genus Pyrops which are sometimes called lanternflies.

== Subspecies ==
- Pyrops pythicus incertus Schmidt, 1923
- Pyrops pythicus pythicus (Distant, 1891)

== Description ==
Pyrops pythicus can reach a length of about 50–60 millimetres (2.0–2.4 in). These large true bugs show an elongated bluish "snout". The hindwings are bluish green, with a large transversal reddish area and small white spots.

== Distribution ==
This species can be found in Sumatra.
