= Centrotypini =

Scientific classification
- Kingdom: Animalia
- Phylum: Arthropoda
- Clade: Pancrustacea
- Class: Insecta
- Order: Hemiptera
- Suborder: Auchenorrhyncha
- Family: Membracidae
- Subfamily: Centrotinae
- Tribe: Centrotypini; Haupt, 1929

Tribe of true bugs

Centrotypini is a tribe of treehoppers in the subfamily Centrotinae. It was first described by Hermann Haupt in 1929, and contains 2 genera. The type genus of this tribe is Centrotypus

== Description ==
Individuals in this tribe are typically 6.5-7.5 millimeters in length and typically have black, metallic black, or metallic purple coloring.

== Taxonomy ==
Centrotypini was originally described in the subfamily Oxyrhachinae, now tribe Oxyrhachini. The tribe is closely related to the tribes Leptocentrini, Leptobelini, and Maarbarini. It is also the sister group of the tribe Micreunini. Genera previously included in this tribe are:

- Crito and Otinotoides, moved to Terentiini
- Peltzerella, moved to Leptocentrini
- Pogon, moved to Maarbarini

== Genera ==
The following genera are recognized:

- Centrotypus Stål, 1866
- Emphusis Buckton, 1903

== Distribution and habitat ==
Members of this taxon are widespread throughout the Australasian and Indomalayan regions.

== Ecology ==
Members of the tribe Beaufortianini have been observed on host plants in the families Anacardiaceae, Moraceae, Rhamnaceae, Rubiaceae, and Santalaceae.
