= Maarbarini =

Scientific classification
- Kingdom: Animalia
- Phylum: Arthropoda
- Clade: Pancrustacea
- Class: Insecta
- Order: Hemiptera
- Suborder: Auchenorrhyncha
- Family: Membracidae
- Subfamily: Centrotinae
- Tribe: Maarbarini; Wallace & Dietz, 2004

Tribe of true bugs

Maarbarini is a tribe of treehoppers in the subfamily Centrotinae. It was first described by Matthew Wallace and Lewis Dietz in 2004, and contains 8 genera. The type genus of this tribe is Maarbarus.

== Description ==
Individuals in this tribe are typically 3-5.5 millimeters in length and have black, tan, or dark brown coloring.

== Taxonomy ==
Maarbarini is monophyletic and is closely related to the tribes Choucentrini, Leptocentrini, Micreunini, Leptobelini, and Centrotypini. Prior to the formation of this tribe, the type genus Maarbarus was placed in the tribe Centrotini. The genera Bathoutha, Indicopleustes, Parapogon, Pogonotus, and Telingana were placed in Leptocentrini. The genus Telingana is only tentatively placed within Maarbarini as it differs in several morphological characteristics, perhaps most notably in its type species Telingana curvispinus.

== Genera ==
The following genera are recognized:

- Bathoutha Distant, 1908
- Indicopleustes Distant, 1908
- Maarbarus Distant, 1908
- Parapogon Distant, 1908
- Pogon Buckton, 1903
- Pogonotus Thirumalai & Ananthasubramanian, 1985
- Pogontypus Distant, 1907
- Telingana Distant, 1908

== Distribution and habitat ==
Members of this taxon are widespread throughout the Indomalayan and Palearctic regions. Almost all specimens have been collected from India and Sri Lanka.

== Ecology ==
Members of the tribe Maarbarini are reported from the host plant families Alliaceae, Caprifoliaceae, Cupressaceae, Dryopteridaceae, Fagaceae, Gramineae, Rosaceae, Santalaceae, and Solanaceae. Some species are reported to engage in myrmecophily.
