= Beaufortianini =

Scientific classification
- Kingdom: Animalia
- Phylum: Arthropoda
- Clade: Pancrustacea
- Class: Insecta
- Order: Hemiptera
- Suborder: Auchenorrhyncha
- Family: Membracidae
- Subfamily: Centrotinae
- Tribe: Beaufortianini; Wallace & Dietz, 2004

Tribe of true bugs

Beaufortianini is a tribe of treehoppers in the subfamily Centrotinae. It was first described by Matthew Wallace and Lewis Dietz in 2004, and contains 8 genera. The type genus of this tribe is Beaufortiana

== Description ==
Individuals in this tribe are typically 4.8-7.6 millimeters in length and have black, tan, or dark brown coloring.

== Taxonomy ==
Beaufortiani is monophyletic. The tribe is related to the new-world tribes of Pieltainellini, Platycentrini, and Nessorhinini. Prior to the formation of this tribe, five of its genera were placed in the tribe Leptocentrini and two genera, Centrotusoides and Maguva, were placed in the tribe Centrotini.

== Genera ==
The following genera are recognized:

- Beaufortiana Distant, 1916
- Centrolobus Capener, 1968
- Centrotusoides Distant, 1916
- Centruchus Stål, 1866
- Dukeobelus Capener, 1952
- Imporcitor Distant, 1916
- Mabokiana Boulard, 1976
- Maguva Melichar, 1903

== Distribution and habitat ==
Members of this taxon are widespread throughout the Afrotropical, Australasian, Indomalayan, and Palearctic regions.

== Ecology ==
Members of the tribe Beaufortianini have been observed on host plants in the families Fabaceae, Proteaceae, and Solanaceae. The genus Dukeobelus is reported to engage in myrmecophily.
