= Boocerini =

Scientific classification
- Kingdom: Animalia
- Phylum: Arthropoda
- Clade: Pancrustacea
- Class: Insecta
- Order: Hemiptera
- Suborder: Auchenorrhyncha
- Family: Membracidae
- Subfamily: Centrotinae
- Tribe: Boocerini; Goding, 1892

Tribe of true bugs

Boocerini is a tribe of treehoppers in the subfamily Centrotinae. It was first described by Frederic Webster Goding in 1892, and contains 9 genera. The type genus of this tribe is Boocerus

== Description ==
Individuals in this tribe are typically 2-7 millimeters in length and have black, dark brown, or tan coloring.

== Taxonomy ==
Boocerini is paraphyletic and is considered a synonym of the tribe Abelini. Two genera, Brachycentrotus and Daimon, were previously included in this tribe but transferred to the tribes of Monobelini and Nessorhinini, respectively.

== Genera ==
The following genera are recognized:

- Abelus Stål, 1870
- Amblycentrus Fowler, 1896
- Boocerus Stål, 1869
- Brachybelus Stål, 1869
- Campylocentrus Stål, 1870
- Centriculus Fowler, 1896
- Ischnocentrus Stål, 1870
- Ophicentrus Fowler, 1896
- Psilocentrus Fowler, 1896

== Distribution and habitat ==
Members of this taxon are widespread throughout the neotropics, with many occurrences in Mexico, South and Central America.

== Ecology ==
Members of the tribe Boocerini have been observed on many families of host plants, including Anacardiaceae, Asclepiadaceae, and Convolvulacea. Members of the genus Ischnocentrus are reported to engage in myrmecophily.
