= Negus asper =

Scientific classification
- Kingdom: Animalia
- Phylum: Arthropoda
- Clade: Pancrustacea
- Class: Insecta
- Order: Hemiptera
- Suborder: Auchenorrhyncha
- Family: Membracidae
- Genus: Negus
- Species: N. asper

Binomial name
- Negus asper Jacobi, 1910

Species of insect

Negus asper is a species of treehoppers in the subfamily Centrotinae described by Arnold Jacobi in 1910. It has been found in Tanzania, Guinea, and Equatorial Guinea.
