= Negus (treehopper) =

Scientific classification
- Kingdom: Animalia
- Phylum: Arthropoda
- Clade: Pancrustacea
- Class: Insecta
- Order: Hemiptera
- Suborder: Auchenorrhyncha
- Family: Membracidae
- Subfamily: Centrotinae
- Tribe: Xiphopoeini
- Genus: Negus; Jacobi, 1910

Type species
- Negus asper Jacobi, 1910

Genus of insects

Negus is a genus of treehoppers in the subfamily Centrotinae. It was first described by Arnold Jacobi in 1910. Species within this genus are widespread throughout Sub-Saharan Africa, including the countries of Democratic Republic of the Congo, Tanzania, and South Africa.

== Species ==
The following species are recognized:

- Negus asper Jacobi, 1910
- Negus newtoni Capener, 1972
- Negus ornatus Buckton, 1903
- Negus tristis Buckton, 1903
- Negus truncaticornis Capener, 1972
