= Anchon erici =

Scientific classification
- Kingdom: Animalia
- Phylum: Arthropoda
- Clade: Pancrustacea
- Class: Insecta
- Order: Hemiptera
- Suborder: Auchenorrhyncha
- Family: Membracidae
- Genus: Anchon
- Species: A. erici

Binomial name
- Anchon erici Boulard, 1969

Species of insect

Anchon erici is a species of treehoppers in the subfamily Centrotinae described by Michel Boulard in 1969. It is found in Central African Republic.
