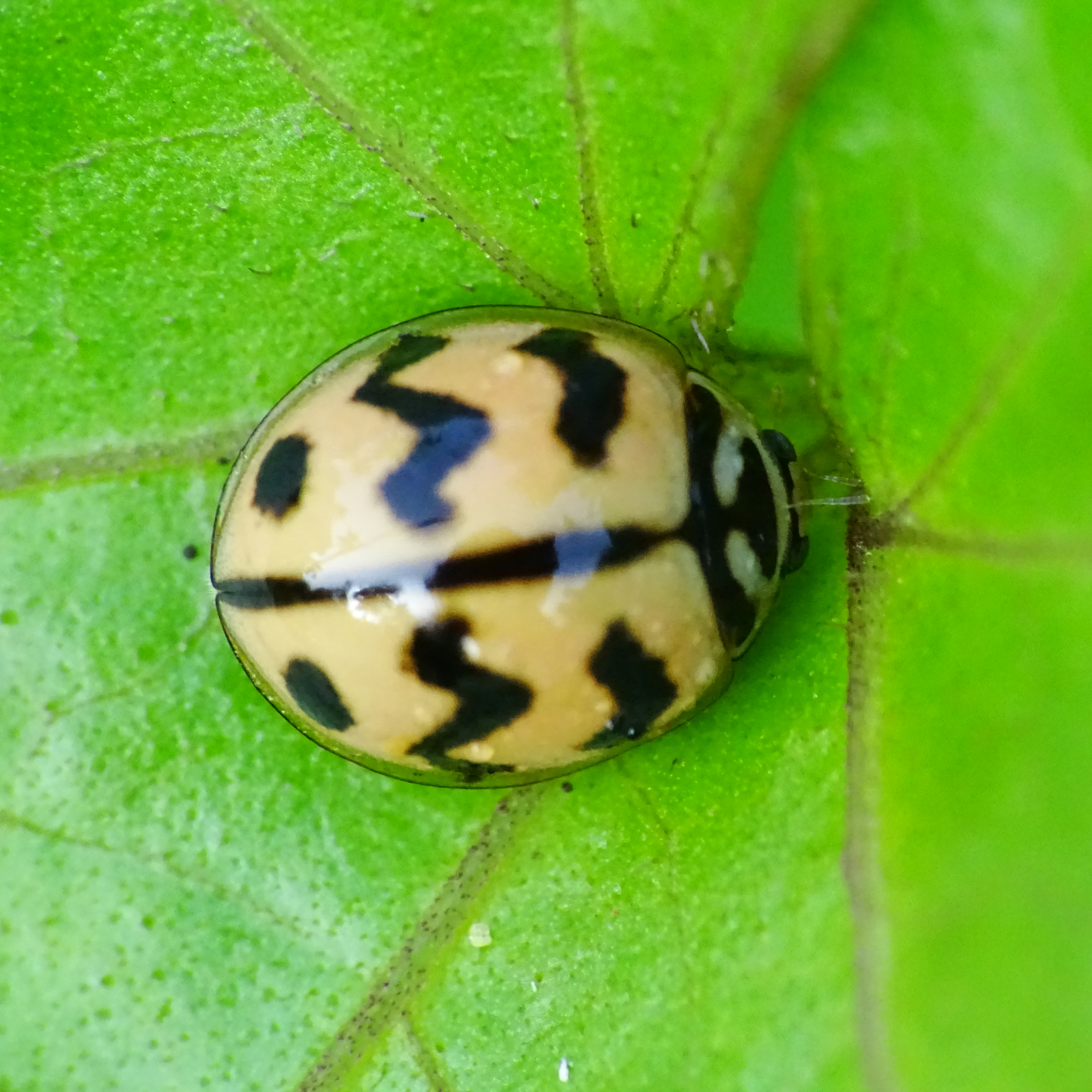

Scientific classification
- Kingdom: Animalia
- Phylum: Arthropoda
- Clade: Pancrustacea
- Class: Insecta
- Order: Coleoptera
- Suborder: Polyphaga
- Infraorder: Cucujiformia
- Family: Coccinellidae
- Genus: Cheilomenes
- Species: C. sexmaculata

Binomial name
- Cheilomenes sexmaculata Fabricius, 1781

Synonyms
- Coccinella sexmaculata Fabricius, 1781; Coccinella flexuosa Thunberg, 1781; Coccinella undulata Schaller, 1783; Coccinella interrupta Fabricius, 1792; Coccinella bifasciata Herbst, 1793; Coccinella quadriplagiata Swartz in Schönherr, 1808; Orcus mollipes Olliff, 1895; Cheilomenes hiugaensis Takizawa, 1917; Menochilus tuljapurensis Sathe & Bhosale, 2002; Menochilus shivajensis Sathe & Bhosale, 2002; Menochilus kharipi Sathe & Bhosale, 2002

= Cheilomenes sexmaculata =

Species of beetle

Cheilomenes sexmaculata is a species of ladybird. Although sometimes known by the common name of six-spotted zigzag ladybird, this is misleading as there are several colour morphs and some colour morphs of the species can be confused with Micraspis discolor and Chilocorus nigrita. The species has a wide distribution range within the Asian tropics and subtropical zones from India to Japan and parts of the Australian region. They have been introduced into the Caribbean islands as a biocontrol agent and their spread to South America was noted in 2019. It is well known as a predator of aphids and other small insects.

== Description ==
This species is about 3 to 4 mm in body length.

== Biology ==
It is a voracious predator on several whiteflies and aphids such as Aphis gossypii, Myzus persicae, Aphis craccivora, Amrasca, Empoasca and Leptocentrus. In addition to them, it feeds on a wide prey range including, scale insects, and diaspids.

== Genetics ==
The elytral colour has been identified as being controlled by two genes with two alleles each U-u and D-d and the phenotypes have been grouped into varieties quadriplagiata (“Q”) [UUDD,UUDd,UuDD,UuDd]; unifasciata (“U”) [Uudd,UUdd]; diversijunata (“D”) [uuDD,uuDd] and sexmaculata (“S”) [uudd]. The darker forms predominate in higher latitudes where absorption of heat may aid their survival.

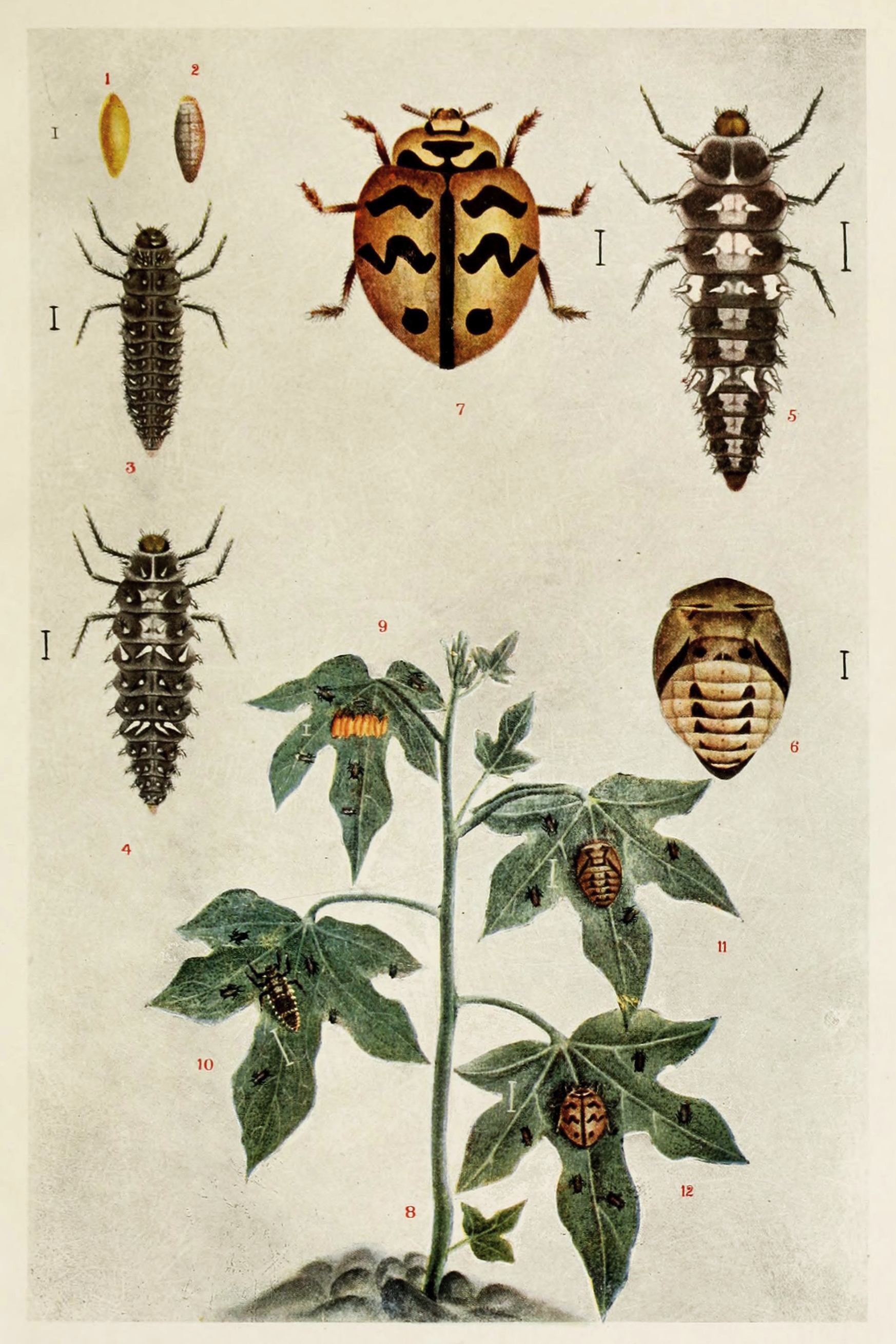
Life cycle

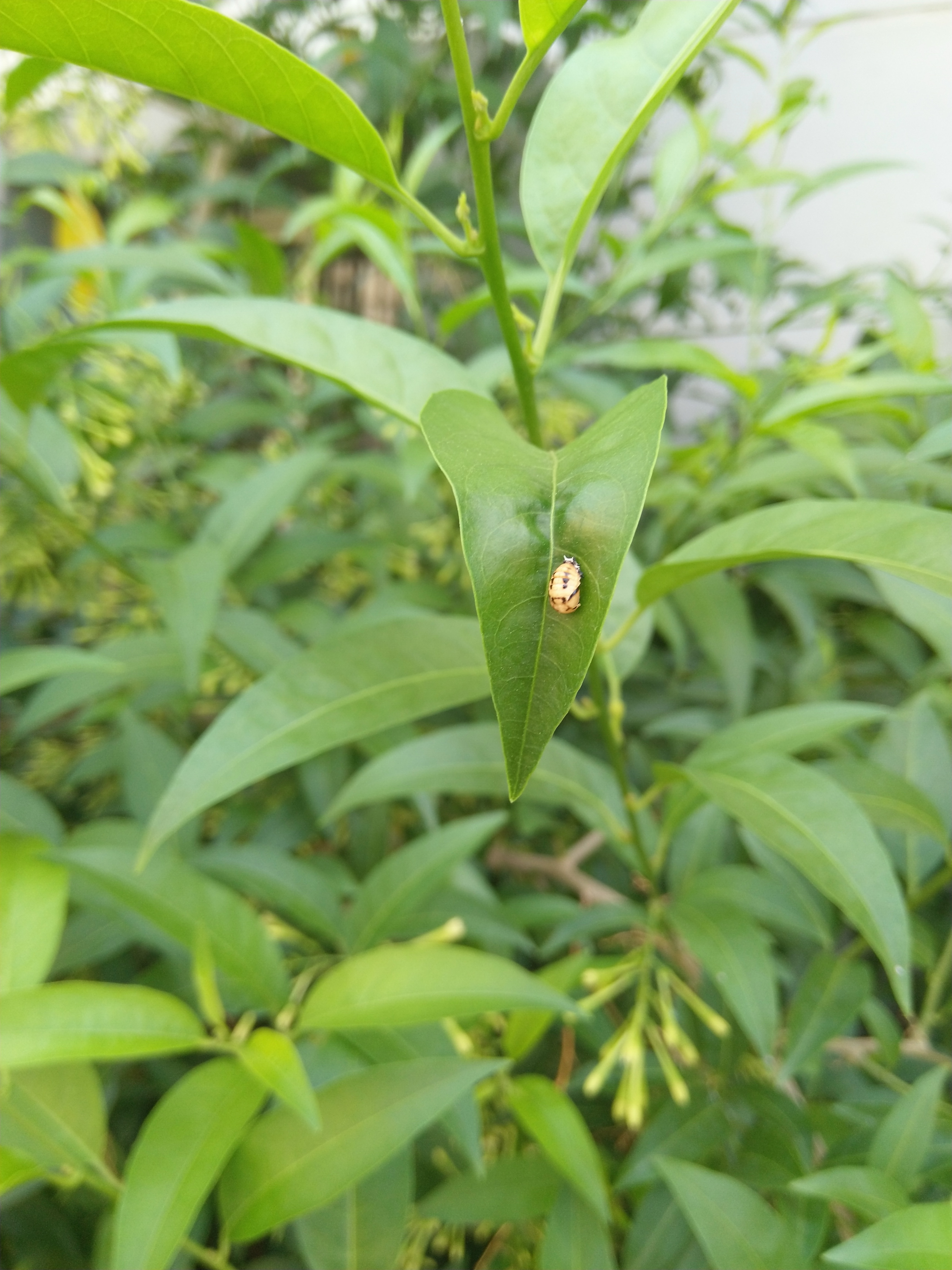
Pupa of Cheilomenes sexmaculata
