= Anchon brunneum =

Scientific classification
- Kingdom: Animalia
- Phylum: Arthropoda
- Clade: Pancrustacea
- Class: Insecta
- Order: Hemiptera
- Suborder: Auchenorrhyncha
- Family: Membracidae
- Genus: Anchon
- Species: A. brunneum

Binomial name
- Anchon brunneum Funkhouser, 1937

Synonyms
- Anchon brunneus

Species of insect

Anchon brunneum is a species of treehoppers in the subfamily Centrotinae described by William Delbert Funkhouser in 1937. It is found in China.
