= Xiphopoeus =

Scientific classification
- Kingdom: Animalia
- Phylum: Arthropoda
- Clade: Pancrustacea
- Class: Insecta
- Order: Hemiptera
- Suborder: Auchenorrhyncha
- Family: Membracidae
- Subfamily: Centrotinae
- Tribe: Xiphopoeini
- Genus: Xiphopoeus; Stål, 1866

Type species
- Xiphopoeus phantasma Signoret, 1858

Synonyms
- Kleidos Buckton, 1903; Xiphopaeus Stål, 1866

Genus of insects

Xiphopoeus is a genus of treehoppers in the subfamily Centrotinae. It was first described by Carl Stål in 1866. Species within this genus are widespread throughout coutries in Sub-Saharan Africa, including Democratic Republic of the Congo, Tanzania, and South Africa.

== Species ==
The following species are recognized:

- Xiphopoeus erectus Distant, 1916
- Xiphopoeus horridulus Walker, 1851
- Xiphopoeus palmatus Buckton, 1905
- Xiphopoeus phantasma Signoret, 1858
- Xiphopoeus validicornis Stål, 1855
- Xiphopoeus vomeris Buckton, 1903
