= Amphilobocentrus =

Scientific classification
- Kingdom: Animalia
- Phylum: Arthropoda
- Clade: Pancrustacea
- Class: Insecta
- Order: Hemiptera
- Suborder: Auchenorrhyncha
- Family: Membracidae
- Subfamily: Centrotinae
- Tribe: Lobocentrini
- Genus: Amphilobocentrus; Chou & Yuan, 1982
- Species: A. bifasciatus

Binomial name
- Amphilobocentrus bifasciatus Chou & Yuan, 1982

Genus of true bugs

Amphilobocentrus is a genus of treehoppers in the tribe Lobocentrini. This genus has a single species, Amphilobocentrus bifasciatus.
