= Anchon dirce =

Scientific classification
- Kingdom: Animalia
- Phylum: Arthropoda
- Clade: Pancrustacea
- Class: Insecta
- Order: Hemiptera
- Suborder: Auchenorrhyncha
- Family: Membracidae
- Genus: Anchon
- Species: A. dirce

Binomial name
- Anchon dirce Buckton, 1903

Species of insect

Anchon dirce is a species of treehoppers in the subfamily Centrotinae described by G.B. Buckton in 1903. It is found in China, Taiwan, and Sri Lanka.
