= Xiphopoeus erectus =

Scientific classification
- Kingdom: Animalia
- Phylum: Arthropoda
- Clade: Pancrustacea
- Class: Insecta
- Order: Hemiptera
- Suborder: Auchenorrhyncha
- Family: Membracidae
- Genus: Xiphopoeus
- Species: X. erectus

Binomial name
- Xiphopoeus erectus Distant, 1916

Species of insect

Xiphopoeus erectus is a species of treehoppers in the subfamily Centrotinae described by William Lucas Distant in 1916. It is found in Sub-Saharan Africa, including Uganda, Zambia, and South Africa.
