= Anchon dukei =

Scientific classification
- Kingdom: Animalia
- Phylum: Arthropoda
- Clade: Pancrustacea
- Class: Insecta
- Order: Hemiptera
- Suborder: Auchenorrhyncha
- Family: Membracidae
- Genus: Anchon
- Species: A. dukei

Binomial name
- Anchon dukei Capener, 1972

Species of insect

Anchon dukei is a species of treehoppers in the subfamily Centrotinae described by Alfred Lawrence Capener in 1972. It is found in South Africa and derives its name from Arthur Duke, who discovered the species and collected the initial specimens that Capener used to make his formal description.

== Description ==
Individuals of Anchon Dukei are considered very close in appearance to those of Anchon Nodicornis, but with slight variations in the length of their horns, setae, and wing coloring. Males are primarily black in color and are between 5.2 and 5.8 millimeters in length. Females have similar coloring and are slightly larger, ranging from 5.9 to 6.9 millimeters in length.

== Ecology ==
Specimens of Anchon Dukei have been collected from host blackberry plants in the genus Rubus.
