= Telingana =

- Telingana consobrina

Scientific classification
- Kingdom: Animalia
- Phylum: Arthropoda
- Clade: Pancrustacea
- Class: Insecta
- Order: Hemiptera
- Suborder: Auchenorrhyncha
- Family: Membracidae
- Subfamily: Centrotinae
- Genus: Telingana; Distant, 1908

Genus of true bugs

Telingana is a genus of treehoppers in the tribe Maarbarini described by William Lucas Distant in 1908. Members of this tribe are found in Asia. They lay solitary eggs and the young do not aggregate as in some membracids.

== Species ==
- Telingana balteata Distant, 1916
- Telingana campbelli Distant, 1916
- Telingana canescens Buckton, 1903
- Telingana capistrata Distant, 1908
- Telingana cognata Distant, 1916
- Telingana consobrina Distant, 1916
- Telingana curvispinus Stål, 1869 (genus type)
- Telingana decipiens Kirby, W.F., 1891
- Telingana depressa Funkhouser, 1935
- Telingana flavipes Kirby, W.F., 1891
- Telingana formosanus Matsumura, 1912
- Telingana imitator Kirby, W.F., 1891
- Telingana maculoptera Yuan, 2002
- Telingana majuscula Thirumalai & Ananthasubramanian, 1981
- Telingana nigroalata Ananthasubramanian & Ananthakrishnan, 1975
- Telingana ornanda Distant, 1916
- Telingana paria Fairmaire, 1846
- Telingana pulniensis Ananthasubramanian, 1980
- Telingana recurvata Distant, 1916
- Telingana sabarigiriensis Thirumalai & Ananthasubramanian, 1985
- Telingana scutellata China, 1925
- Telingana subsimilis Walker, 1857
- Telingana travancorensis Distant, 1916
- Telingana varipes Walker, 1857
