= Xiphopoeus vomeris =

Scientific classification
- Kingdom: Animalia
- Phylum: Arthropoda
- Clade: Pancrustacea
- Class: Insecta
- Order: Hemiptera
- Suborder: Auchenorrhyncha
- Family: Membracidae
- Genus: Xiphopoeus
- Species: X. vomeris

Binomial name
- Xiphopoeus vomeris Buckton, 1903

Synonyms
- Kleidos vomeratus Buckton, 1903

Species of insect

Xiphopoeus vomeris is a species of treehoppers in the subfamily Centrotinae described by George Bowdler Buckton in 1903. It is found in Sub-Saharan Africa, including in Nigeria, Tanzania, and Uganda.
