= Xiphopoeus palmatus =

Scientific classification
- Kingdom: Animalia
- Phylum: Arthropoda
- Clade: Pancrustacea
- Class: Insecta
- Order: Hemiptera
- Suborder: Auchenorrhyncha
- Family: Membracidae
- Genus: Xiphopoeus
- Species: X. palmatus

Binomial name
- Xiphopoeus palmatus Buckton, 1905

Synonyms
- Xiphopoeus vomeris Melichar, 1905

Species of insect

Xiphopoeus palmatus is a species of treehoppers in the subfamily Centrotinae described by George Bowdler Buckton in 1905. It is found in Tanzania.
