= Xiphopoeus validicornis =

Scientific classification
- Kingdom: Animalia
- Phylum: Arthropoda
- Clade: Pancrustacea
- Class: Insecta
- Order: Hemiptera
- Suborder: Auchenorrhyncha
- Family: Membracidae
- Genus: Xiphopoeus
- Species: X. validicornis

Binomial name
- Xiphopoeus validicornis Stål, 1855

Species of insect

Xiphopoeus validicornis is a species of treehoppers in the subfamily Centrotinae described by Carl Stål in 1855. It is found in South Africa.
