= Anchon gunni =

Scientific classification
- Kingdom: Animalia
- Phylum: Arthropoda
- Clade: Pancrustacea
- Class: Insecta
- Order: Hemiptera
- Suborder: Auchenorrhyncha
- Family: Membracidae
- Genus: Anchon
- Species: A. gunni

Binomial name
- Anchon gunni Funkhouser, 1919

Species of insect

Anchon gunni is a species of treehoppers in the subfamily Centrotinae described by William Delbert Funkhouser in 1919. It is found in South Africa.

== Description ==
Individuals of this species are described as being very close in appearance to Anchon nodicornus but differing slightly in morphology and coloring. Males of this species are primarily black in color and typically measure between 6.6 and 7 millimeters in length. Females have similar coloring, but are slightly larger at 7.5 to 8.1 millimeters in length.

== Ecology ==
Anchon gunni has been collected from the host plant Clematis brachiata.
