= Anchon bilineatus =

Scientific classification
- Kingdom: Animalia
- Phylum: Arthropoda
- Clade: Pancrustacea
- Class: Insecta
- Order: Hemiptera
- Suborder: Auchenorrhyncha
- Family: Membracidae
- Genus: Anchon
- Species: A. bilineatus

Binomial name
- Anchon bilineatus Stål, 1855

Species of insect

Anchon bilineatus is a species of treehoppers in the subfamily Centrotinae described by Carl Stål in 1855. It is found in South Africa.
