= Anchon brevis =

Scientific classification
- Kingdom: Animalia
- Phylum: Arthropoda
- Clade: Pancrustacea
- Class: Insecta
- Order: Hemiptera
- Suborder: Auchenorrhyncha
- Family: Membracidae
- Genus: Anchon
- Species: A. brevis

Binomial name
- Anchon brevis Distant, 1908

Species of insect

Anchon brevis is a species of treehoppers in the subfamily Centrotinae described by William Lucas Distant in 1908. It is found in Sri Lanka.
