= Boccharini =

Scientific classification
- Kingdom: Animalia
- Phylum: Arthropoda
- Clade: Pancrustacea
- Class: Insecta
- Order: Hemiptera
- Suborder: Auchenorrhyncha
- Family: Membracidae
- Subfamily: Centrotinae
- Tribe: Boccharini; Wallace & Dietz, 2004

Tribe of true bugs

Boccharini is a tribe of treehoppers in the subfamily Centrotinae. It was first described by Matthew Wallace and Lewis Dietz in 2004, and contains 2 genera. The type genus of this tribe is Bocchar

== Description ==
Individuals in this tribe are typically 6-6.7 millimeters in length and have black or reddish-brown, often shiny coloring.

== Taxonomy ==
Boccharini is monophyletic and appears to be closely related to the tribe Lobocentrini. Prior to the formation of this tribe, both of its genera were placed in the tribe Leptocentrini.

== Genera ==
The following genera are recognized:

- Bocchar Jacobi, 1910
- Lanceonotus Capener, 1968

== Distribution and habitat ==
Members of this taxon are widespread throughout the Afrotropical and Indomalayan regions.

== Ecology ==
Members of the tribe Boccharini have been observed on host plants in the Lauraceae family.
