= Xiphopoeus phantasma =

Scientific classification
- Kingdom: Animalia
- Phylum: Arthropoda
- Clade: Pancrustacea
- Class: Insecta
- Order: Hemiptera
- Suborder: Auchenorrhyncha
- Family: Membracidae
- Genus: Xiphopoeus
- Species: X. phantasma

Binomial name
- Xiphopoeus phantasma Signoret, 1858

Synonyms
- Centrotus phantasma Signoret, 1858

Species of insect

Xiphopoeus phantasma is a species of treehoppers in the subfamily Centrotinae described by Victor Antoine Signoret in 1858. It is found in Sub-Saharan Africa, including in Nigeria and Democratic Republic of the Congo.
