= Anchon boneti =

Scientific classification
- Kingdom: Animalia
- Phylum: Arthropoda
- Clade: Pancrustacea
- Class: Insecta
- Order: Hemiptera
- Suborder: Auchenorrhyncha
- Family: Membracidae
- Genus: Anchon
- Species: A. boneti

Binomial name
- Anchon boneti Peláez, 1935

Species of insect

Anchon boneti is a species of treehoppers in the subfamily Centrotinae described by Dionisio Peláez in 1935. It is found in Democratic Republic of the Congo.
