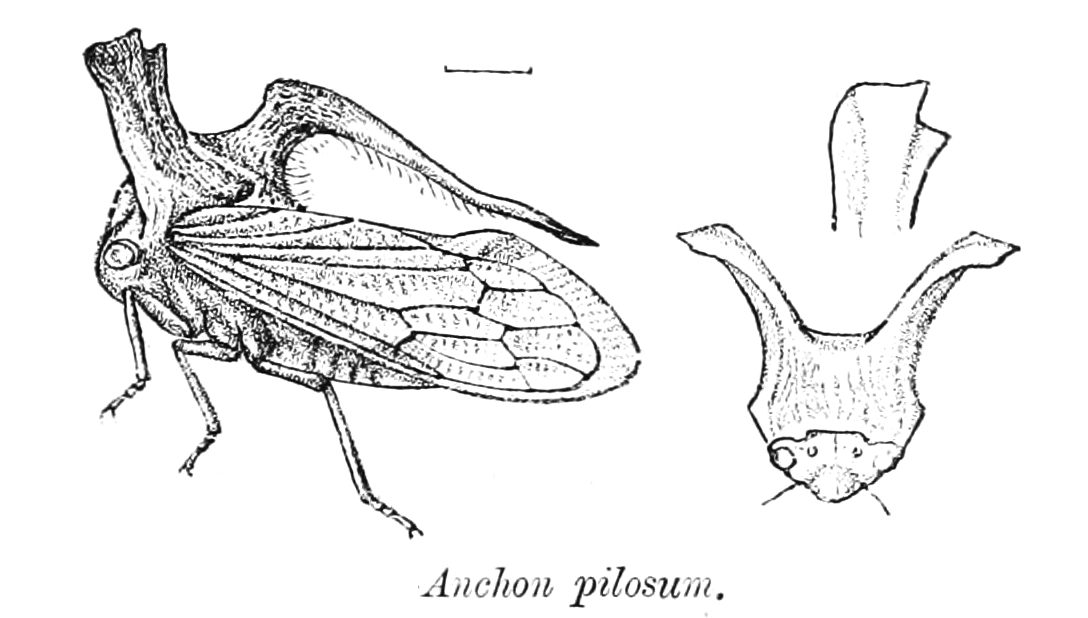

Scientific classification
- Kingdom: Animalia
- Phylum: Arthropoda
- Clade: Pancrustacea
- Class: Insecta
- Order: Hemiptera
- Suborder: Auchenorrhyncha
- Family: Membracidae
- Genus: Anchon
- Species: A. pilosum

Binomial name
- Anchon pilosum (Walker, 1851)

Synonyms
- Centrotus pilosus Walker, 1851; Platybelus pilosus (Walker, 1851); Xiphopoeus pilosus (Walker, 1851); Centrotus pilosus Billberg, 1820

= Anchon pilosum =

Species of insect

Anchon pilosum is a species of treehoppers in the subfamily Centrotinae described by Francis Walker in 1851. It is found in India, Sri Lanka, Vietnam, and Taiwan.
