= Negus newtoni =

Scientific classification
- Kingdom: Animalia
- Phylum: Arthropoda
- Clade: Pancrustacea
- Class: Insecta
- Order: Hemiptera
- Suborder: Auchenorrhyncha
- Family: Membracidae
- Genus: Negus
- Species: N. newtoni

Binomial name
- Negus newtoni Capener, 1972

Species of insect

Negus newtoni is a species of treehoppers in the subfamily Centrotinae described by Alfred Lawrence Capener in 1972. It is found in South Africa.
