= Anchon decoratum =

Scientific classification
- Kingdom: Animalia
- Phylum: Arthropoda
- Clade: Pancrustacea
- Class: Insecta
- Order: Hemiptera
- Suborder: Auchenorrhyncha
- Family: Membracidae
- Genus: Anchon
- Species: A. decoratum

Binomial name
- Anchon decoratum Distant, 1914

Synonyms
- Anchon decoratus

Species of insect

Anchon decoratum is a species of treehoppers in the subfamily Centrotinae described by William Lucas Distant in 1914. It is found in Nigeria.
