= Anchon agnatum =

Scientific classification
- Kingdom: Animalia
- Phylum: Arthropoda
- Clade: Pancrustacea
- Class: Insecta
- Order: Hemiptera
- Suborder: Auchenorrhyncha
- Family: Membracidae
- Genus: Anchon
- Species: A. agnatum

Binomial name
- Anchon agnatum Capener, 1972

Species of insect

Anchon agnatum is a species of treehoppers in the subfamily Centrotinae described by Alfred Lawrence Capener in 1972. It is found in South Africa.

== Description ==
Individuals of Anchon agnatum are described as being very similar in appearance to Anchon rusticanum, but slightly larger in size and with different protrusions on the rear of the insect's body. Males are primarily dark brown in color and measure between 5.3 and 5.5 millimeters in length. Females have slightly lighter coloring and are slightly larger at 6.6 to 7 millimeters in length.
