= Anchon brevicornis =

Scientific classification
- Kingdom: Animalia
- Phylum: Arthropoda
- Clade: Pancrustacea
- Class: Insecta
- Order: Hemiptera
- Suborder: Auchenorrhyncha
- Family: Membracidae
- Genus: Anchon
- Species: A. brevicornis

Binomial name
- Anchon brevicornis Chou, 1980

Species of insect

Anchon brevicornis is a species of treehoppers in the subfamily Centrotinae described by Io Chou in 1980. It is found in China.
