= Anchon echinatum =

Scientific classification
- Kingdom: Animalia
- Phylum: Arthropoda
- Clade: Pancrustacea
- Class: Insecta
- Order: Hemiptera
- Suborder: Auchenorrhyncha
- Family: Membracidae
- Genus: Anchon
- Species: A. echinatum

Binomial name
- Anchon echinatum Distant, 1908

Synonyms
- Anchon echinatus

Species of insect

Anchon echinatum is a species of treehoppers in the subfamily Centrotinae described by William Lucas Distant in 1908. It is found in India and Myanmar.
