= Xiphopoeus horridulus =

Scientific classification
- Kingdom: Animalia
- Phylum: Arthropoda
- Clade: Pancrustacea
- Class: Insecta
- Order: Hemiptera
- Suborder: Auchenorrhyncha
- Family: Membracidae
- Genus: Xiphopoeus
- Species: X. horridulus

Binomial name
- Xiphopoeus horridulus Walker, 1851

Synonyms
- Centrotus horridulus Walker, 1851

Species of insect

Xiphopoeus horridulus is a species of treehoppers in the subfamily Centrotinae described by Francis Walker in 1851. It is found in South Africa and Zambia.
