= Negus ornatus =

Scientific classification
- Kingdom: Animalia
- Phylum: Arthropoda
- Clade: Pancrustacea
- Class: Insecta
- Order: Hemiptera
- Suborder: Auchenorrhyncha
- Family: Membracidae
- Genus: Negus
- Species: N. ornatus

Binomial name
- Negus ornatus Buckton, 1903

Synonyms
- Negus ornatum

Species of insect

Negus ornatus is a species of treehoppers in the subfamily Centrotinae described by George Bowdler Buckton in 1903. It is found in Cameroon.
