= Lobocentrini =

Scientific classification
- Kingdom: Animalia
- Phylum: Arthropoda
- Clade: Pancrustacea
- Class: Insecta
- Order: Hemiptera
- Suborder: Auchenorrhyncha
- Family: Membracidae
- Subfamily: Centrotinae
- Tribe: Lobocentrini; Wallace & Dietz, 2004

Tribe of true bugs

Lobocentrini is a tribe of treehoppers in the subfamily Centrotinae. It was first described by Matthew Wallace and Lewis Dietz in 2004, and contains 4 genera. The type genus of this tribe is Lobocentrus

== Description ==
Individuals in this tribe are typically 6-7.3 millimeters in length and have black or dark brown coloring.

== Taxonomy ==
Lobocentrini is monophyletic. The tribe is closely related to Boccharini. Prior to the formation of this tribe, all of its genera were placed in the tribe Leptocentrini. Lobocentrus was selected as the type genus because it is the most extensively studied of all the genera within Lobocentrini.

== Genera ==
The following genera are recognized:

- Amphilobocentrus Chou & Yuan, 1982
- Arcuatocornum Yuan & Tian, 1995
- Lobocentrus Stål, 1870
- Truncatocornum Yuan & Tian, 1995

== Distribution and habitat ==
Members of this taxon are present in the Indomalayan, and Palearctic regions. Members of the genera Amphilobocentrus, Arcuatocornum, and Truncatocornum have only been found in China.

== Ecology ==
Members of the tribe Lobocentrini have been observed on host plants in the family Fagaceae.
