= Anchon argutum =

Scientific classification
- Kingdom: Animalia
- Phylum: Arthropoda
- Clade: Pancrustacea
- Class: Insecta
- Order: Hemiptera
- Suborder: Auchenorrhyncha
- Family: Membracidae
- Genus: Anchon
- Species: A. argutum

Binomial name
- Anchon argutum Capener, 1972

Synonyms
- Anchon argutus

Species of insect

Anchon argutum is a species of treehoppers in the subfamily Centrotinae described by Alfred Lawrence Capener in 1972. It is found in Democratic Republic of the Congo and often referred to by its synonym, Anchon argutus.
