= Parayasa typica =

Scientific classification
- Kingdom: Animalia
- Phylum: Arthropoda
- Clade: Pancrustacea
- Class: Insecta
- Order: Hemiptera
- Suborder: Auchenorrhyncha
- Family: Membracidae
- Genus: Parayasa
- Species: P. typica

Binomial name
- Parayasa typica Distant, 1916

Species of insect

Parayasa typica is a species of treehoppers in the subfamily Centrotinae described by William Lucas Distant in 1916. It is the type species of the genus Parayasa, and is found in India.
