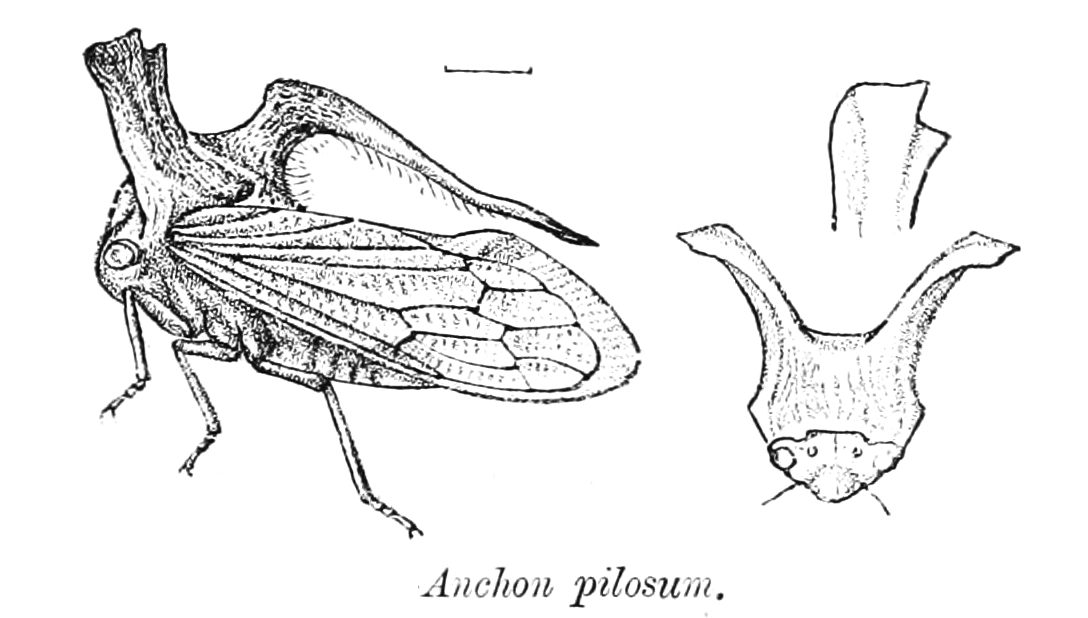
- Anchon pilosum

Scientific classification
- Kingdom: Animalia
- Phylum: Arthropoda
- Clade: Pancrustacea
- Class: Insecta
- Order: Hemiptera
- Suborder: Auchenorrhyncha
- Family: Membracidae
- Subfamily: Centrotinae
- Tribe: Centrotini
- Genus: Anchon; Buckton, 1903

Type species
- Centrotus nodicornis Germar, 1835

= Anchon =

Genus of insects

Anchon is a genus of treehoppers. The name is derived from Greek: ἀγκών (bend, elbow) referring to the characteristic bend in the backward facing horn that arises vertically from the pronotum and turns at a near-right-angle over the abdomen. Two anterior horns rise outwards to the sides in many species. Species in the genus are found in the Afrotropical, Palearctic, and Indomalayan regions. They are placed in the subfamily Centrotinae.

== Species ==
The World Auchenorrhyncha Database includes:

1. Anchon agnatum Capener, 1972
2. Anchon aquilum Capener, 1972
3. Anchon argutum Capener, 1972
4. Anchon aureomaculatus (Capener, 1955)
5. Anchon bilineatus (Stål, 1855)
6. Anchon boneti Peláez, 1935
7. Anchon brevicornis Chou, 1980
8. Anchon brevis Distant, 1908
9. Anchon brunneum Funkhouser, 1937
10. Anchon cornulatum Capener, 1972
11. Anchon decoratum Distant, 1914
12. Anchon dilaticornis Peláez, 1935
13. Anchon dirce Buckton, 1903
14. Anchon dukei Capener, 1972
15. Anchon echinatum Distant, 1908
16. Anchon erici Boulard, 1969
17. Anchon flavipes Schmidt, 1911
18. Anchon gracilis Schmidt, 1911
19. Anchon gunni Funkhouser, 1919
20. Anchon honoratus Capener, 1968
21. Anchon imperator Boulard, 1979
22. Anchon laudatus Capener, 1972
23. Anchon limbatus Schmidt, 1911
24. Anchon lineatus Funkhouser, 1938
25. Anchon malakandensis Khan, Yasmeen & Ahmad, 1979
26. Anchon manifestus Capener, 1972
27. Anchon minor Melichar, 1905
28. Anchon nodicornis (Germar, 1835)
29. Anchon nodosus (Goding, 1930)
30. Anchon pilosus (Walker, 1851)
31. Anchon poensis Peláez, 1935
32. Anchon pontifex Capener, 1972
33. Anchon proximus (Signoret, 1860)
34. Anchon rectangulatus (Kirby, 1891)
35. Anchon regalis Capener, 1953
36. Anchon regina Capener, 1953
37. Anchon remigium Buckton, 1903
38. Anchon rusticanus Capener, 1972
39. Anchon senegalensis (Fairmaire, 1846)
40. Anchon speciosus Capener, 1972
41. Anchon tribulis Capener, 1972
42. Anchon ulniformis Buckton, 1903
43. Anchon vicinus (Signoret, 1858)
44. Anchon vietnamensis Chou, 1980
45. Anchon ximenes Capener, 1953
46. Anchon yunnanensis Chou, 1980
