= Parayasa variegata =

Scientific classification
- Kingdom: Animalia
- Phylum: Arthropoda
- Clade: Pancrustacea
- Class: Insecta
- Order: Hemiptera
- Suborder: Auchenorrhyncha
- Family: Membracidae
- Genus: Parayasa
- Species: P. variegata

Binomial name
- Parayasa variegata Thirumalai & Ananthasubramanian, 1981

Species of insect

Parayasa variegata is a species of treehoppers in the subfamily Centrotinae described by Thirumalai & Ananthasubramanian in 1981. It is found in southern India.
