= Parayasa =

- Parayasa typica

Scientific classification
- Kingdom: Animalia
- Phylum: Arthropoda
- Clade: Pancrustacea
- Class: Insecta
- Order: Hemiptera
- Suborder: Auchenorrhyncha
- Family: Membracidae
- Subfamily: Centrotinae
- Tribe: Gargarini
- Genus: Parayasa; Distant, 1916

Type species
- Parayasa typica Distant, 1916

Genus of insects

Parayasa is a genus of treehoppers in the subfamily Centrotinae. It was first described by William Lucas Distant in 1916. Species within this genus are widespread throughout the Old World, with specimens known from the Democratic Republic of the Congo, India, and the island of Borneo.

== Species ==
The following species are recognized:

- Parayasa affinis Distant, 1916
- Parayasa affixa Distant, 1916
- Parayasa atricapilla Distant, 1916
- Parayasa dissimilis Distant, 1916
- Parayasa elegantula Distant, 1916
- Parayasa fasciata Ananthasubramanian, 1980
- Parayasa maculipennis Funkhouser, 1920
- Parayasa maculosa Distant, 1916
- Parayasa margherita Distant, 1916
- Parayasa modesta Distant, 1916
- Parayasa nigrolimbata Ananthasubramanian, 1980
- Parayasa nilgiriensis Distant, 1916
- Parayasa pilosa Ananthasubramanian, 1980
- Parayasa rustica Distant, 1916
- Parayasa typica Distant, 1916
- Parayasa variegata Thirumalai & Ananthasubramanian, 1981
