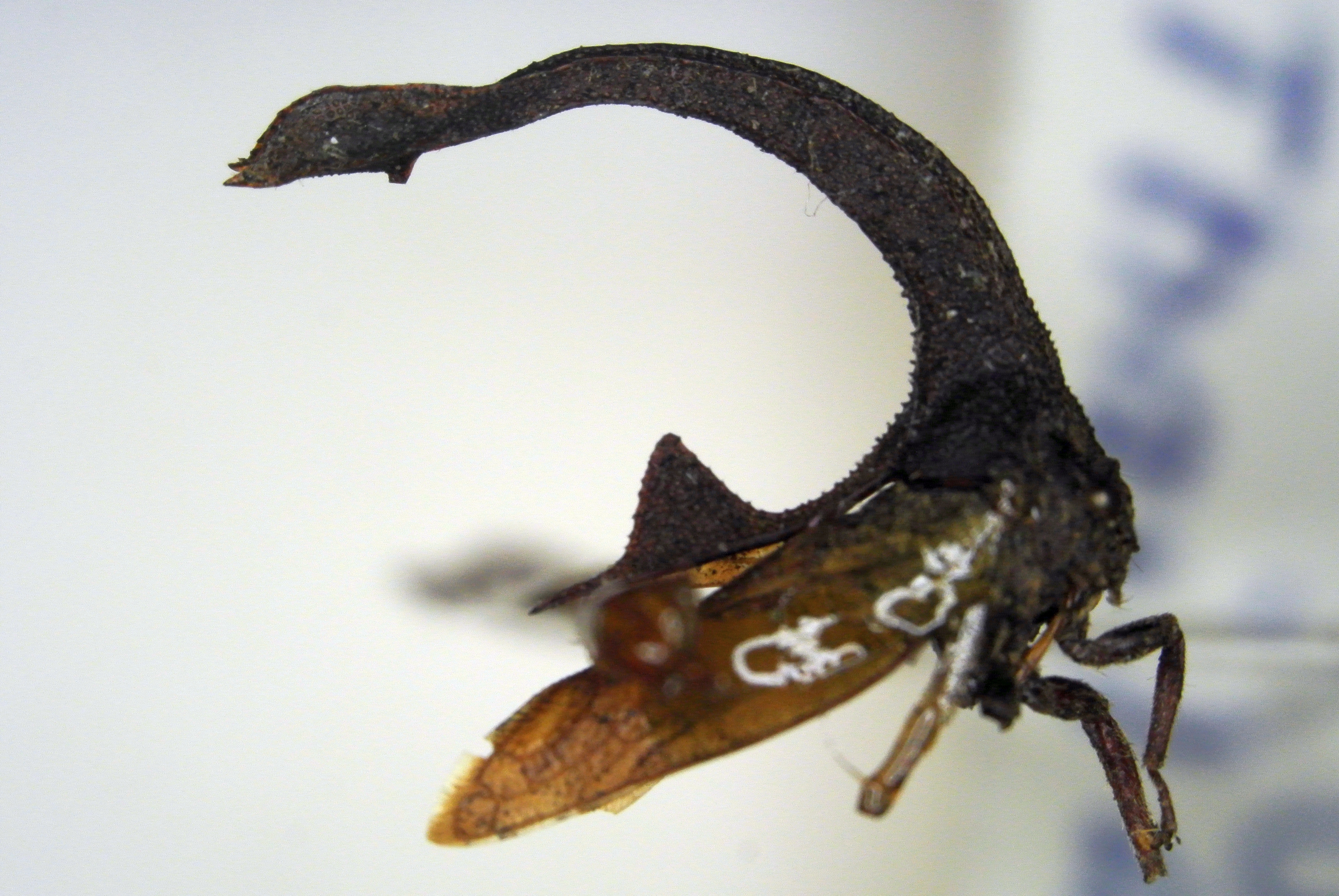
- Hypsauchenia hardwickii

Scientific classification
- Kingdom: Animalia
- Phylum: Arthropoda
- Clade: Pancrustacea
- Class: Insecta
- Order: Hemiptera
- Suborder: Auchenorrhyncha
- Family: Membracidae
- Subfamily: Centrotinae
- Tribe: Hypsaucheniini; Distant, 1908

= Hypsaucheniini =

Tribe of true bugs

Hypsaucheniini is a tribe of treehoppers in the subfamily Centrotinae. It was first described by William Lucas Distant in 1908, and contains 7 genera. The type genus of this tribe is Hypsauchenia.

== Description ==
Individuals in this tribe are typically 4.5-7.3 millimeters in length and have tan or dark brown coloring.

== Taxonomy ==
This tribe monophyletic, and is closely related to the tribes Oxyrhachini, Ebhuloidesini, and Terentiini. The tribes Ebhuloidesini, Hypsaucheniini, Oxyrhachini, and Terentiini together form a monophyletic group. In the past, the genus Pyrgonota was categorized within Hypsaucheniini, but has since been moved to Terentiini.

== Genera ==
The following genera are recognized:

- Gigantorhabdus Schmidt, 1906
- Hybanda Distant, 1908
- Hybandoides Distant, 1915
- Hypsauchenia Germar, 1835
- Hypsolyrium Schmidt, 1926
- Jingkara Chou, 1964
- Pyrgauchenia Breddin, 1901

== Distribution and habitat ==
Members of this taxon are widespread throughout the Indomalayan and Palearctic regions.

== Ecology ==
Members of the tribe Hypsaucheniini have been observed on host plants from many families, including Annonaceae, Compositae, Euphorbiaceae, and Leguminosae. The genera Gigantorhadus, Hybandoides, Hypsauchenia, and Pyrgauchenia are reported to engage in myrmecophily. Female individuals within the genera Gigantorhabdus, Hybandoides, and Pyrgauchenia are observed to engage in maternal egg guarding.
