= Parayasa nigrolimbata =

Scientific classification
- Kingdom: Animalia
- Phylum: Arthropoda
- Clade: Pancrustacea
- Class: Insecta
- Order: Hemiptera
- Suborder: Auchenorrhyncha
- Family: Membracidae
- Genus: Parayasa
- Species: P. nigrolimbata

Binomial name
- Parayasa nigrolimbata Ananthasubramanian, 1980

Species of insect

Parayasa nigrolimbata is a species of treehoppers in the subfamily Centrotinae described by Ananthasubramanian in 1980. It is found in southern India.
