= Parayasa maculipennis =

Scientific classification
- Kingdom: Animalia
- Phylum: Arthropoda
- Clade: Pancrustacea
- Class: Insecta
- Order: Hemiptera
- Suborder: Auchenorrhyncha
- Family: Membracidae
- Genus: Parayasa
- Species: P. maculipennis

Binomial name
- Parayasa maculipennis Funkhouser, 1920

Species of insect

Parayasa maculipennis is a species of treehoppers in the subfamily Centrotinae described by William Delbert Funkhouser in 1920. It is found on the island of Borneo.
