= Anchon honoratus =

Scientific classification
- Kingdom: Animalia
- Phylum: Arthropoda
- Clade: Pancrustacea
- Class: Insecta
- Order: Hemiptera
- Suborder: Auchenorrhyncha
- Family: Membracidae
- Genus: Anchon
- Species: A. honoratus

Binomial name
- Anchon honoratus Capener, 1968

Species of insect

Anchon honoratus is a species of treehoppers in the subfamily Centrotinae described by Alfred Lawrence Capener in 1968. It is found in South Sudan.
