= Anchon cornulatum =

Scientific classification
- Kingdom: Animalia
- Phylum: Arthropoda
- Clade: Pancrustacea
- Class: Insecta
- Order: Hemiptera
- Suborder: Auchenorrhyncha
- Family: Membracidae
- Genus: Anchon
- Species: A. cornulatum

Binomial name
- Anchon cornulatum Capener, 1972

Synonyms
- Anchon cornulatus

Species of insect

Anchon cornulatum is a species of treehoppers in the subfamily Centrotinae described by Alfred Lawrence Capener in 1972. It is found in South Africa.
