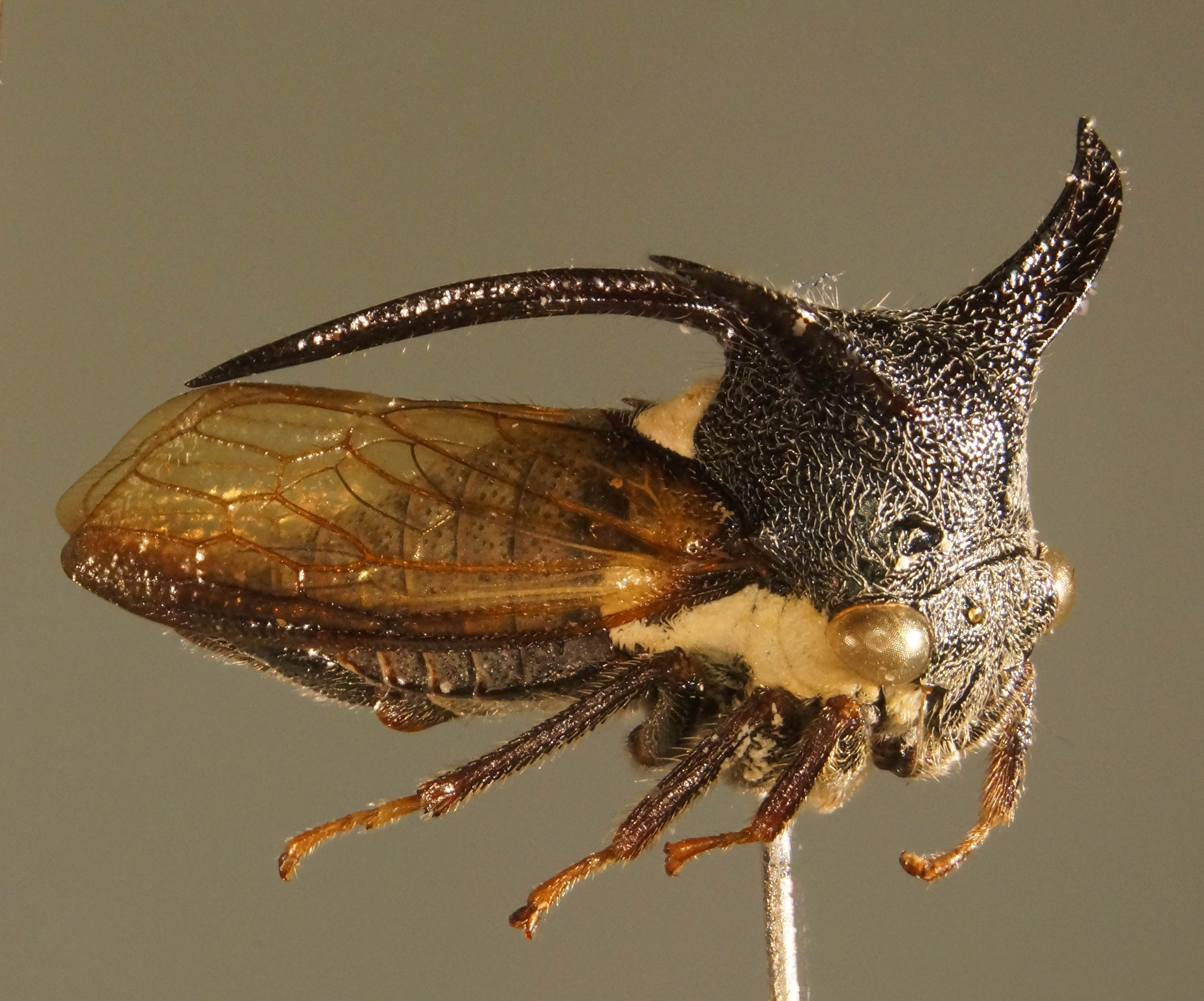
- Leptocentrus leucaspis

Scientific classification
- Kingdom: Animalia
- Phylum: Arthropoda
- Clade: Pancrustacea
- Class: Insecta
- Order: Hemiptera
- Suborder: Auchenorrhyncha
- Family: Membracidae
- Subfamily: Centrotinae
- Tribe: Leptocentrini
- Genus: Leptocentrus; Stål, 1866

Synonyms
- Leeptocentrus [sic] Stål, 1866; Leptocentrotus [sic] Stål, 1866 and other orthographic variants; Rabduchus Buckton, 1903; Rbduchus [sic] Buckton, 1903

= Leptocentrus =

Genus of true bugs

Leptocentrus is a genus of tree-hoppers typical of the tribe Leptocentrini, erected by Carl Stål in 1866. Species have mostly been recorded from Africa, South, East and SE Asia, through to Australia.

== Species ==
The World Auchenorrhyncha Database includes:

1. Leptocentrus abdullah Distant, 1916
2. Leptocentrus acuticornis Ananthasubramanian, 1980
3. Leptocentrus albolineatus Funkhouser, 1937
4. Leptocentrus albonotatus Distant, 1916
5. Leptocentrus albus Funkhouser, 1929
6. Leptocentrus altifrons (Walker, 1851)
7. Leptocentrus amoenus Capener, 1968
8. Leptocentrus antilope (Stål, 1859)
9. Leptocentrus arcuatus Funkhouser, 1927
10. Leptocentrus arebiensis Goding, 1932
11. Leptocentrus atratus (Walker, 1851)
12. Leptocentrus aureomaculatus Distant, 1916
13. Leptocentrus auricomus Capener, 1966
14. Leptocentrus bajulans Distant, 1916
15. Leptocentrus basilewskyi Capener, 1955
16. Leptocentrus bauhiniae Ananthasubramanian & Ananthakrishnan, 1975
17. Leptocentrus beluri Ananthasubramanian, 1980
18. Leptocentrus bengalensis Ahmad & Mohammad, 1994
19. Leptocentrus bolivari Peláez, 1935
20. Leptocentrus bos (Signoret, 1858) – type species (as Centrotus bos Signoret, 1858)
21. Leptocentrus carinatus Ananthasubramanian, 1980
22. Leptocentrus cinereus Capener, 1955
23. Leptocentrus comosus Capener, 1972
24. Leptocentrus coronulus Boulard, 1979
25. Leptocentrus erectus Mohammad & Ahmad, 1993
26. Leptocentrus fasciatus Haglund, 1899
27. Leptocentrus flexicornis (Walker, 1858)
28. Leptocentrus gnomon (Buckton, 1903)
29. Leptocentrus gracilis Funkhouser, 1927
30. Leptocentrus gregoryi Capener, 1972
31. Leptocentrus horizontalis Kato, 1940
32. Leptocentrus horizontatus Mohammad & Ahmad, 1989
33. Leptocentrus impunctus Buckton, 1905
34. Leptocentrus indigoferae Linnavuori, 1973
35. Leptocentrus insignis Distant, 1908
36. Leptocentrus jacobsoni Funkhouser, 1927
37. Leptocentrus lama (Signoret, 1858)
38. Leptocentrus leucaspis (Walker, 1858)
39. Leptocentrus limbipennis Jacobi, 1910
40. Leptocentrus lobayensis Boulard, 1969
41. Leptocentrus longiformis Ahmad & Mohammad, 1993
42. Leptocentrus longispinus Distant, 1908
43. Leptocentrus luteus Ananthasubramanian, 1980
44. Leptocentrus macarangae Boulard, 1969
45. Leptocentrus madli Boulard, 1995
46. Leptocentrus majesticus Ananthasubramanian, 1980
47. Leptocentrus major Ananthasubramanian & Ananthakrishnan, 1975
48. Leptocentrus mangiferae Ananthasubramanian & Ananthakrishnan, 1975
49. Leptocentrus manilaensis Funkhouser, 1927
50. Leptocentrus mephistopheles Buckton, 1903
51. Leptocentrus moringae Ananthasubramanian & Ananthakrishnan, 1975
52. Leptocentrus neoalbonotatus Mohammad & Ahmad, 1989
53. Leptocentrus niger Ananthasubramanian & Ananthakrishnan, 1975
54. Leptocentrus nordicornis Ahmad & Mohammad, 1994
55. Leptocentrus nubianus Capener, 1972
56. Leptocentrus obliquus (Walker, 1858)
57. Leptocentrus obortus Distant, 1916
58. Leptocentrus orientalis Schumacher, 1915
59. Leptocentrus paganus Capener, 1966
60. Leptocentrus pakistanensis Ahmad & Mohammad, 1994
61. Leptocentrus peracatus Distant, 1916
62. Leptocentrus pilosus Funkhouser, 1936
63. Leptocentrus pubescens Funkhouser, 1937
64. Leptocentrus pudicus Capener, 1972
65. Leptocentrus pugnulus Boulard, 1977
66. Leptocentrus punjabensis Ahmad & Mohammad, 1993
67. Leptocentrus purpureus Funkhouser, 1929
68. Leptocentrus recurvus (Distant, 1916)
69. Leptocentrus reponens (Walker, 1851)
70. Leptocentrus rhizophagus Ananthasubramanian & Ananthakrishnan, 1975
71. Leptocentrus rubrinigris Ananthasubramanian, 1980
72. Leptocentrus rufescens Ananthasubramanian, 1980
73. Leptocentrus rufipennis (Buckton, 1905)
74. Leptocentrus rufipilosus Capener, 1957
75. Leptocentrus rufospinus Funkhouser, 1927
76. Leptocentrus rufotibialis Capener, 1968
77. Leptocentrus scutellatus Distant, 1916
78. Leptocentrus splendens Ananthasubramanian, 1980
79. Leptocentrus subflavus Noualhier, 1896
80. Leptocentrus substitutus (Walker, 1851)
81. Leptocentrus taiwanus Kato, 1954
82. Leptocentrus taunsi Ahmad & Mohammad, 1993
83. Leptocentrus taurifrons (Walker, 1851)
84. Leptocentrus taurus (Fabricius, 1775)
85. Leptocentrus taxilensis Ahmad & Mohammad, 1993
86. Leptocentrus tenuicornis Funkhouser, 1927
87. Leptocentrus terminalis (Walker, 1851)
88. Leptocentrus ugandensis Distant, 1916
89. Leptocentrus ustus Buckton, 1903
90. Leptocentrus varicornis Ananthasubramanian & Ananthakrishnan, 1975
91. Leptocentrus vicarius (Walker, 1851)
