= Cheilomenes polynesiae =

Scientific classification
- Kingdom: Animalia
- Phylum: Arthropoda
- Clade: Pancrustacea
- Class: Insecta
- Order: Coleoptera
- Suborder: Polyphaga
- Infraorder: Cucujiformia
- Family: Coccinellidae
- Genus: Cheilomenes
- Species: C. polynesiae

Binomial name
- Cheilomenes polynesiae Crotch, 1874

Species of beetle

Cheilomenes polynesiae is a species of beetle of the family Coccinellidae. It is found in Fiji and Australia (Norfolk Island, Philip Island).

== Description ==
Adults reach a length of about 5.7–6 mm (0.22–0.24 in). The frons and antennae are yellow in males, while in females, the frons is yellow with a black marking. The pronotum is black with large yellow areas and the scutellum is black. The elytra are yellow, with black margins and sutural area.
