= Platycentrini =

Scientific classification
- Kingdom: Animalia
- Phylum: Arthropoda
- Clade: Pancrustacea
- Class: Insecta
- Order: Hemiptera
- Suborder: Auchenorrhyncha
- Family: Membracidae
- Subfamily: Centrotinae
- Tribe: Platycentrini; Haupt, 1929

Tribe of true bugs

Platycentrini is a tribe of treehoppers in the subfamily Centrotinae. It was first described by Hermann Haupt in 1929, and contains 2 genera. The type genus of this tribe is Platycentrus. Individuals in this tribe are typically 4.5-6 millimeters in length and have brown, tan, or mottled coloring.

== Genera ==
The following genera are recognized:

- Platycentrus Stål, 1869
- Tylocentrus Van Duzee, 1908
