= Centrotypus =

Scientific classification
- Kingdom: Animalia
- Phylum: Arthropoda
- Class: Insecta
- Order: Hemiptera
- Suborder: Auchenorrhyncha
- Family: Membracidae
- Subfamily: Centrotinae
- Genus: Centrotypus; Stål, 1866

Genus of insects

Centrotypus is a genus of treehoppers belonging to the subfamily Centrotinae and typical of the tribe Centrotypini, found in Asia and Australia.

== Species ==
Centrotypus includes:

- Centrotypus acuticornis Schmidt, 1926
- Centrotypus aduncus Buckton
- Centrotypus amplicornis Stål
- Centrotypus assamensis Fairmaire
- Centrotypus ater Buckton
- Centrotypus belus Buckton
- Centrotypus bowringi Distant
- Centrotypus chrysopterus Chou & Yuan
- Centrotypus curvocornis Chou & Yuan
- Centrotypus erigens Walker
- Centrotypus flavescens Distant, 1908
- Centrotypus flexuosa Fabricius, 1794
- Centrotypus folicornis Chou & Yuan
- Centrotypus forticornis Walker, 1870
- Centrotypus heinrichsi Schmidt, 1926
- Centrotypus javanensis Fairmaire
- Centrotypus laminifer Walker, 1857
- Centrotypus langei Schmidt, 1926
- Centrotypus laticornis Funkhouser
- Centrotypus latimargo Walker, 1859
- Centrotypus longicornis Vuillefroy
- Centrotypus malabaricus Ananthasubramanian, 1996
- Centrotypus merinjakensis Distant
- Centrotypus neocornis Chou & Yuan
- Centrotypus neuter Fairmaire
- Centrotypus nigris Funkhouser, 1927
- Centrotypus ortus Distant, 1908
- Centrotypus oxyricornis Chou & Yuan
- Centrotypus pactolus Buckton
- Centrotypus perakensis Distant
- Centrotypus pulniensis Ananthasubramanian, 1996
- Centrotypus securis Buckton
- Centrotypus shelfordi Distant
- Centrotypus siamensis Distant
- Centrotypus tauriformis Distant
- Centrotypus taurus Distant
