= Xiphopoeini =

Scientific classification
- Kingdom: Animalia
- Phylum: Arthropoda
- Clade: Pancrustacea
- Class: Insecta
- Order: Hemiptera
- Suborder: Auchenorrhyncha
- Family: Membracidae
- Subfamily: Centrotinae
- Tribe: Xiphopoeini; Capener, 1966

Tribe of true bugs

Xiphopoeini is a tribe of African treehoppers in the subfamily Centrotinae. It was first described by Alfred Lawrence Capener in 1966, and contains 2 genera. The type genus of this tribe is Xiphopoeus. Individuals in this tribe are typically 4.7-6.3 millimeters in length and have brown or dark brown coloring.

== Genera ==
The following genera are recognized:

- Negus Jacobi, 1910
- Xiphopoeus Stål, 1866
