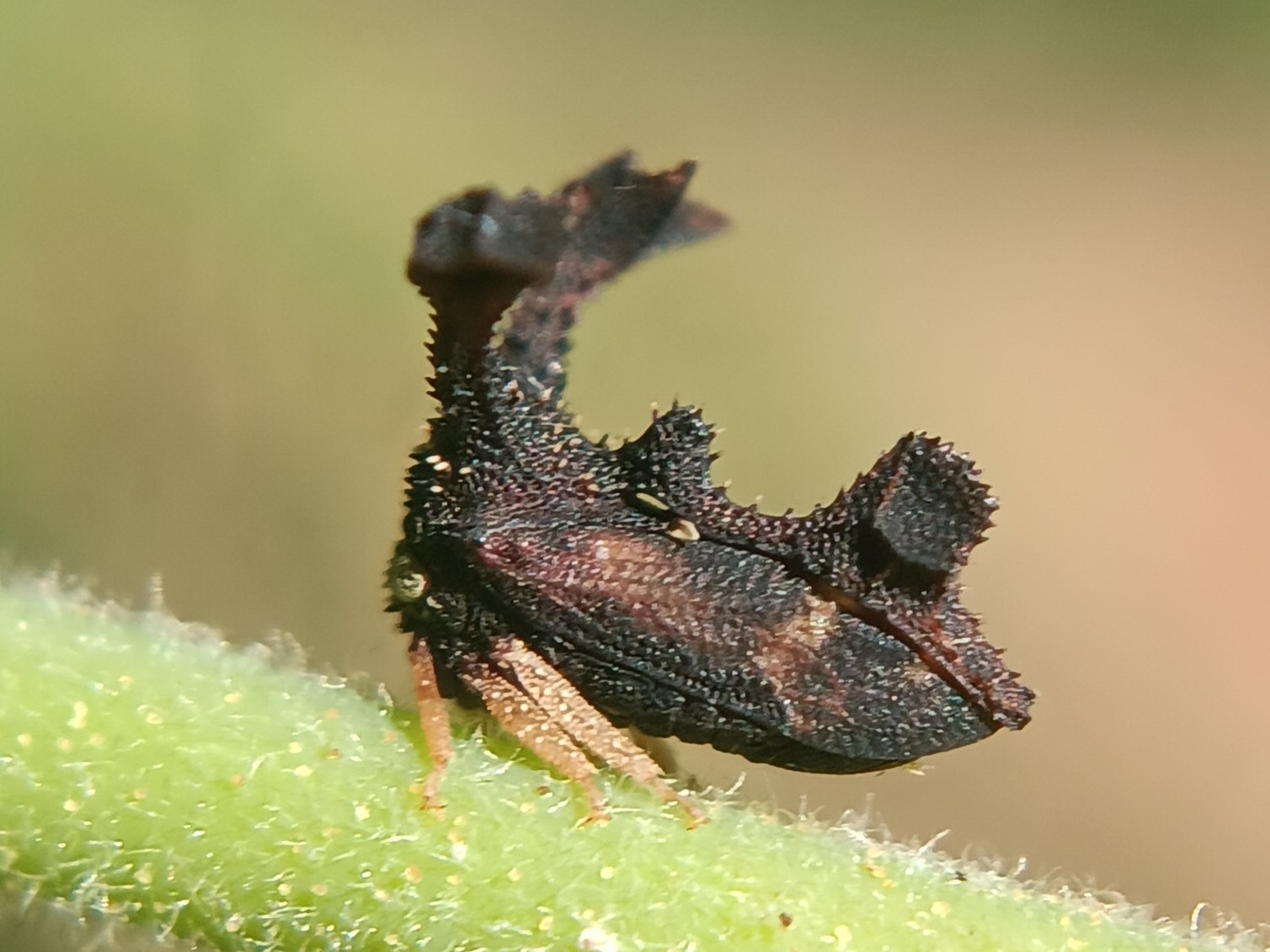
- Centrochares horrificus

Scientific classification
- Kingdom: Animalia
- Phylum: Arthropoda
- Clade: Pancrustacea
- Class: Insecta
- Order: Hemiptera
- Suborder: Auchenorrhyncha
- Family: Membracidae
- Subfamily: Centrotinae
- Tribe: Centrocharesini; Goding, 1931
- Genus: Centrochares; Stål, 1866

= Centrochares =

Genus of treehopper

Centrochares is a genus of treehoppers belonging to the subfamily Centrotinae. It was erected by Carl Stål in 1866. It is only genus in the tribe Centrocharesini, which was erected by Frederic Webster Goding in 1931. To date (July 2025) species have been recorded from Malesia (including the Philippines) and Yunnan province.

== Species ==
The World Auchenorrhyncha Database includes:

1. Centrochares borneensis Distant, 1916
2. Centrochares floripennis Yuan & Fan, 1995
3. Centrochares foliata Funkhouser, 1929
4. Centrochares horrifica Westwood, 1837 – type species (as Centrotus horrificus Westwood)
5. Centrochares maculopterus Chou & Yuan, 1984
6. Centrochares ridleyana Distant, 1915
7. Centrochares spinifera Funkhouser, 1927
