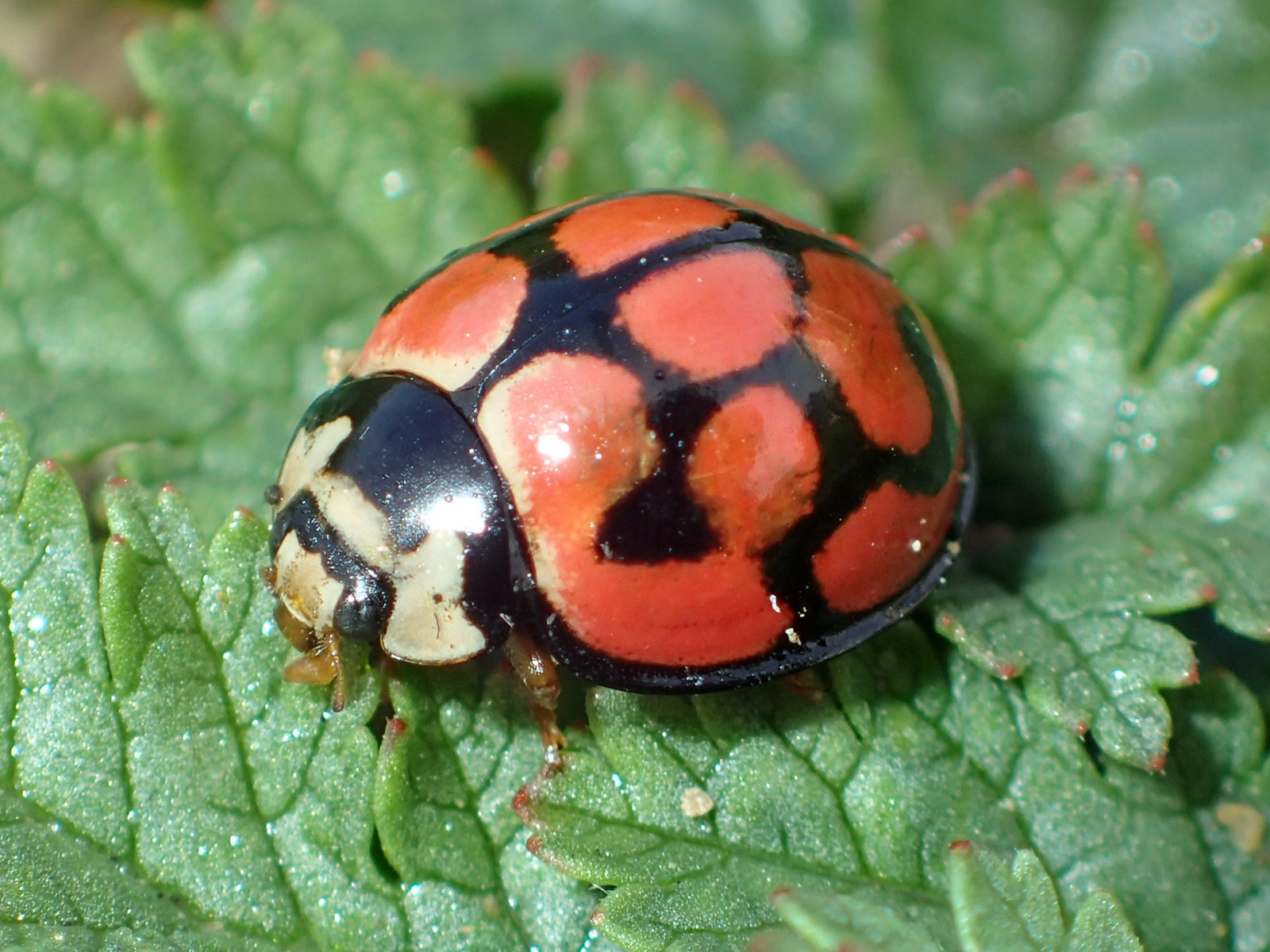
- Cheilomenes lunata in Cape Town, South Africa

Scientific classification
- Kingdom: Animalia
- Phylum: Arthropoda
- Clade: Pancrustacea
- Class: Insecta
- Order: Coleoptera
- Suborder: Polyphaga
- Infraorder: Cucujiformia
- Family: Coccinellidae
- Genus: Cheilomenes
- Species: C. lunata

Binomial name
- Cheilomenes lunata (Fabricius, 1775)

Synonyms
- Coccinella lunata Fabricius, 1775; Coccinella rivosa Thunberg, 1781; Cheilomenes orbicularis Casey, 1899

= Cheilomenes lunata =

Lunate ladybird

Species of beetle

Cheilomenes lunata is a species of ladybird. It was described by Johan Christian Fabricius in 1775.
