= Cheilomenes samoensis =

Scientific classification
- Kingdom: Animalia
- Phylum: Arthropoda
- Clade: Pancrustacea
- Class: Insecta
- Order: Coleoptera
- Suborder: Polyphaga
- Infraorder: Cucujiformia
- Family: Coccinellidae
- Genus: Cheilomenes
- Species: C. samoensis

Binomial name
- Cheilomenes samoensis Arrow, 1927

Synonyms
- Cheilomenes samoensis var. tutuilensis Arrow, 1927

Species of beetle

Cheilomenes samoensis is a species of beetle of the family Coccinellidae. It is found on Samoa and American Samoa.

== Description ==
Adults reach a length of about 3.7–4.1 mm (0.15–0.16 in). The frons and antennae are yellow and the pronotum is yellow with a large black area. The scutellum is black and the elytra are black, each elytron with a reddish medial spot and a yellow apical spot.
