= Centrodontini =

Scientific classification
- Kingdom: Animalia
- Phylum: Arthropoda
- Clade: Pancrustacea
- Class: Insecta
- Order: Hemiptera
- Suborder: Auchenorrhyncha
- Family: Membracidae
- Subfamily: Centrotinae
- Tribe: Centrodontini; Deitz, 1975

Tribe of true bugs

Centrodontini is a tribe of treehoppers in the subfamily Centrotinae. It was first described by Lewis Deitz in 1975, and contains 3 genera. The type genus of this tribe is Centrodontus

== Description ==
Individuals in this tribe are typically 2.3-4.7 millimeters in length and have brown, mottled brown, reddish brown, or tan coloring.

== Taxonomy ==
Centrodontini is monophyletic. It was previously placed in the subfamily Centrodontinae, which has since been made a synonym of Centrotinae.

== Genera ==
The following genera are recognized:

- Centrodontus Goding, 1892
- Multareis Goding, 1895
- Multareoides Cook, 1953

== Distribution and habitat ==
Members of this taxon are widespread throughout the Nearctic and Neotropical regions, with many occurrences in the United States and Mexico.

== Ecology ==
Members of the tribe Centrodontini have been observed on the creosote host plant species Larrea divaricata in the family Zygophyllaceae.
