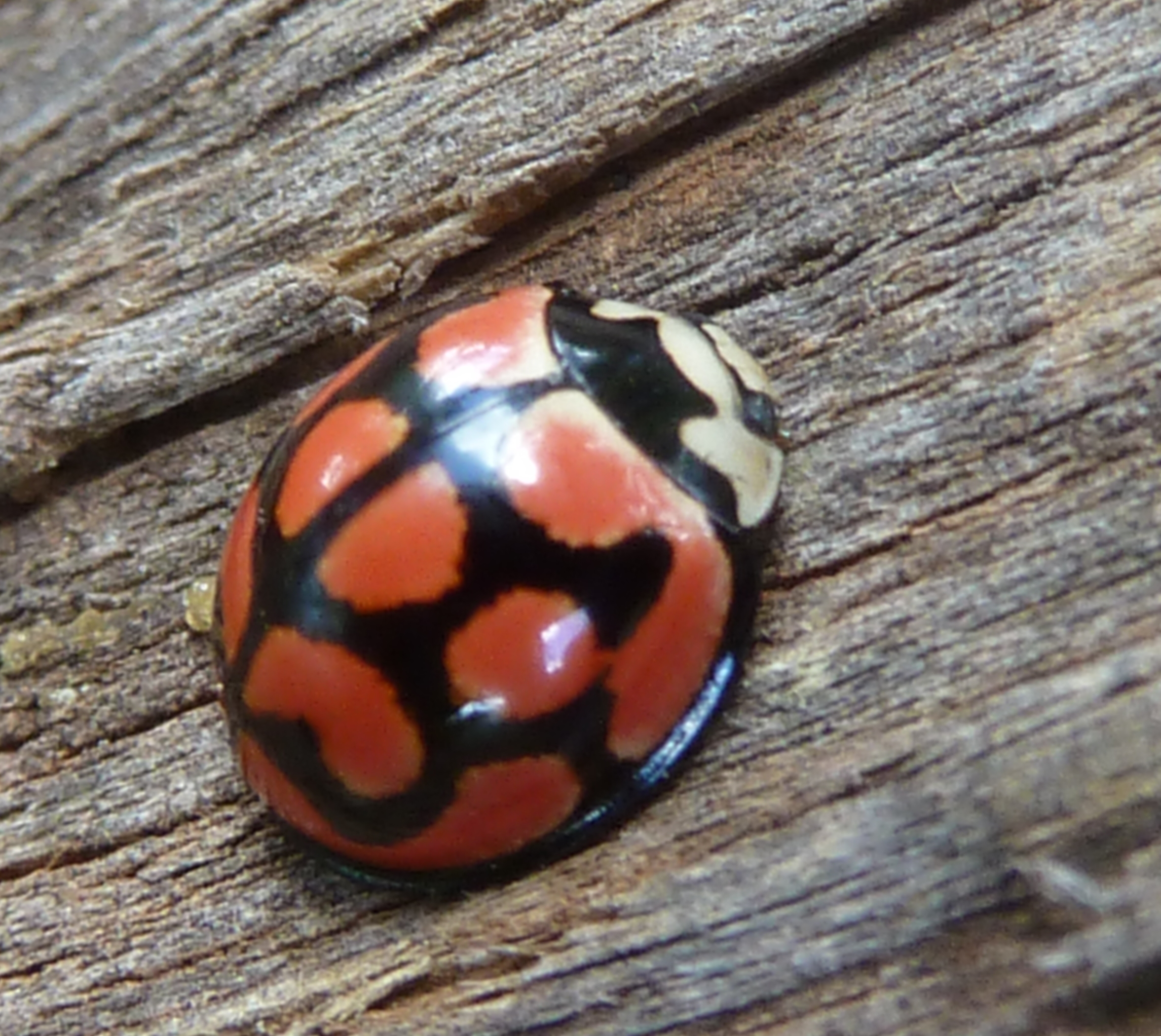
- Cheilomenes lunata in South Africa

Scientific classification
- Kingdom: Animalia
- Phylum: Arthropoda
- Clade: Pancrustacea
- Class: Insecta
- Order: Coleoptera
- Suborder: Polyphaga
- Infraorder: Cucujiformia
- Family: Coccinellidae
- Subfamily: Coccinellinae
- Genus: Cheilomenes; Chevrolat, 1837

Synonyms
- Chilomenes; Cydonia Mulsant, 1850; Elpis Mulsant, 1850; Menochilus Timberlake, 1943

= Cheilomenes =

Genus of beetles

Cheilomenes is a genus of ladybirds (Coccinellidae). Like other members of their subfamily they are large typical ladybirds. They are always shiny and often have bright spots on the elytra. The common African species C. lunata is an important predator of the citrus aphid, Toxoptera, and wheat aphid, while C. vicina has been suggested as a biological control agent for the cowpea aphid. Both the larvae and adults are predatory. Freshly emerged larvae consume unhatched eggs, and eventually have a dappled appearance and 6 tubercles on each abdominal segment. Vulnerable stages in the life of C. sexmaculata, including oviposition, hatching, moulting and pupation have been shown to occur after dark, probably as an adaptation to avoid exposure to natural enemies.

== Species ==
- Cheilomenes angulifera
- Cheilomenes aurora
- Cheilomenes biguttata
- Cheilomenes coccinelloides
- Cheilomenes congoana
- Cheilomenes copiosa
- Cheilomenes crucigera
- Cheilomenes dolens
- Cheilomenes dorsalis
- Cheilomenes duodecimpunctata
- Cheilomenes geisha
- Cheilomenes infirma
- Cheilomenes kamerunensis
- Cheilomenes lunata Fabricius, 1775
- Cheilomenes magnifica
- Cheilomenes picticollis
- Cheilomenes polynesiae
- Cheilomenes pretiosa
- Cheilomenes propinqua (Mulsant, 1850)
- Cheilomenes quadrilineata
- Cheilomenes rufipennis
- Cheilomenes samoensis
- Cheilomenes schmidti
- Cheilomenes secessionis
- Cheilomenes securigera
- Cheilomenes sexmaculata (Fabricius, 1781)
- Cheilomenes signaticollis
- Cheilomenes singularis
- Cheilomenes sulfurea (Olivier, 1791)
- Cheilomenes tetrica
- Cheilomenes triangulifera
- Cheilomenes variiventris
- Cheilomenes vittata
- Cheilomenes zonata

== Gallery ==
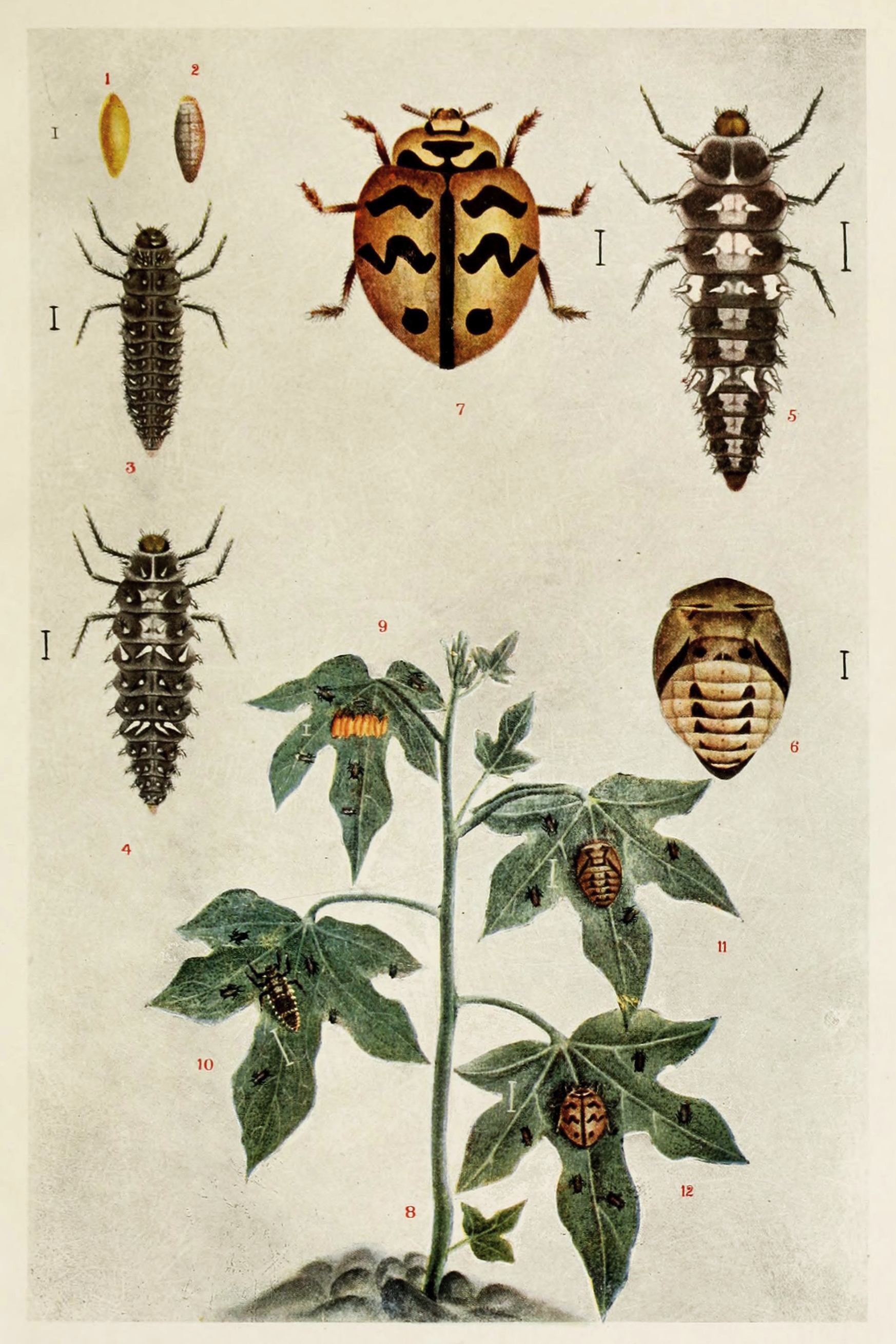
The Six-spotted zigzag ladybird, C. sexmaculata, of Asia and Australasia

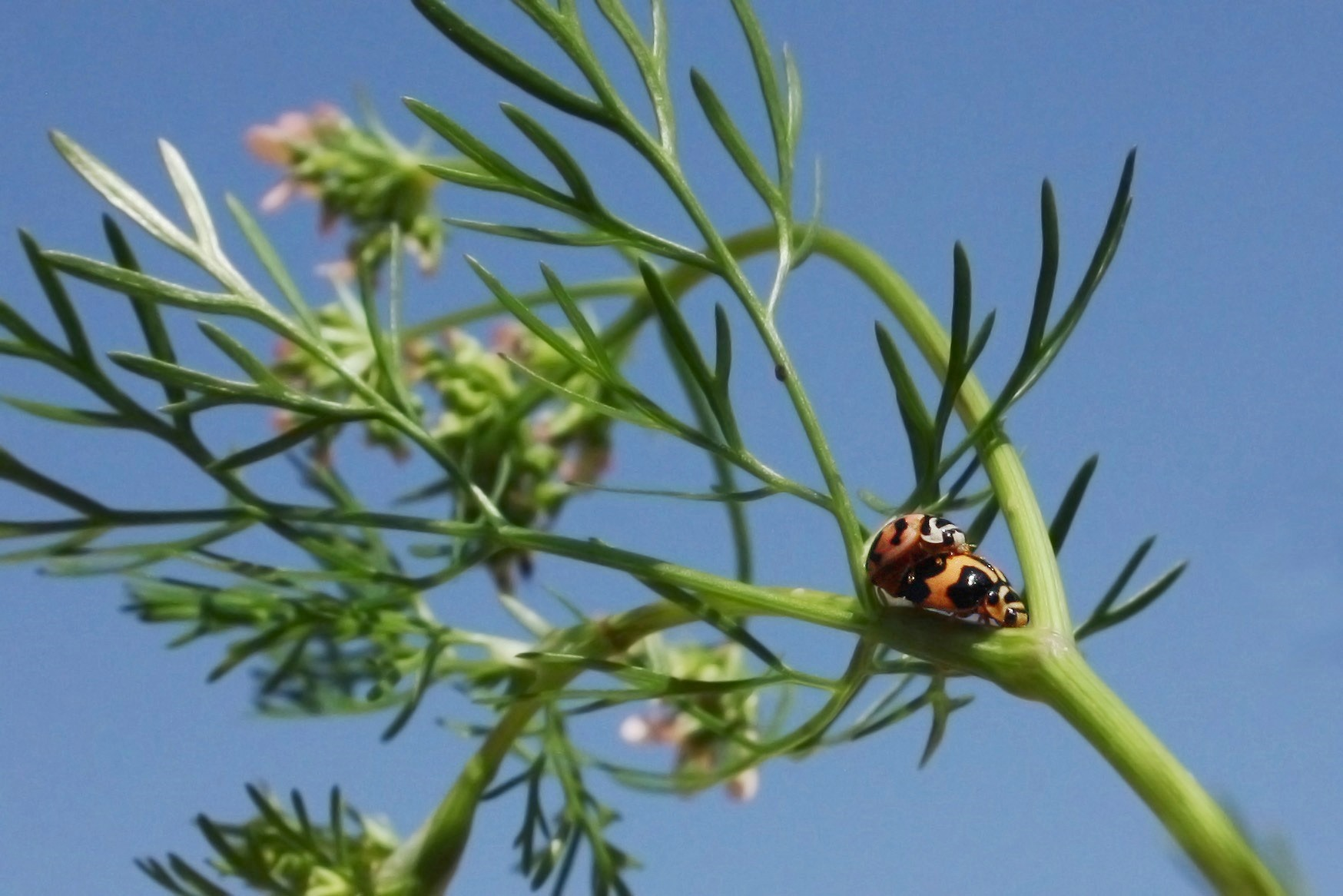
C. sexmaculata at Zighy Bay, Musandam Peninsula, Oman

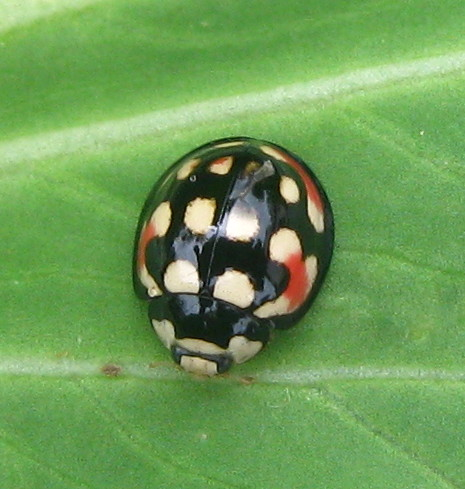
C. sulfurea at Chimoio, Mozambique

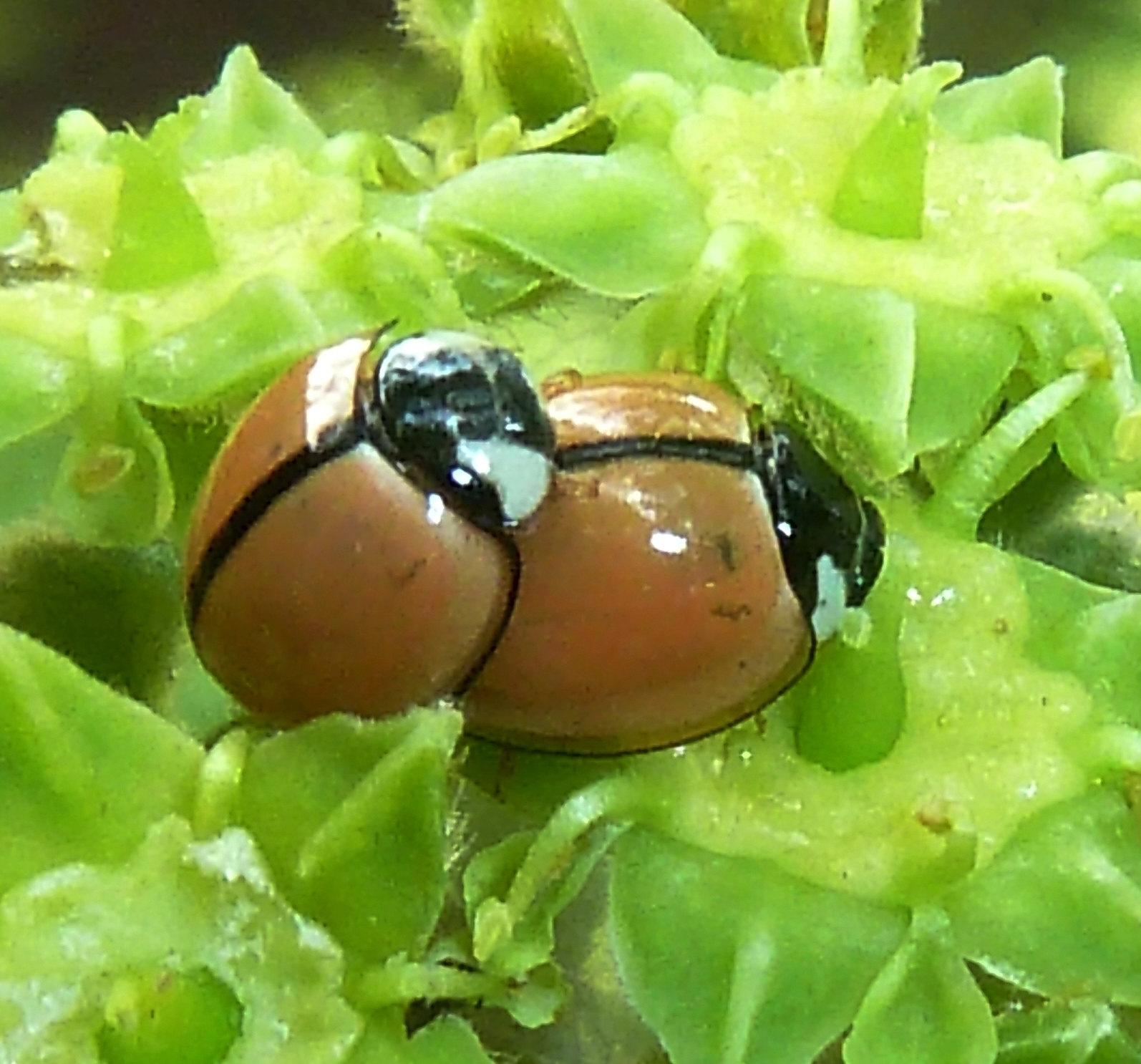
C. propinqua in South Africa

== See also ==
- List of Coccinellidae genera and species
