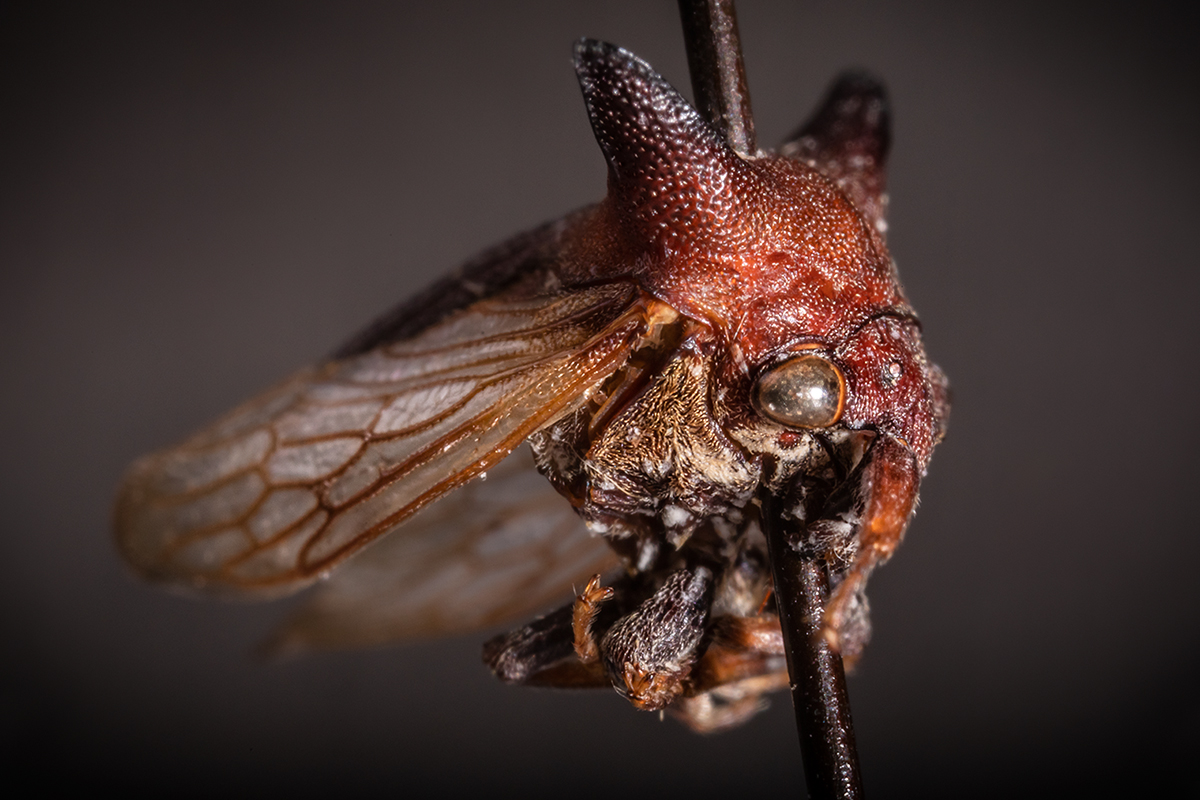
- Diagonal lateral view

Scientific classification
- Kingdom: Animalia
- Phylum: Arthropoda
- Class: Insecta
- Order: Hemiptera
- Suborder: Auchenorrhyncha
- Family: Membracidae
- Subfamily: Centrotinae
- Genus: Kaikaia
- Species: K. gaga

Binomial name
- Kaikaia gaga Morris & Dietrich, 2020

= Kaikaia =

Genus of treehopper

Kaikaia is a genus of treehopper endemic to Nicaragua, containing the single species Kaikaia gaga. It was described in 2020 by Brendan Morris, a Ph.D. student at the University of Illinois at Urbana-Champaign. It entered the news when it was revealed that the insect was named after Lady Gaga.

== Discovery ==
A paper detailing its discovery was published in Zootaxa, written by Morris and co-authored by Illinois Natural History Survey entomologist Christopher Dietrich. K. gaga was collected in the early 1990s and "sat in a museum". Morris started studying the species in 2012, when he received it along with trays of various unidentified types of treehoppers from the Carnegie Library of Pittsburgh. A curator there "just started shoving boxes of bugs" at Morris to identify and study.

== Taxonomy ==
Kaikaia is derived from the Miskito word for "to see." Miskito is an indigenous language from Nicaragua, where this bug was originally discovered in the 1990s.

On naming the insect after Lady Gaga, Morris said: "It's just kind of their theme as a family of insects to have these very diverse and other-wordly [sic] forms that you wouldn't expect from an insect. Gaga often brings the unexpected and makes it popular."

== Appearance ==
Kaikaia gaga is a darkish purple and red with two horns jutting out the top, which have been compared to shoulder pads.

An excerpt from the Zootaxa paper detailing Kaikaia's appearance:

Kaikaia is particularly notable in having an assemblage of features more characteristic of the Old World centrotine tribe Beaufortianini than currently recognized New World centrotine tribes. Kaikaia lacks cucullate setae of the mesothoracic femora, which are present in the Boocerini and to some extent, the Platycentrini. The new genus also has an additional m-cu crossvein in the forewing, as well as a frontoclypeal shape and overall appearance similar to Platycentrus Stål. Nevertheless, Kaikaia differs from Platycentrus in its narrow, straight shape of the second valvulae, which bear several prominently raised dorsal teeth and an acute projection along the dorsal margin that resemble those of some members of Nessorhinini.
