= Ebhul =

Scientific classification
- Kingdom: Animalia
- Phylum: Arthropoda
- Clade: Pancrustacea
- Class: Insecta
- Order: Hemiptera
- Suborder: Auchenorrhyncha
- Family: Membracidae
- Subfamily: Centrotinae
- Tribe: Ebhuloidesini; Goding, 1931
- Genus: Ebhul; Distant, 1908

Synonyms
- Ebhuloides Goding, 1931

Tribe of true bugs

Ebhul is a genus of treehoppers in the subfamily Centrotinae. It was first described by William Lucas Distant in 1908, and is the only genus within the tribe Ebhuloidesini. Individuals in this genus are typically 3.3-4.5 mm millimeters in length and have tan or dark brown coloring.

== Species ==
The following species are recognized:

- Ebhul carinatus Funkhouser, 1915
- Ebhul elegans Funkhouser, 1929
- Ebhul formicarius Distant, 1916
- Ebhul maculipennis Funkhouser, 1922
- Ebhul notatus Funkhouser, 1927
- Ebhul tessellatus Distant, 1914
- Ebhul uniformis Funkhouser, 1927
- Ebhul varius Walker, 1858
