= Choucentrini =

Scientific classification
- Kingdom: Animalia
- Phylum: Arthropoda
- Clade: Pancrustacea
- Class: Insecta
- Order: Hemiptera
- Suborder: Auchenorrhyncha
- Family: Membracidae
- Subfamily: Centrotinae
- Tribe: Choucentrini; Yuan and Chou, 1988

Tribe of true bugs

Choucentrini is a monophyletic tribe of treehoppers in the subfamily Centrotinae. It was first described by Yuan and Chou in 1988, and contains 3 genera. The type genus of this tribe is Choucentrus

Individuals in this tribe are typically 5.3-6 millimeters in length and typically have brown or dark brown coloring. They are widespread throughout South and Southeast Asia.

== Genera ==
The following genera are recognized:

- Choucentrus Yuan, 1985
- Dograna Distant, 1908
- Evanchon Goding, 1930
