= Pieltainellini =

Scientific classification
- Kingdom: Animalia
- Phylum: Arthropoda
- Clade: Pancrustacea
- Class: Insecta
- Order: Hemiptera
- Suborder: Auchenorrhyncha
- Family: Membracidae
- Subfamily: Centrotinae
- Tribe: Pieltainellini; Wallace & Dietz, 2004

Tribe of true bugs

Pieltainellini is a tribe of treehoppers in the subfamily Centrotinae. It was first described by Matthew Wallace and Lewis Dietz in 2004, and contains 2 genera. The type genus of this tribe is Pieltainellus. Individuals in this tribe are typically 4.3-5.4 millimeters in length and have tan or dark brown coloring.

== Genera ==
The following genera are recognized:

- Pieltainellus Peláez, 1970
- Spathocentrus Fowler, 1896
