= Monobelini =

Scientific classification
- Kingdom: Animalia
- Phylum: Arthropoda
- Clade: Pancrustacea
- Class: Insecta
- Order: Hemiptera
- Suborder: Auchenorrhyncha
- Family: Membracidae
- Subfamily: Centrotinae
- Tribe: Monobelini; Wallace & Deitz, 2004

Tribe of true bugs

Monobelini is a tribe of treehoppers in the subfamily Centrotinae. It was first described by Matthew Wallace and Lewis Dietz in 2004, and contains genera found in the Caribbean. The type genus of this tribe is Monobelus. Individuals in this tribe are typically 2.0-4.8 millimeters in length and have black, tan, or dark brown coloring.

== Genera ==
The following genera are recognized:

1. Brachycentrotus Metcalf & Bruner, 1926
2. Braxtonota Dietrich, 2008
3. Monobeloides Ramos Alemar, 1979
4. Monobelus Stål, 1866
