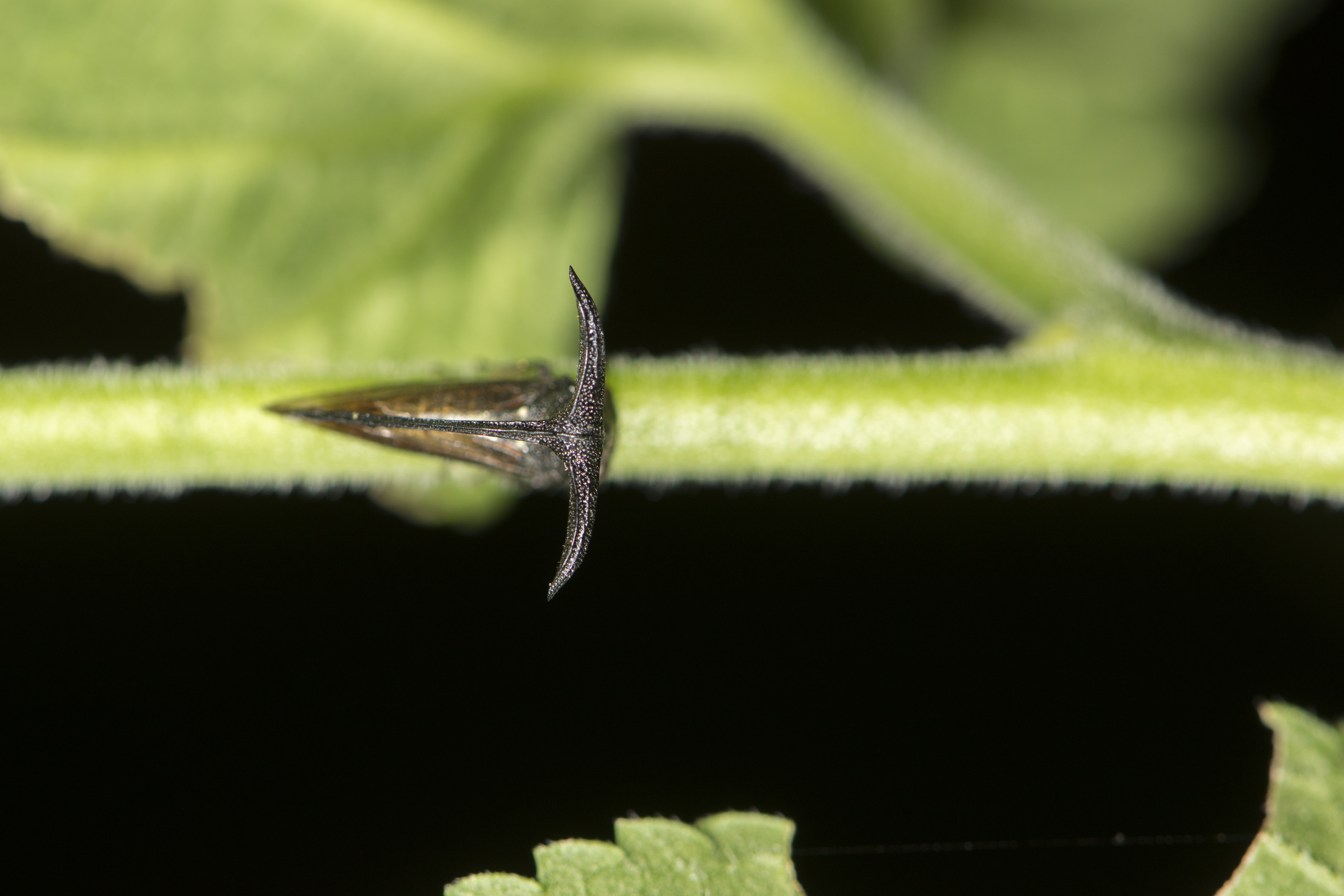
- Leptobelus sauteri

Scientific classification
- Kingdom: Animalia
- Phylum: Arthropoda
- Clade: Pancrustacea
- Class: Insecta
- Order: Hemiptera
- Suborder: Auchenorrhyncha
- Family: Membracidae
- Tribe: Leptobelini
- Genus: Leptobelus; Stål, 1866

= Leptobelus =

Tribe of true bugs

Leptobelus is a genus of Asian treehoppers in the subfamily Centrotinae. It was first described by Carl Stål in 1866, and is the only genus within the tribe Leptobelini.

== Description and distribution ==
Species in this genus have been recorded from China to Malesia and New Guinea (although Indochina records are probably incomplete); they are typically 5.3-6.7 mm millimeters in length and have black or dark brown.

== Species ==
The following species are recognized:

1. Leptobelus alticeps Walker, 1868
2. Leptobelus dama Germar, 1835
3. Leptobelus elevatus Funkhouser, 1921
4. Leptobelus gazella Fairmaire, 1847
5. Leptobelus metuendus Walker, 1857
6. Leptobelus nigris Funkhouser, 1929
7. Leptobelus sauteri Schumacher, 1915
