= Hermann Haupt =

German entomologist

Hermann Haupt (24 January 1873, in Langensalza, Unstrut-Hainich, Thuringia – 2 June 1959, in Halle, Saxony-Anhalt) was a German entomologist who worked mainly on Auchenorrhyncha and Hymenoptera.

He was an intermediate school (Mittelschule) teacher. He described many new species. Haupt’s Hymenoptera and Auchenorrhyncha collections are conserved in the University of Halle-Wittenberg (Geiseltalmuseum Halle) and Biozentum), Staatliches Museum für Tierkunde Dresden (Cicadidae) and Naturkundemuseum Erfurt (other Orders).
