= Arnold Jacobi =

German zoologist and ethnologist

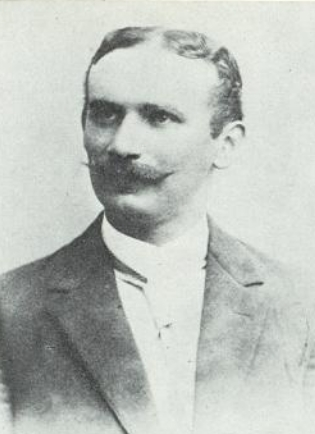

Arnold Friedrich Victor Jacobi (31 January 1870 – 16 June 1948) was a German zoologist and ethnologist who worked at the Forest Academy in Tharandt and later served as director of the Dresden Museum. He studied biogeography, described numerous taxa of molluscs and cicadas, and wrote on birds and mammals. He was a supporter of the Nazi regime.

Jacobi was born in Leipzig, where his father Victor was a professor of philosophy. His mother Flora was the daughter of a Pastor Heiner. He received his schooling at the Thomasschule in Leipzig and took an interest in zoology studying under Rudolf Leuckart and William Marshall as well as in geography, ethnography and anthropology. He also took an interest in Arabic and Russian languages. He received his doctorate on Malay land snails in 1895, after which he became a school teacher in Leipzig and later Stollberg. He became a scientific assistant in the health department in Berlin and then moved to a chair in zoology at the Forest Academy in Tharandt, succeeding H. Nitsche, becoming a full professor in 1904. In 1906 he was appointed to the Dresden museum as director to replace A. B. Meyer who was forced to resign partly on account of his Jewish origin. Jacobi held the position at the museum until retirement in 1936. He joined expeditions to Lapland in 1908 and the Kanin peninsula in 1913. He collected and described numerous taxa of insects (particularly the cicadas), birds, and other groups, while also taking an interest in biogeography. Jacobi signed the Vow of allegiance of the Professors of the German Universities and High-Schools to Adolf Hitler and the National Socialistic State in 1933, but there is no evidence that he became a party member.

Jacobi married Olga née Dolberg in 1902, and they had four children. Olga died in 1931, and in 1941 Jacobi married schoolteacher Hildegard née Bösch (1890–1965). Jacobi died in Dresden and is buried in Outer Plauen Cemetery.
