= Micreune =

Scientific classification
- Kingdom: Animalia
- Phylum: Arthropoda
- Clade: Pancrustacea
- Class: Insecta
- Order: Hemiptera
- Suborder: Auchenorrhyncha
- Family: Membracidae
- Subfamily: Centrotinae
- Tribe: Micreunini; Distant, 1908
- Genus: Micreune; Walker, 1857

Genus of true bugs

Micreune is a genus of treehoppers in the subfamily Centrotinae. It was first described by Francis Walker in 1857, and is the only genus within the tribe Micreunini. Individuals in this genus are typically around 7 mm millimeters in length and have black and white coloring.

== Species ==
The following species are recognized:

- Micreune cassis Buckton, 1901
- Micreune formidanda Walker, 1857
