= Nessorhinini =

Scientific classification
- Kingdom: Animalia
- Phylum: Arthropoda
- Clade: Pancrustacea
- Class: Insecta
- Order: Hemiptera
- Suborder: Auchenorrhyncha
- Family: Membracidae
- Subfamily: Centrotinae
- Tribe: Nessorhinini; Deitz, 1975

Tribe of true bugs

Nessorhinini is a tribe of treehoppers in the subfamily Centrotinae. It was first described by Lewis Dietz in 1975, and contains genera found in the Americas. The type genus of this tribe is Nessorhinus. Individuals in this tribe are typically 4.5-10 millimeters in length and have tan, dark brown, or dark blue coloring.

== Genera ==
The following genera are recognized:

1. Callicentrus Stål, 1870
2. Daimon (treehopper) Buckton, 1903
3. Goniolomus Stål, 1869
4. Marshallella Goding, 1927
5. Nessorhinus Amyot & Audinet-Serville, 1843
6. Orekthophora Funkhouser, 1930
7. Orthobelus Stål, 1869
8. Paradarnoides Fowler, 1894
9. Spathenotus Ramos Alemar, 1957
10. Spinodarnoides Funkhouser, 1930
