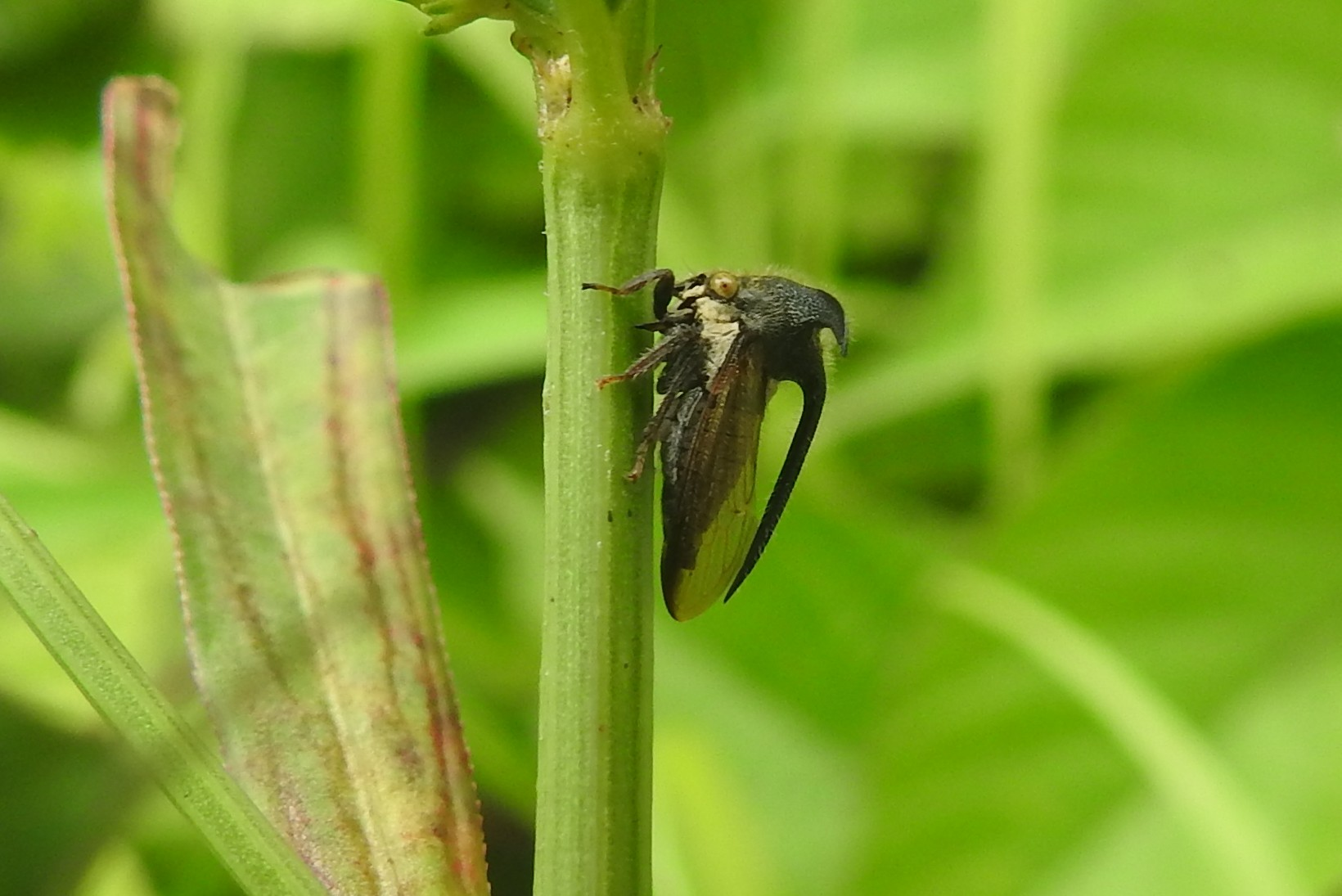
- Leptocentrus taurus

Scientific classification
- Kingdom: Animalia
- Phylum: Arthropoda
- Clade: Pancrustacea
- Class: Insecta
- Order: Hemiptera
- Suborder: Auchenorrhyncha
- Family: Membracidae
- Subfamily: Centrotinae
- Tribe: Leptocentrini; Distant, 1908

Synonyms
- Demangini Yuan & Zhang, 2002; Leptocentrina Distant, 1908; Uroxiphini Goding, 1930

= Leptocentrini =

Tribe of true bugs

Leptocentrini is a tribe of treehoppers in the subfamily Centrotinae. It was first described by William Lucas Distant in 1908, and contains genera mostly recorded from Africa, South, S.E. and N.E. Asia through to Australia. The type genus of this tribe is Leptocentrus.

== Description ==
Species in this tribe are typically 4.0-8.7 mm in length and are usually black, tan, or dark brown.

== Genera ==
The following genera are recognised::

1. Ananthasubramanianum McKamey, 1994
2. Awania Distant, 1914
3. Camelocentrus Chou, 1976
4. Dacaratha Distant, 1916
5. Demanga Distant, 1908
6. Joveriana Capener, 1968
7. Leptocentrus Stål, 1866
8. Leptoceps Capener, 1954
9. Neocentrus Thirumalai & Ananthasubramanian, 1981
10. Nilautama Distant, 1908
11. Occator (bug) Distant, 1916
12. Otinotus Buckton, 1903
13. Peltzerella Schmidt, 1926
14. Periaman Distant, 1908
15. Sinodemanga Chou & Yuan, 1982
16. Trioxiphus Boulard, 1979
17. Umfilianus Distant, 1915
18. Uroxiphus Amyot & Audinet-Serville, 1843
19. Yaponotus Capener, 1953
20. Zigzagicentrus Chou, 1976
