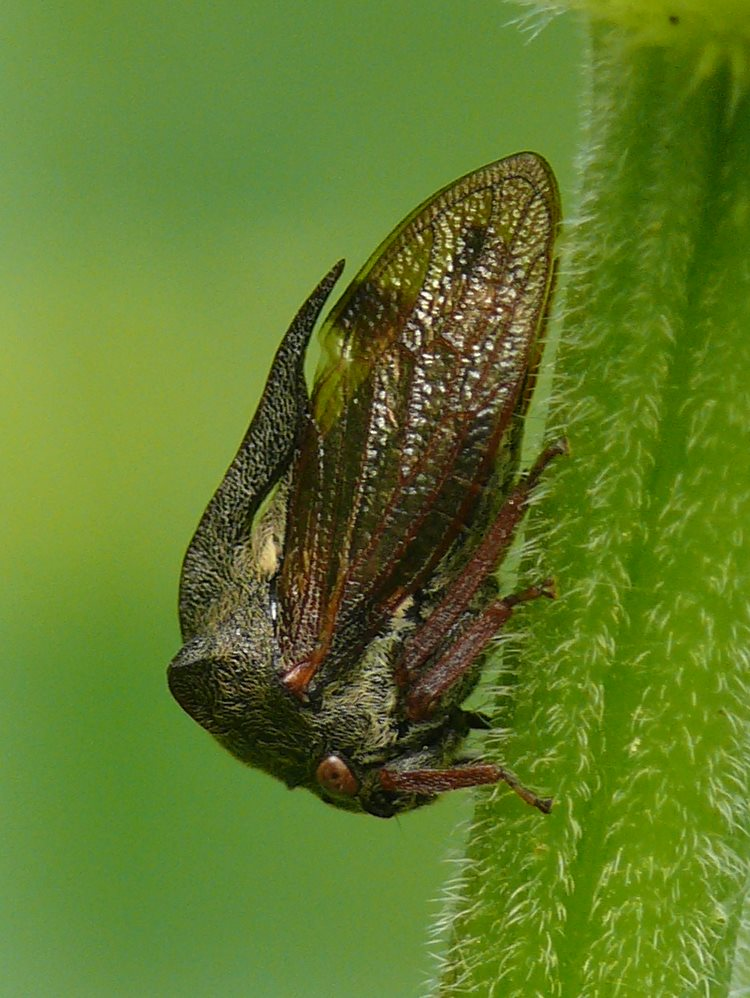
- Centrotus cornutus

Scientific classification
- Kingdom: Animalia
- Phylum: Arthropoda
- Clade: Pancrustacea
- Class: Insecta
- Order: Hemiptera
- Suborder: Auchenorrhyncha
- Family: Membracidae
- Subfamily: Centrotinae; Amyot & Serville, 1843

Type genus
- Centrotus Fabricius, 1803

= Centrotinae =

Subfamily of insects

Centrotinae is a subfamily within the treehoppers (Membracidae) and is the largest and only subfamily with a worldwide distribution of species. There are nearly 1350 species placed in 216 genera. Species in the genus make use of a wide range of host plants belonging to 105 plant families with dominant ones being Leguminosae, Compositae, Solanaceae, and Euphorbiaceae. Most species have relationships with ants that tend them for honeydew. The Centrotinae typically have the posterior pronotal process not concealing the scutellum and the forewing has the clavus truncated at the apex and having a broad apical limbus. Exceptions in which the scutellum are partly concealed can be found both in the New and Old World.

== Tribes and Genera ==
The subfamily Centrotinae includes 23 tribes and 11 basal genera. It also includes one species, Sinocentrus brevicornis that is not assigned to a genus.

=== Tribes ===
Centrotinae includes 23 tribes:

1. Beaufortianini Wallace & Deitz, 2004
2. Boccharini Wallace & Deitz, 2004
3. Boocerini Goding, 1892
4. Centrocharesini Goding, 1931
5. Centrodontini Deitz, 1975
6. Centrotini Amyot & Audinet-Serville, 1843
7. Centrotypini Haupt, 1929
8. Choucentrini Yuan, 1988
9. Ebhuloidesini Goding, 1931
10. Gargarini Distant, 1908
11. Hypsaucheniini Distant, 1908
12. Leptobelini Yuan, 2002
13. Leptocentrini Distant, 1908
14. Lobocentrini Wallace & Deitz, 2004
15. Maarbarini Wallace & Deitz, 2004
16. Micreunini Distant, 1908
17. Monobelini Wallace & Deitz, 2004
18. Nessorhinini Deitz, 1975
19. Oxyrhachini Distant, 1908
20. Pieltainellini Wallace & Deitz, 2004
21. Platycentrini Haupt, 1929
22. Terentiini Haupt, 1929
23. Xiphopoeini Capener, 1966

=== Genera ===
Centrotinae includes 11 genera that are not placed within a tribe.

1. Aspasiana Distant, 1916
2. Centrobelus Vilbaste, 1968
3. Elaphiceps Buckton, 1903
4. Insitor (treehopper) Distant, 1916
5. Insitoroides Funkhouser, 1933
6. Kaikaia Morris & Dietrich, 2020
7. Megalocentrus Yuan, 2002
8. Megaloschema (treehopper) Buckton, 1903
9. Selenacentrus Morris & Dietrich, 2016
10. Sinocentrus Yuan, 2002
11. Tyrannotus Capener, 1968
