= Tricentrus kriegeli =

Scientific classification
- Kingdom: Animalia
- Phylum: Arthropoda
- Clade: Pancrustacea
- Class: Insecta
- Order: Hemiptera
- Suborder: Auchenorrhyncha
- Family: Membracidae
- Genus: Tricentrus
- Species: T. kriegeli

Binomial name
- Tricentrus kriegeli Funkhouser, 1932

Species of insect

Tricentrus kriegeli is a species of treehoppers in the subfamily Centrotinae described by William Delbert Funkhouser in 1932. It is found on the island of Borneo.
