= Tricentrus attenuicornis =

Scientific classification
- Kingdom: Animalia
- Phylum: Arthropoda
- Clade: Pancrustacea
- Class: Insecta
- Order: Hemiptera
- Suborder: Auchenorrhyncha
- Family: Membracidae
- Genus: Tricentrus
- Species: T. attenuicornis

Binomial name
- Tricentrus attenuicornis Funkhouser, 1929

Species of insect

Tricentrus attenuicornis is a species of treehoppers in the subfamily Centrotinae described by William Delbert Funkhouser in 1929. It is found on the island of Borneo.

== Etymology ==
The species name attenuicornis comes from the Latin for "having thin horns".
