= Tricentrus aiyuri =

Scientific classification
- Kingdom: Animalia
- Phylum: Arthropoda
- Clade: Pancrustacea
- Class: Insecta
- Order: Hemiptera
- Suborder: Auchenorrhyncha
- Family: Membracidae
- Genus: Tricentrus
- Species: T. aiyuri

Binomial name
- Tricentrus aiyuri Funkhouser, 1933

Species of insect

Tricentrus aiyuri is a species of treehoppers in the subfamily Centrotinae described by William Delbert Funkhouser in 1933. It is found in southern India.
