= Tricentrus brunneus =

Scientific classification
- Kingdom: Animalia
- Phylum: Arthropoda
- Clade: Pancrustacea
- Class: Insecta
- Order: Hemiptera
- Suborder: Auchenorrhyncha
- Family: Membracidae
- Genus: Tricentrus
- Species: T. brunneus

Binomial name
- Tricentrus brunneus Funkhouser, 1918

Species of insect

Tricentrus brunneus is a species of treehoppers in the subfamily Centrotinae described by William Delbert Funkhouser in 1918. It is found in East and Southeast Asia.

== Etymology ==
The species name brunneus comes from the Latin for "brown".
