= Tricentrus altidorsus =

Scientific classification
- Kingdom: Animalia
- Phylum: Arthropoda
- Clade: Pancrustacea
- Class: Insecta
- Order: Hemiptera
- Suborder: Auchenorrhyncha
- Family: Membracidae
- Genus: Tricentrus
- Species: T. altidorsus

Binomial name
- Tricentrus altidorsus Funkhouser, 1929

Species of insect

Tricentrus altidorsus is a species of treehoppers in the subfamily Centrotinae described by William Delbert Funkhouser in 1929. It is found in Indonesia and Malaysia.
