= Tricentrus luteus =

Scientific classification
- Kingdom: Animalia
- Phylum: Arthropoda
- Clade: Pancrustacea
- Class: Insecta
- Order: Hemiptera
- Suborder: Auchenorrhyncha
- Family: Membracidae
- Genus: Tricentrus
- Species: T. luteus

Binomial name
- Tricentrus luteus Funkhouser, 1918

Synonyms
- Centrotoscelus luteus Funkhouser, 1918

Species of insect

Tricentrus luteus is a species of treehoppers in the subfamily Centrotinae described by William Delbert Funkhouser in 1918. It is found in The Philippines.

== Etymology ==
The species name luteus comes from the Latin for "yellow".
