= Tricentrus latus =

Scientific classification
- Kingdom: Animalia
- Phylum: Arthropoda
- Clade: Pancrustacea
- Class: Insecta
- Order: Hemiptera
- Suborder: Auchenorrhyncha
- Family: Membracidae
- Genus: Tricentrus
- Species: T. latus

Binomial name
- Tricentrus latus Funkhouser, 1927

Synonyms
- Otaris lata Goding, 1934

Species of insect

Tricentrus latus is a species of treehoppers in the subfamily Centrotinae described by William Delbert Funkhouser in 1927. It is found in Indonesia.

== Etymology ==
The species name latus comes from the Latin for "wide" or "broad".
