= Tricentrus laticornis =

Scientific classification
- Kingdom: Animalia
- Phylum: Arthropoda
- Clade: Pancrustacea
- Class: Insecta
- Order: Hemiptera
- Suborder: Auchenorrhyncha
- Family: Membracidae
- Genus: Tricentrus
- Species: T. laticornis

Binomial name
- Tricentrus laticornis Funkhouser, 1918

Species of insect

Tricentrus laticornis is a species of treehoppers in the subfamily Centrotinae described by William Delbert Funkhouser in 1918. It is found in The Philippines.

== Etymology ==
The species name laticornis comes from the Latin for "having wide horns".
