= Tricentrus bergeri =

Scientific classification
- Kingdom: Animalia
- Phylum: Arthropoda
- Clade: Pancrustacea
- Class: Insecta
- Order: Hemiptera
- Suborder: Auchenorrhyncha
- Family: Membracidae
- Genus: Tricentrus
- Species: T. bergeri

Binomial name
- Tricentrus bergeri Funkhouser, 1927

Species of insect

Tricentrus bergeri is a species of treehoppers in the subfamily Centrotinae described by William Delbert Funkhouser in 1927. It is found in China and Mongolia.

== Etymology ==
The species name bergeri is in honor of M. L. Berger.
