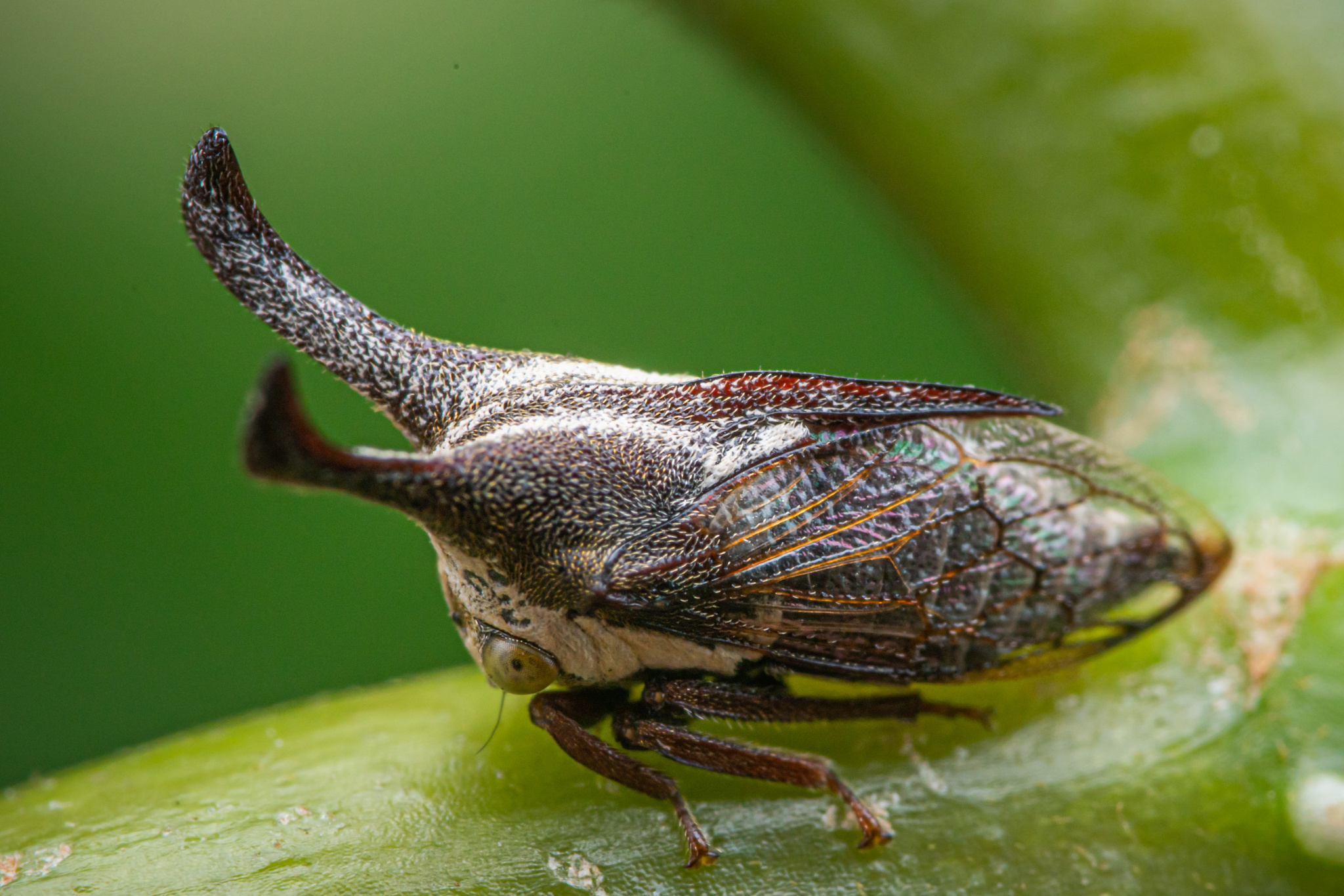
- Tricentrus convergens

Scientific classification
- Kingdom: Animalia
- Phylum: Arthropoda
- Clade: Pancrustacea
- Class: Insecta
- Order: Hemiptera
- Suborder: Auchenorrhyncha
- Family: Membracidae
- Subfamily: Centrotinae
- Tribe: Gargarini
- Genus: Tricentrus; Stål, 1866

Synonyms
- Arisangargara Kato, 1928; Centrotoscelus Funkhouser, 1914; Otaris Buckton, 1903; Taloipa Buckton, 1905; (also various mis-spellings)

= Tricentrus =

Genus of true bugs

Tricentrus is a genus of tree-hoppers in the tribe Gargarini, erected by Carl Stål in 1866. Species have been recorded from India, China, Japan, South-east Asia and Australia.

== Taxonomy ==
The name Tricentrus is derived from the Greek: τρι- (three) and κέντρον (sharp points), which describes the general appearance of insects; the type species T. fairmairei having originally been placed in the genus Centrotus by Stål. The genus is distinguished from others such as Gargara and species are generally identified by the shape of the fronto-clypeus, with characteristics in the male genitalia and subgenital plate also used.

== Species ==
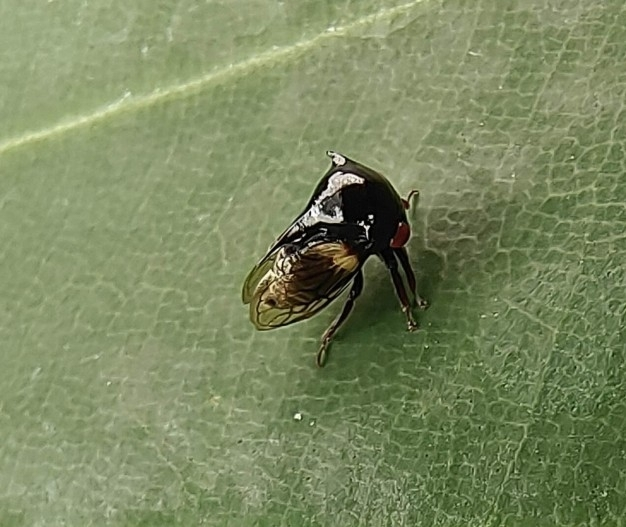
Tricentrus fulgidus

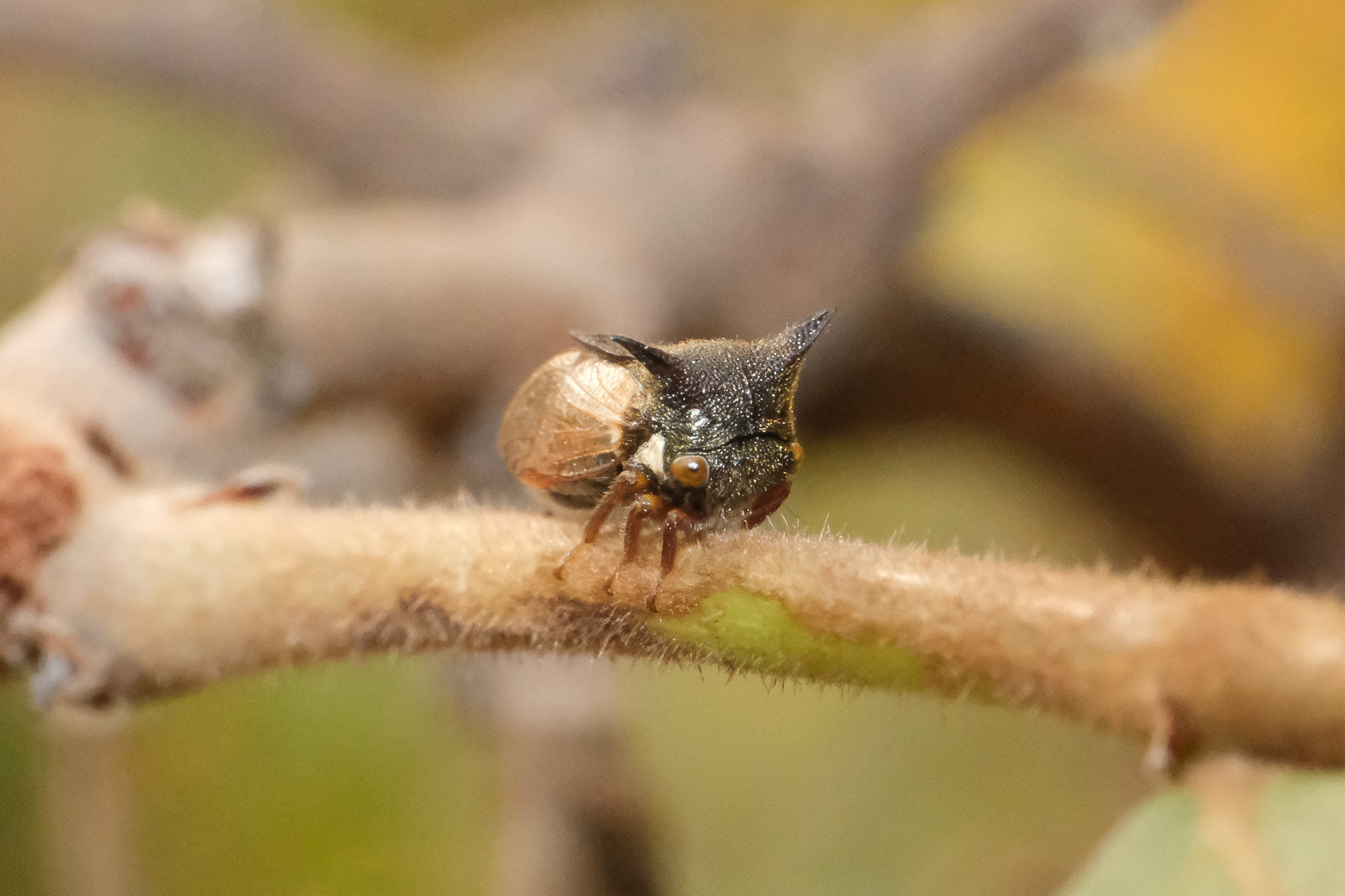
Tricentrus pieli

The genus Tricentrus includes the following species:

- Tricentrus acer (Walker, 1858)
- Tricentrus acuticornis Funkhouser
- Tricentrus acutiformis Yasmeen & Ahmad, 1976
- Tricentrus aeneus Distant, 1916
- Tricentrus aequicornis Funkhouser, 1927
- Tricentrus aiyuri Funkhouser, 1933
- Tricentrus albescens Funkhouser, 1929 (not T. allabens Distant)
- Tricentrus albipennis Kato, 1930
- Tricentrus albipes Funkhouser, 1927
- Tricentrus albomaculatus Distant, 1908
- Tricentrus aleuritis Chou, 1975
- Tricentrus altidorsus Funkhouser, 1929
- Tricentrus amplicornis Funkhouser, 1937
- Tricentrus amurensis Lindberg, 1927
- Tricentrus ananthasubramaniani Sharma & Badan, 1986
- Tricentrus angularis Yasmeen & Ahmad, 1976
- Tricentrus assamensiformis Yasmeen & Ahmad, 1976
- Tricentrus assamensis Distant, 1908
- Tricentrus atrus Ananthasubramanian, 1980
- Tricentrus attenuatus Funkhouser, 1915
- Tricentrus attenuicornis Funkhouser, 1929
- Tricentrus auritus (Buckton, 1903)
- Tricentrus bakeri Funkhouser, 1929
- Tricentrus banguensis Funkhouser
- Tricentrus basalis Walker
- Tricentrus bengalensis Yasmeen & Ahmad, 1976
- Tricentrus bergeri Funkhouser, 1927
- Tricentrus bicolor Distant, 1908
- Tricentrus bicoloratus Yasmeen & Ahmad, 1976
- Tricentrus bifasciatus Jacobi, 1944
- Tricentrus biformis Kato, 1930
- Tricentrus bifurcus Distant
- Tricentrus borneensis Funkhouser
- Tricentrus bovillus Distant
- Tricentrus brevicornis Funkhouser
- Tricentrus brevis Funkhouser
- Tricentrus brevispinis Funkhouser, 1920
- Tricentrus brunneicornis Funkhouser, 1929
- Tricentrus brunneifasciata Funkhouser, 1938
- Tricentrus brunneifasciataus (Funkhouser, 1938)
- Tricentrus brunneus Funkhouser, 1918
- Tricentrus bucktoni Ahmad & Yasmeen, 1979
- Tricentrus caliginosus Walker, 1857
- Tricentrus camelliae Yuan & Fan
- Tricentrus camelloleifer Yuan & Cui
- Tricentrus capneri Yasmeen & Ahmad, 1976
- Tricentrus carinatus Funkhouser, 1937
- Tricentrus cassiae Yuan & Xu, 1997
- Tricentrus castaneipes Kato, 1940
- Tricentrus cinereus Ananthasubramanian, 1980
- Tricentrus colligatoclypei Yuan & Cui, 1987
- Tricentrus colligatoclypeides Yuan & Cui
- Tricentrus compressus Ananthasubramanian, 1980
- Tricentrus concavus Funkhouser
- Tricentrus concolor Ananthasubramanian, 1996
- Tricentrus congestus Walker, 1870
- Tricentrus convergens Walker
- Tricentrus coreanus Kato, 1940
- Tricentrus coriariae Yuan & Fan
- Tricentrus cornutus Ananthasubramanian, 1980
- Tricentrus curvicornis Funkhouser, 1927
- Tricentrus curvispinatus Yuan & Cui, 1987
- Tricentrus decornis Ananthasubramanian & Ananthakrishnan, 1975
- Tricentrus decurvatus Funkhouser
- Tricentrus depressicornis Funkhouser, 1935
- Tricentrus depressispinis Yasmeen & Ahmad, 1978
- Tricentrus distinctus Thirumalai & Ananthasubramanian, 1985
- Tricentrus divergens Bierman
- Tricentrus dorsocameloideus X.
- Tricentrus dubitatus Liang & McKamey, 1995
- Tricentrus dubius Kato, 1960
- Tricentrus dyaki Funkhouser, 1937
- Tricentrus elaeagni Yuan & Fan
- Tricentrus elegans Ananthasubramanian, 1980
- Tricentrus elongatus Kato, 1929
- Tricentrus erectus Thirumalai, 1986
- Tricentrus euschistus Distant
- Tricentrus fairmairei Stål - type species
- Tricentrus fasciatus Kato, 1928
- Tricentrus fasciipennis Funkhouser
- Tricentrus femellacornis Kato, 1940
- Tricentrus femoratus Walker, 1870
- Tricentrus ferrugineus Walker, 1870
- Tricentrus ferruginosus Funkhouser, 1929
- Tricentrus finitimus Walker
- Tricentrus flava Kato, 1928
- Tricentrus flavipes Melichar
- Tricentrus floripinnae Yuan & Cui, 1987
- Tricentrus foliocornatus Yuan & Fan, 2002
- Tricentrus forticornis Funkhouser, 1929
- Tricentrus fukienensis Funkhouser, 1935
- Tricentrus fulgidus Funkhouser, 1929
- Tricentrus funkhouseri Yasmeen & Ahmad, 1976
- Tricentrus fuscoapicalis Kato, 1928
- Tricentrus fuscolimbatus Kato, 1928
- Tricentrus gammamaculatus Yuan & Cui
- Tricentrus garampina Matsumura
- Tricentrus gargaraformae Chou & Yuan
- Tricentrus gargaraformis Kato, 1928
- Tricentrus gibbiformis Ahmad & Yasmeen, 1979
- Tricentrus gibbosulus Walker, 1858
- Tricentrus glochidionae Kato, 1930
- Tricentrus gracilicornis Kato, 1928
- Tricentrus gracilis Kato, 1930
- Tricentrus gyirongensis Yuan & Cui, 1987
- Tricentrus hameedi Ananthasubramanian, 1996
- Tricentrus handschini Funkhouser, 1936
- Tricentrus horizontalis Distant
- Tricentrus hyalinipennis Kato, 1928
- Tricentrus hyalopterus Chou & Yuan
- Tricentrus intermedius Schmidt
- Tricentrus ismaili Yasmeen & Ahmad, 1978
- Tricentrus kamaonensis Distant
- Tricentrus kashmirensis Ahmad & Yasmeen, 1979
- Tricentrus kodaikanalensis Liang & McKamey, 1995
- Tricentrus koshunensis Matsumura
- Tricentrus kotoinsulanus Kato, 1928
- Tricentrus kotonis Matsumura, 1938
- Tricentrus kriegeli Funkhouser, 1932
- Tricentrus kuyanianus Matsumura
- Tricentrus laticornis Funkhouser
- Tricentrus latiformis Yasmeen & Ahmad, 1976
- Tricentrus latus Funkhouser, 1927
- Tricentrus lindbergi Jacobi, 1944
- Tricentrus longiceps Ananthasubramanian, 1980
- Tricentrus longicornis Ananthasubramanian, 1980
- Tricentrus longimarginis Yuan & Cui
- Tricentrus ludingensis Yuan & Cui
- Tricentrus luteus Funkhouser
- Tricentrus maacki Funkhouser, 1927
- Tricentrus maculatus Funkhouser, 1938
- Tricentrus maculipennis Funkhouser, 1933
- Tricentrus manilaensis Funkhouser, 1927
- Tricentrus marginata Kato, 1928
- Tricentrus matsumurai Kato, 1930
- Tricentrus mckameyi Ahmad, 1992
- Tricentrus medogensis Yuan & Cui, 1987
- Tricentrus megaloplasius Chou & Yuan
- Tricentrus melichari Ahmad, 1992
- Tricentrus minicornis Yasmeen & Ahmad, 1976
- Tricentrus minimus Ahmad & Yasmeen, 1979
- Tricentrus minomorii Ananthasubramanian, 1980
- Tricentrus minor Schmidt
- Tricentrus minullus Jacobi, 1944
- Tricentrus minusculus Ananthasubramanian, 1980
- Tricentrus minuticornis Kato, 1928
- Tricentrus minutus Funkhouser, 1936
- Tricentrus murreeana Ahmad & Yasmeen, 1976
- Tricentrus mushaensis Kato, 1928
- Tricentrus naifunpoensis Kato, 1930
- Tricentrus neofulgidus Yuan & Cui
- Tricentrus neokamaonensis Yasmeen & Ahmad, 1976
- Tricentrus neoplanicornis Yuan
- Tricentrus niger (Kato, 1928)
- Tricentrus nigra Kato, 1928
- Tricentrus nigrifrons Kato, 1928
- Tricentrus nigris Funkhouser
- Tricentrus nigritus Liang & McKamey, 1995
- Tricentrus nigroapicalis Funkhouser, 1927
- Tricentrus nigrofrontis Funkhouser, 1929
- Tricentrus nitidus Funkhouser, 1927
- Tricentrus nivis Funkhouser, 1932
- Tricentrus nobilis Ananthasubramanian, 1980
- Tricentrus nordicornis Yasmeen & Ahmad, 1976
- Tricentrus obesus Funkhouser, 1942
- Tricentrus oedothorectoidis Yuan & Fan, 2002
- Tricentrus oedothorectus Yuan & Cui, 1987
- Tricentrus okamotoi Kato, 1930
- Tricentrus orientalis Funkhouser, 1935
- Tricentrus ornatus Funkhouser, 1938
- Tricentrus pallidus Walker
- Tricentrus pallipes Kato, 1928
- Tricentrus panayensis Funkhouser, 1927
- Tricentrus papuaensis Funkhouser, 1929
- Tricentrus pieli Funkhouser, 1934
- Tricentrus pilinervosus Funkhouser
- Tricentrus pilosis Funkhouser, 1932
- Tricentrus pilosus Ananthasubramanian & Ananthakrishnan, 1975
- Tricentrus planicornis Jacobi, 1944
- Tricentrus platycornis Ananthasubramanian, 1980
- Tricentrus plicatus Funkhouser
- Tricentrus porrectus Funkhouser, 1929
- Tricentrus projectus Distant, 1908
- Tricentrus pronus Distant
- Tricentrus pseudobifurcus Ahmad & Yasmeen, 1979
- Tricentrus pseudocornis Funkhouser
- Tricentrus pubescens Funkhouser, 1929
- Tricentrus puerarianus Kato, 1937
- Tricentrus punjabensis Yasmeen & Ahmad, 1976
- Tricentrus purpureus Funkhouser, 1942
- Tricentrus qadrii Yasmeen & Ahmad, 1976
- Tricentrus quernales Chou & Yuan
- Tricentrus recurvicornis Ananthasubramanian, 1980
- Tricentrus repandus Distant
- Tricentrus resectus Distant
- Tricentrus robustiformis Yasmeen & Ahmad, 1976
- Tricentrus robustus Funkhouser
- Tricentrus rufipennis Funkhouser, 1935
- Tricentrus russellae Ahmad & Yasmeen, 1979
- Tricentrus samai Funkhouser, 1937
- Tricentrus selenus Buckton
- Tricentrus semipellucidus Yuan & Cui
- Tricentrus shinchikuna Kato, 1928
- Tricentrus sinuaticornis Yasmeen & Ahmad, 1976
- Tricentrus sinuatus Yasmeen & Ahmad, 1976
- Tricentrus sipyliformis Ahmad & Yasmeen, 1976
- Tricentrus sissoo Sharma & Badan, 1986
- Tricentrus solitarius Ahmad & Yasmeen, 1979
- Tricentrus spathodei Ananthasubramanian, 1982
- Tricentrus speciosus Thirumalai & Ananthasubramanian, 1985
- Tricentrus spinicornis Funkhouser
- Tricentrus spinidorsis Funkhouser, 1929
- Tricentrus spininervis Funkhouser, 1927
- Tricentrus spinis Funkhouser, 1935
- Tricentrus struempeli Ahmad & Yasmeen, 1979
- Tricentrus subangulatus Distant, 1908
- Tricentrus substitutus Dmitriev & Deitz, 2017
- Tricentrus suluensis Funkhouser, 1929
- Tricentrus sumatranus Schmidt, 1926
- Tricentrus syrandrikae Thirumalai & Ananthasubramanian, 1981
- Tricentrus taipinensis Kato, 1928
- Tricentrus taiwanensis Liang & McKamey, 1995
- Tricentrus takaoensis Kato, 1930
- Tricentrus takishimai Kato, 1940
- Tricentrus taurus Funkhouser, 1942
- Tricentrus transversus Distant, 1908
- Tricentrus truncaticornis Funkhouser
- Tricentrus typus Funkhouser
- Tricentrus umesaoi Ishihara, 1961
- Tricentrus unicolor Ananthasubramanian, 1980
- Tricentrus variabilis Ahmad & Yasmeen, 1979
- Tricentrus varicornis Ananthasubramanian, 1980
- Tricentrus verrucus Kato, 1940
- Tricentrus walkeri Metcalf & Wade, 1965
- Tricentrus xiphistes Kato, 1928
- Tricentrus yagoi Kato, 1940
- Tricentrus yasmeeni Liang & McKamey, 1995
