= Tricentrus borneensis =

Scientific classification
- Kingdom: Animalia
- Phylum: Arthropoda
- Clade: Pancrustacea
- Class: Insecta
- Order: Hemiptera
- Suborder: Auchenorrhyncha
- Family: Membracidae
- Genus: Tricentrus
- Species: T. borneensis

Binomial name
- Tricentrus borneensis Funkhouser, 1920

Species of insect

Tricentrus borneensis is a species of treehoppers in the subfamily Centrotinae described by William Delbert Funkhouser in 1920. It is found on the island of Borneo.

== Etymology ==
The species name borneensis is given in reference to the island of Borneo.
