= Tricentrus attenuatus =

Scientific classification
- Kingdom: Animalia
- Phylum: Arthropoda
- Clade: Pancrustacea
- Class: Insecta
- Order: Hemiptera
- Suborder: Auchenorrhyncha
- Family: Membracidae
- Genus: Tricentrus
- Species: T. attenuatus

Binomial name
- Tricentrus attenuatus Funkhouser, 1915

Species of insect

Tricentrus attenuatus is a species of treehoppers in the subfamily Centrotinae described by William Delbert Funkhouser in 1915. It is found in Indonesia, Malaysia, and The Philippines.
