= Tricentrus amplicornis =

Scientific classification
- Kingdom: Animalia
- Phylum: Arthropoda
- Clade: Pancrustacea
- Class: Insecta
- Order: Hemiptera
- Suborder: Auchenorrhyncha
- Family: Membracidae
- Genus: Tricentrus
- Species: T. amplicornis

Binomial name
- Tricentrus amplicornis Funkhouser, 1937

Species of insect

Tricentrus amplicornis is a species of treehoppers in the subfamily Centrotinae described by William Delbert Funkhouser in 1937. It is found in Vietnam with a believed distribution throughout Southeast Asia.

== Etymology ==
The species name amplicornis comes from the Latin for "having large horns".
