= Tricentrus albescens =

Scientific classification
- Kingdom: Animalia
- Phylum: Arthropoda
- Clade: Pancrustacea
- Class: Insecta
- Order: Hemiptera
- Suborder: Auchenorrhyncha
- Family: Membracidae
- Genus: Tricentrus
- Species: T. albescens

Binomial name
- Tricentrus albescens Funkhouser, 1929

Synonyms
- Tricentrus allabens Funkhouser, 1920

Species of insect

Tricentrus albescens is a species of treehoppers in the subfamily Centrotinae described by William Delbert Funkhouser in 1929. It is found in Indonesia and Malaysia.
