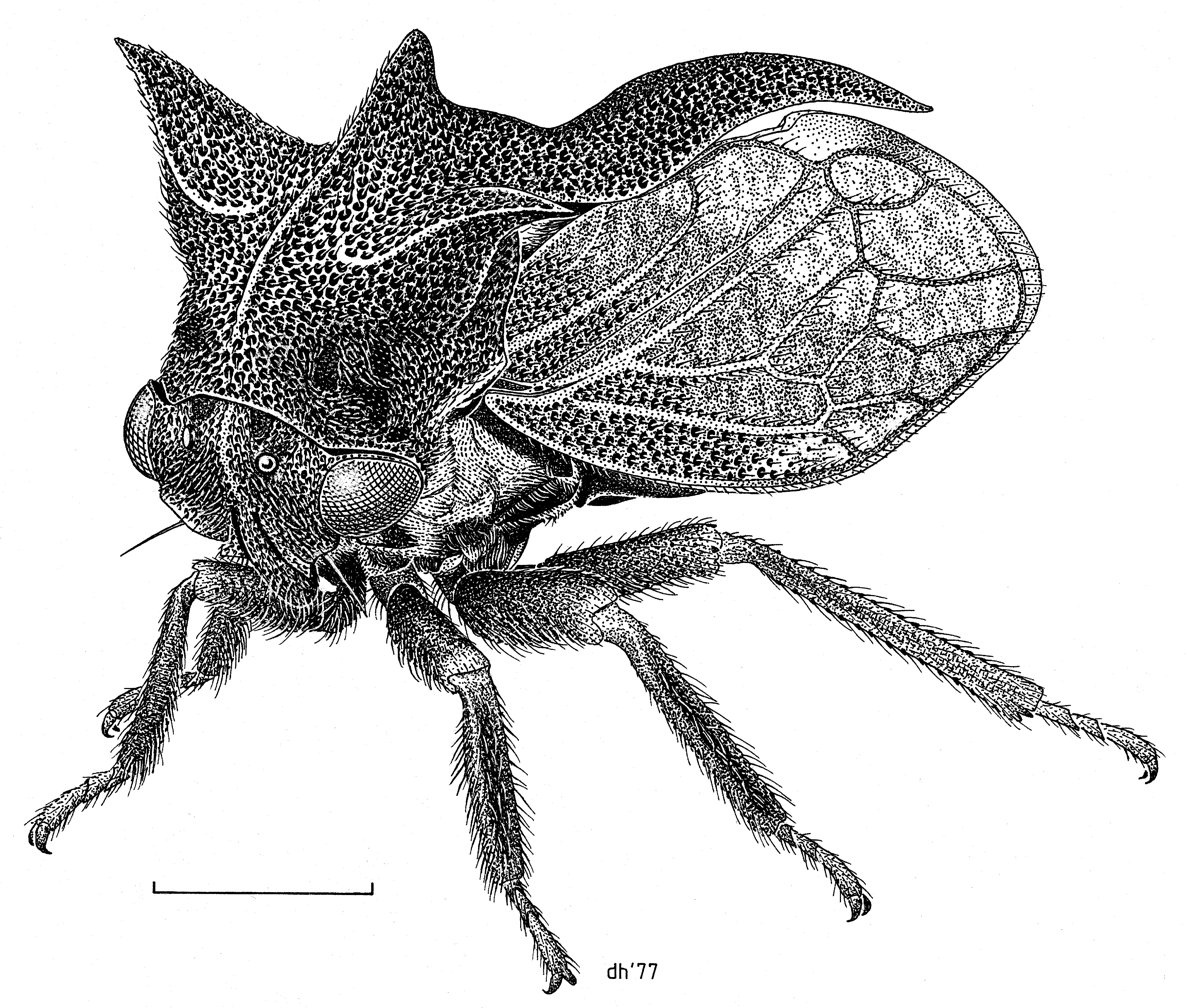
- Acanthuchus trispinifer

Scientific classification
- Kingdom: Animalia
- Phylum: Arthropoda
- Clade: Pancrustacea
- Class: Insecta
- Order: Hemiptera
- Suborder: Auchenorrhyncha
- Family: Membracidae
- Subfamily: Centrotinae
- Tribe: Terentiini; Haupt, 1929

Synonyms
- Bolbauchenini Goding, 1931; Bulbaucheniini Goding, 1931; Funkhouserellini Yuan & Zhang, 2002

= Terentiini =

Tribe of true bugs

Terentiini is a tribe of treehoppers in the subfamily Centrotinae, first described by Hermann Haupt in 1929. As of 2026 the tribe contains 41 genera found mostly in eastern Asia through to Australia. The type genus of this tribe is Terentius.

== Description ==
Individuals in this tribe are typically 2.6-8 millimeters in length and may be black, dark brown, light green, or light yellow.

== Genera ==
The following genera are recognized:

- Acanthucalis Evans, 1966
- Acanthuchus Stål, 1866
- Alocanthella Evans, 1966
- Alocebes Evans, 1966
- Alosextius Evans, 1966
- Anzac Distant, 1916
- Arimanes Distant, 1916
- Bucktoniella Evans, 1966
- Bulbauchenia Schumacher, 1915
- Bunyella Day, 1999
- Cebes Distant, 1916
- Ceraon Buckton, 1903
- Crito Distant, 1916
- Daymfus Özdikmen & Demir, 2010
- Dingkana Goding, 1903
- Eufairmairia Distant, 1916
- Eufairmairiella Evans, 1966
- Eufrenchia Goding, 1903
- Eutryonia Goding, 1903
- Evansiana McKamey, 1994
- Funkhouserella Schmidt, 1926
- Goddefroyinella Distant, 1916
- Lubra Goding, 1903
- Matumuia Day, 1999
- Neocanthuchus Day, 1999
- Neosextius Day, 1999
- Otinotoides Distant, 1916
- Pogonella Evans, 1966
- Pogonotypellus Evans, 1966
- Polonius Distant, 1916
- Protinotus Day, 1999
- Pyrgonota Stål, 1870
- Rentzia Day, 1999
- Rigula Day, 1999
- Sarantus Stål, 1864
- Sertorius Stål, 1866
- Sextius Stål, 1866
- Terentius Stål, 1866
- Undarella Day, 1999
- Wallaciana Evangelista, 2021
- Yangupia Day, 1999
