= Vaga (Tunisia) =

Coordinates: 36.7333°N 9.1833°E

Vaga, Vecca and lately Theodorias is an ancient city in Tunisia built by the Berbers and ruled sequentially by the Carthaginians, the Numidians, the Romans, the Vandals and the Byzantines until it was captured by the Arabs who changed its name to the present day Béja. The town was the capital of the Numidian Kingdom during the rule of Jugurtha.

== The origins of the city and the Phoenician rule ==
Little is known about the date of the foundation of Vaga, but it was certainly before the foundation of Carthage. The site of the current city was inhabited by Berber tribes, notably the Avrigha tribe, and when the Phoenicians started building trading posts throughout the country, Vaga was one of them. After that, Carthage, fortified the city with a fortress and put a garrison in it to strengthen its presence in the region,

=== Vaga through the First and Second Punic Wars ===
The city played an important role in the First Punic War because of its strong fortifications that stopped the Roman consul and general Marcus Atilius Regulus in his attempt to conquer the Carthaginian cities in the region. This was without doubt a decisive factor in the failure of the Africa campaign that Regulus led and later his capture. Despite this, Carthage lost the war. The loyalty of Vaga to Carthage continued during the Second Punic War, as in 218 BC the city sent a strong contingent to the army of Hannibal in Iberia to help him in his preparations to invade Italy. And in 201 BC, Vaga resisted an attack from the Numidian king Massinissa who was en route to Carthage to join the troops of Scipio Africanus.
To reward him for standing with her in the war against Carthage, Rome gave to Massinissa the ancient provinces of his ancient rival Syphax within them the territories of Vaga, but the town stayed under the rule of the Carthaginians who maintained a strong garrison in it.

=== The Third Punic War ===
In 146 BC, the Third Punic War ends, Carthage is burned by the Roman general Scipio Aemilianus. The ancient Carthaginian territories become the Roman province of Africa, and Vaga finally falls into the hands of the Numidian Kingdom. It was before a de jure Numidian territory and came officially under Numidian rule.

== Vaga before and during the Jugurthine War ==
=== Vaga, city of Roman influence and Jugurthine affiliation ===
==== The Roman influence ====
While the city was in the hands of the Numidians, Vaga still had some independence but under the surveillance of the Roman consuls who controlled Carthage.
After the period of peace that followed the Third Punic War and the annihilation of the Carthaginian power, Rome began a campaign of peaceful assimilation of her new province of Africa and its environs. Among her methods in this assimilation was sending colonists and even merchants to implant the Roman civilization and the use of the Latin language in African soil. Vaga was one of the targets, where many colonists and merchants settled, thus increasing the number of Roman citizens living in the city.

==== Vaga: Capital of Jugurtha ====
In 118 BC, Micipsa, the king of Numidia and son of Massinissa died, and the Kingdom was shared by his two sons Hiempsal, Adherbal and their half-brother Jugurtha.
Jugurtha took the eastern parts of the kingdom and established his government in the city of Vaga, but he wasn't pleased with this situation; he didn't want to see his nation divided in this way, so he assassinated Hiempsal, but he failed to kill Adherbal who escaped to Rome and gained the protection of the Roman Senate which divided the kingdom between him and Jugurtha. Wanting to reign alone, Jugurtha brought together an army in Vaga and started a war against his half-brother Adherbal. The latter was besieged in Cirta, where he was massacred with his partisans by Jugurtha in 112 BC. Rome used this action as a casus belli to declare on Jugurtha.

=== The Jugurthine War and the fall to the Romans ===
The Jugurthine War battle ground

The army of Jugurtha wasn't ready to face the mighty Roman Army, so he used his gold to bribe the Roman consul Lucius Calpurnius Bestia who signed a peace agreement with the Numidian king in 111 BC, and even sent his quaestor Sextius as an hostage to Vaga.
But the Roman senate refused to ratify this agreement and sent the Praetor Cassius to Vaga to provide him with safe-conduct to Rome to give witness before the Senate against the bribed Consul, and in 109 BC "redeclared" war on the Numidian Kingdom But this time, Jughurtha was prepared to it.
Jugurtha instead of defending his capital Vaga, abandoned it, in a tactic to attract the Roman army to the inland and to destroy it there. But the Roman general and consul Quintus Caecilius Metellus who led the war against Jugurtha didn't fall into this trap. He captured the city and fortified it and installed a garrison in it. The inhabitants of Vaga quickly accepted the Roman dominance, and with the presence of the Roman soldiers the city flourished, trade increased and well-being ruled.
When Jugurtha returned to take back his ex-capital, he found it had become too hard to take by military force, so he used ancient tricks (bribes, promises, threats..) and he managed to find a way to massacre the Roman garrison of the city.

==== The massacre of the Roman garrison and the destruction of the city ====
The nobles of Vaga agreed with Jugurtha to kill all the Roman soldiers who were in the city and made a plan for this operation; the massacre would take place at a famous festival night.
On the night of the festival all the military tribunes and commanders were invited to the feast, and all them were killed except one, Titus Turpilius Silanus, who would later be executed for treason. The soldiers who were sauntering through the city without arms were also massacred. Some of the soldiers tried to escape to the citadel to protect themselves but they found an enemy troop waiting for them. Even the women and kids participated in attacking the Roman soldiers with rocks; all the garrison was massacred.
Consul Metellus who was at that time in Hippo Diarrhytus (Bizerte), was shocked by the news coming from Vaga and didn't let anyone see him for days. And then he decided to avenge his soldiers. He took a legion and all possible Numidian cavalry and set out for Vaga. On his approach to the town, the inhabitants closed the gates thinking it was the army of Metellus, which was true, but seeing the Numidian horse at the front of the army they thought that the army was, in fact, Numidian, and opened the gates. Some of the townspeople went out to meet them, At that moment Metellus gave the sign to the cavalry and infantry to encircle the crowd and to massacre them. The rest of inhabitants who remained inside the city took positions at the gates and towers to defend her. After three days of resistance, the city fell; the adult males were killed, the rest sold into slavery and the town burned.

Everything, in this great and rich city, was delivered to the massacre and pillage.

— Gaius Sallustius Crispus, Bellum Iugurthinum

== The revival of the city under Roman dominance ==
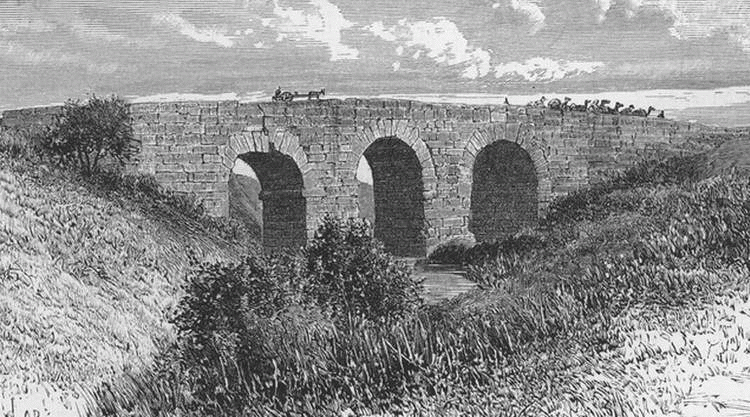
The Trajan Bridge

In 46 BC and after the defeat of Jugurtha, Rome recommenced its campaign of expansion on African soil, and what was known as Eastern Numidia or Massylii became the Roman province of Africa Nova. Vaga due to its strategic position received a permanent garrison and become part of the newly formed province.
In 14 BC, the Romans demolished the old Carthaginian citadel and built a new one on its ruins and also built fortifications. Besides these two works, they erected many other monuments some of which still exist today.

In 105 BC under the rule of the emperor Trajan, the Romans began the building of the bridge near Vaga.  Constructions lasted nearly 25 years and ended only under the reign of Emperor Hadrian and became known as the Trajan bridge.

Vaga, still flourishing, was promoted by Emperor Septimius Severus to the rank of Roman colonia under the name of Colonia Septimia Vaga. The city continued its prosperity for nearly two centuries till the Vandal invasion of Africa.

== The Vandal destruction and the transform to Theodorias ==
=== The Vandal attack ===
The Vandals in 429 and under the leadership of Genseric stormed the Roman province of Africa and made it in 435 as their new kingdom, in their route they destroyed several cities, within them Vaga which was devastated. In 442, the Western Roman Emperor Valentinian III made peace with the Vandals giving them the land between the sea and the three cities of Theveste, Sicca Veneria and Vaga. And in 448 destroyed Genseric the fortifications of the city and dismantled its castle.

=== Theodorias ===
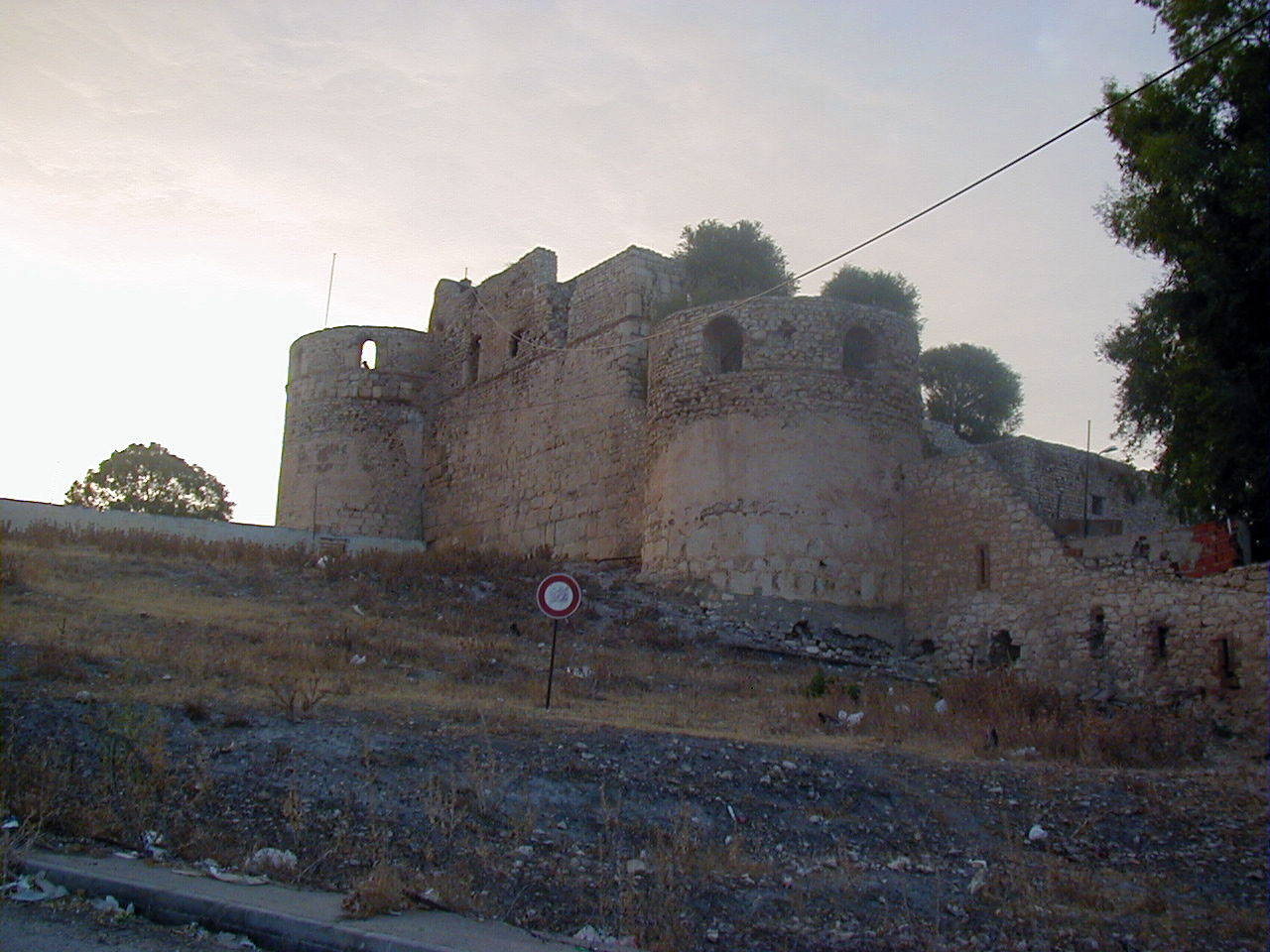
The Citadel of Vaga built by Justinian I

In 533, has the Eastern Roman Emperor Justinian I restored Africa as a Roman province and put an end to the Vandalic rule, and with that Vaga became a flourishing town again, as the emperor charged the Count Paulus to leads the works to restore the fortress of the city back. But the Emperor didn't only rebuild the castle, but he also rebuilt the entire city which was ruined by the Vandal rule, and he enlarged, embellished and repopulate the city like it was before, and to be grateful for his actions, the townspeople had renamed their city after the Empress Theodora, Theodorias.

== Diocese of Vaga ==
The city of Vaga held one of the most important dioceses of the Africa province, and gave many famous bishops, from them:

- Saint Libosus, who was a participant of the Council of Carthage (256) and died as martyr in 258,
- Bishop Crescens at that of 349;
- Ampelius and Primulus,

The ancient Christian Basilica, restored under Valentinian and Valens, is today the principal mosque of Baja.

=== Titular see of Vaga ===
The ancient bishopric passed through the Roman Empire, the arian Vandal and Orthodox Byzantine empires, only ceasing to function with the Muslim conquest of the Maghreb. The diocese was refounded in name at least in the 20th century, as a titular see of the Roman Catholic Church.

- Césaire Jean Shang, O.F.M. from 22 May 1894 to 9 September 1911 (Died)
- Daniel Cohalan from 25 May 1914 to 29 August 1916 (Appointed Bishop of Cork)
- Jean Forbes, M. Afr. from 17 November 1917 to 13 March 1926 (Died)
- Philippe Zhao Huai-yi (Tchao) from 24 June 1926 to 14 October 1927 (Died)
- Anton Theodor Fortunatus Spruit, O.F.M. from 22 December 1927 to 12 July 1943 (Died)
- Victor Alphonse Marie Sartre, S.J. from 11 March 1948 to 14 September 1955 (Appointed Archbishop of Tananarive)
- Bolesław Kominek from 1 December 1956 to 19 March 1962 (Appointed Titular Archbishop of Euchaitae)
- André Rousset from 7 February 1963 to 9 October 1966 (Appointed Bishop of Pontoise)
- Józef Gucwa from 21 December 1968 to 8 March 2004 (Died)
- André Gazaille from 11 February 2006 to 11 July 2011 (Appointed Bishop of Nicolet, Québec)
