= Tricentrus banguensis =

Scientific classification
- Kingdom: Animalia
- Phylum: Arthropoda
- Clade: Pancrustacea
- Class: Insecta
- Order: Hemiptera
- Suborder: Auchenorrhyncha
- Family: Membracidae
- Genus: Tricentrus
- Species: T. banguensis

Binomial name
- Tricentrus banguensis Funkhouser, 1914

Species of insect

Tricentrus banguensis is a species of treehoppers in the subfamily Centrotinae described by William Delbert Funkhouser in 1914. It is found in Indonesia and Malaysia.

== Etymology ==
The species name banguensis is from Banguey, now Banggi Island in Malaysia.
