= Tricentrus cinereus =

Scientific classification
- Kingdom: Animalia
- Phylum: Arthropoda
- Clade: Pancrustacea
- Class: Insecta
- Order: Hemiptera
- Suborder: Auchenorrhyncha
- Family: Membracidae
- Genus: Tricentrus
- Species: T. cinereus

Binomial name
- Tricentrus cinereus Ananthasubramanian, 1980

Species of insect

Tricentrus cinereus is a species of treehoppers in the subfamily Centrotinae described by K. S. Ananthasubramanian in 1980. It is found in India.

== Description ==
Tricentrus cinereus was originally described from two female specimens without access to a male specimen. Females are approximately 5.3 millimeters in length. Individuals of this species are generally brown in color and black on the underside of the abdomen. Their heads are approximately twice as wide as they are long and their bodies have large suprahumeral horns.
