= Tricentrus cornutus =

Scientific classification
- Kingdom: Animalia
- Phylum: Arthropoda
- Clade: Pancrustacea
- Class: Insecta
- Order: Hemiptera
- Suborder: Auchenorrhyncha
- Family: Membracidae
- Genus: Tricentrus
- Species: T. cornutus

Binomial name
- Tricentrus cornutus Ananthasubramanian, 1980

Species of insect

Tricentrus cornutus is a species of treehoppers in the subfamily Centrotinae described by K. S. Ananthasubramanian in 1980. It is found in India.

== Etymology ==
The species name cornutus comes from the Latin for "having horns".

== Description ==
Tricentrus cornutus was originally described from a single female holotype without access to a male specimen. They are about 5.8 millimeters in length with a head approximately three times as wide as it is long. Individuals of this species are rusty brown in color with a tawny brown pronotum, black humeral angles, and black-marked suprahumeral horns that project upward and outward with gently recurved tips.
