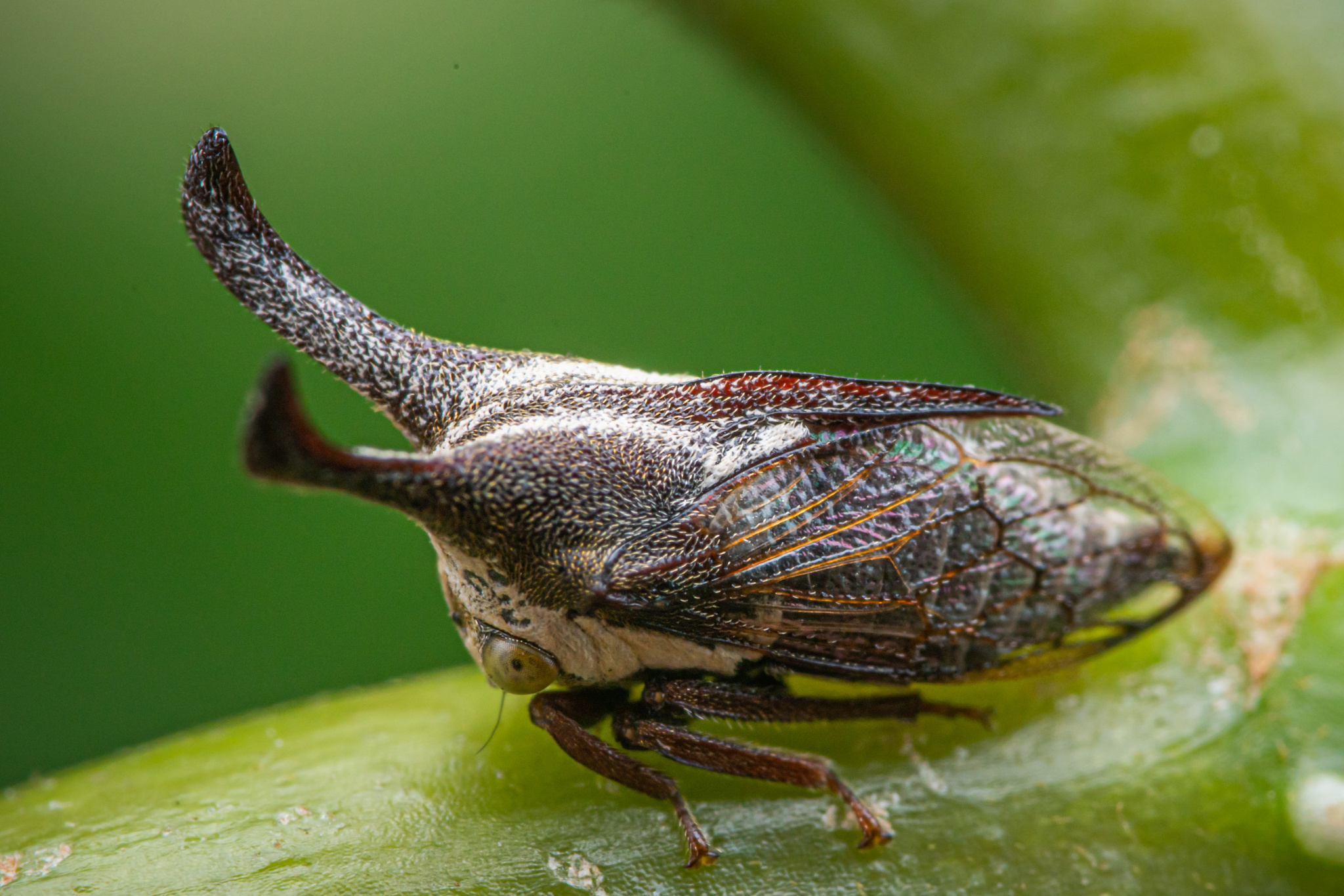

Scientific classification
- Kingdom: Animalia
- Phylum: Arthropoda
- Clade: Pancrustacea
- Class: Insecta
- Order: Hemiptera
- Suborder: Auchenorrhyncha
- Family: Membracidae
- Genus: Tricentrus
- Species: T. convergens

Binomial name
- Tricentrus convergens Walker, 1851

= Tricentrus convergens =

Species of insect

Tricentrus convergens is a species of treehoppers in the subfamily Centrotinae described by Francis Walker in 1851. It is found in the Philippines.
