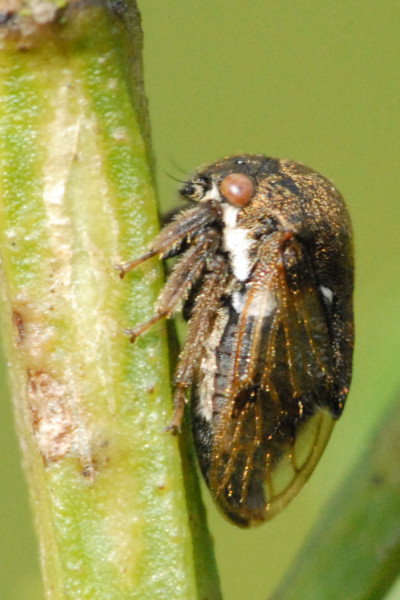

Scientific classification
- Kingdom: Animalia
- Phylum: Arthropoda
- Class: Insecta
- Order: Hemiptera
- Suborder: Auchenorrhyncha
- Family: Membracidae
- Genus: Gargara
- Species: G. genistae

Binomial name
- Gargara genistae Fabricius, 1775

Synonyms
- List: Centrotus (Gargara) genistae (Fabricius, 1775); Centrotus (Gargara) okinawanus Matsumura, 1936; Centrotus genistae (Fabricius, 1775); Centrotus genistus (Fabricius, 1775); Cicada genistae (Fabricius, 1775); Cicada infernalis Fourcroy, 1785; Cicada genistae Geoffroy, 1764; Gargara genistae (Fabricius, 1775); Gargara mongolica Dlabola, 1965; Gargara genistoe Fabricius, 1775; Membracis genistae Fabricius, 1775; Oxyrhachis genistae (Fabricius, 1775); Smilia genistae (Fabricius, 1775); Tricentrus genistae (Fabricius, 1775)

= Gargara genistae =

Species of insect

Gargara genistae is a species of treehopper in the subfamily Centrotinae.

== Description ==
Gargara genistae is dark brown in colour and reaches body lengths between 3 and 5 millimeters. The prominent and finely haired pronotum is curved upwards and extended backwards into a long, straight projection. In contrast to the similar but significantly larger Centrotus cornutus, this species does not have lateral, ear-shaped outgrowths in the head area. The forewings are brownish translucent and streaked with light brown veins.

== Distribution and habitat ==
The species is widespread in the Holarctic, with the exception of Northern Europe, in the Ethiopian and Oriental regions. The species is also occasionally found in North America, where it was apparently introduced.

The animals live predominantly in dry habitats, in sunny to semi-shady, often warm locations.

== Ecology ==
The larvae and adults feed on plant sap, which they ingest with their specially constructed, piercing-sucking mouthparts. They are oligophagous, i.e. they only feed on the plant species of one plant family. Gargara genistae exclusively suck the sugary phloem sap from the vascular tracts of shrubby Fabaceae, which they partially excrete as honeydew. These include Ononis, Genista, Colutea, Coronilla, Glycyrrhiza and Caragana.
