= Tricentrus finitimus =

Scientific classification
- Kingdom: Animalia
- Phylum: Arthropoda
- Clade: Pancrustacea
- Class: Insecta
- Order: Hemiptera
- Suborder: Auchenorrhyncha
- Family: Membracidae
- Genus: Tricentrus
- Species: T. finitimus

Binomial name
- Tricentrus finitimus Walker, 1851

Synonyms
- Centrotus finitimus Walker, 1851

Species of insect

Tricentrus finitimus is a species of treehoppers in the subfamily Centrotinae described by Francis Walker in 1851. It is found in China.

== Etymology ==
The species name finitimus comes from the Latin for "most adjoining" or "closely linked".
