= Tricentrus femoratus =

Scientific classification
- Kingdom: Animalia
- Phylum: Arthropoda
- Clade: Pancrustacea
- Class: Insecta
- Order: Hemiptera
- Suborder: Auchenorrhyncha
- Family: Membracidae
- Genus: Tricentrus
- Species: T. femoratus

Binomial name
- Tricentrus femoratus Walker, 1868

Synonyms
- Centrotus femoratus Walker, 1868

Species of insect

Tricentrus femoratus is a species of treehoppers in the subfamily Centrotinae described by Francis Walker in 1868. It is found on the island of Sulawesi in Indonesia.

== Etymology ==
The species name femoratus comes from the Latin for "having the form of a thigh".
