= Tricentrus aeneus =

Scientific classification
- Kingdom: Animalia
- Phylum: Arthropoda
- Clade: Pancrustacea
- Class: Insecta
- Order: Hemiptera
- Suborder: Auchenorrhyncha
- Family: Membracidae
- Genus: Tricentrus
- Species: T. aeneus

Binomial name
- Tricentrus aeneus Distant, 1916

Species of leafhopper

Tricentrus aeneus is a species of treehoppers in the subfamily Centrotinae described by William Lucas Distant in 1916. It is widespread throughout South and Southeast Asia.

== Etymology ==
The species name aeneus comes from the Latin for "bronze-colored".
