= Tricentrus longicornis =

Scientific classification
- Kingdom: Animalia
- Phylum: Arthropoda
- Clade: Pancrustacea
- Class: Insecta
- Order: Hemiptera
- Suborder: Auchenorrhyncha
- Family: Membracidae
- Genus: Tricentrus
- Species: T. longicornis

Binomial name
- Tricentrus longicornis Ananthasubramanian, 1980

Species of treehopper

Tricentrus longicornis is a species of treehoppers in the subfamily Centrotinae described by K. S. Ananthasubramanian in 1980. It is found in India.

== Description ==
Tricentrus longicornis was originally described from two female and one male specimens with the female selected as the holotype. Females are approximately 4 millimeters in length and males are similar in size. Individuals of both sexes are greyish brown in color with golden-yellow eyes. Their heads are approximately twice as wide as they are long and have grey suprahumeral horns with black patches.
