= Tricentrus compressus =

Scientific classification
- Kingdom: Animalia
- Phylum: Arthropoda
- Clade: Pancrustacea
- Class: Insecta
- Order: Hemiptera
- Suborder: Auchenorrhyncha
- Family: Membracidae
- Genus: Tricentrus
- Species: T. compressus

Binomial name
- Tricentrus compressus Ananthasubramanian, 1980

Species of tree hopper

Tricentrus compressus is a species of treehoppers in the subfamily Centrotinae described by K. S. Ananthasubramanian in 1980. It is found in India.

== Etymology ==
The species name compressus comes from the Latin for "compressed" or "squeezed".

== Description ==
Tricentrus compressus was described from a single female holotype. The holotype measures 6.4 millimeters in length from the frontal margin to the tips of the tegmina, with a head nearly two and three-fourths times as wide as it is long. Its general coloration is black, with a black, laterally compressed pronotum, black humeral angles, and suprahumeral horns directed obliquely upward and outward with subacute tips that incline slightly backward. The legs are light brown except for the black trochanters and femora, the abdomen is dark brown, and the ovipositor is black.
