= Tricentrus gibbosulus =

Scientific classification
- Kingdom: Animalia
- Phylum: Arthropoda
- Clade: Pancrustacea
- Class: Insecta
- Order: Hemiptera
- Suborder: Auchenorrhyncha
- Family: Membracidae
- Genus: Tricentrus
- Species: T. gibbosulus

Binomial name
- Tricentrus gibbosulus Walker, 1858

Synonyms
- Centrotus gibbosus Walker, 1858

Species of insect

Tricentrus gibbosulus is a species of treehopper in the subfamily Centrotinae described by Francis Walker in 1858. It is found in south and southeast Asia.

== Etymology ==
The species name gibbosulus comes from the Latin for "humped" or "hump-backed".
