= Tricentrus albomaculatus =

Scientific classification
- Kingdom: Animalia
- Phylum: Arthropoda
- Clade: Pancrustacea
- Class: Insecta
- Order: Hemiptera
- Suborder: Auchenorrhyncha
- Family: Membracidae
- Genus: Tricentrus
- Species: T. albomaculatus

Binomial name
- Tricentrus albomaculatus Distant, 1908

Synonyms
- Tricentrus albimaculatus Distant, 1908

Species of insect

Tricentrus albomaculatus is a species of treehoppers in the subfamily Centrotinae described by William Lucas Distant in 1908. It has a wide distribution, and is found in Asia and South America.
