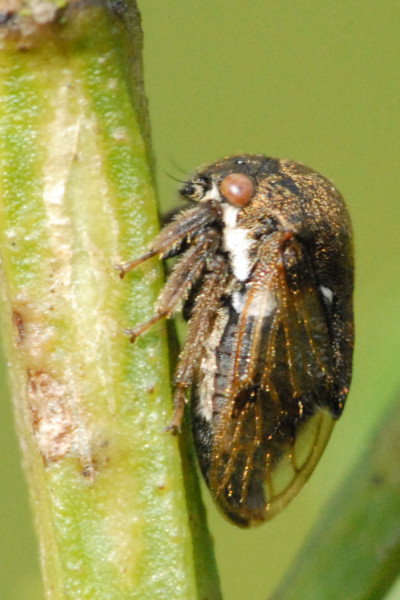
- Gargara genistae

Scientific classification
- Kingdom: Animalia
- Phylum: Arthropoda
- Clade: Pancrustacea
- Class: Insecta
- Order: Hemiptera
- Suborder: Auchenorrhyncha
- Family: Membracidae
- Subfamily: Centrotinae
- Tribe: Gargarini; Distant, 1908

Synonyms
- List: Aleptocentrini Thirumalai & Ananthasubramanian, 1985; Antialcidini Yuan & Zhang, 2002; Coccosterphini Distant, 1908; Coccosterphusaria Distant, 1908; Cococosterphini [sic] Schmidt, 1922; Gargarinae Distant, 1908; Madlini Boulard, 1995; Madlinini Boulard, 1995; Tricentrini Ahmad & Yasmeen, 1972

= Gargarini =

Tribe of insects

Gargarini is a tribe of treehoppers belonging to the subfamily Centrotinae. It was first described by William Lucas Distant in 1908.

== Genera ==
The World Auchenorrhyncha Database includes the following:

1. Aleptocentrus Thirumalai & Ananthasubramanian, 1985
2. Antialcidas Distant, 1916
3. Butragulus Anufriev & Emeljanov, 1988
4. Coccosterphus Stål, 1869
5. Cryptaspidia Stål, 1870
6. Cryptoparma Goding, 1931
7. Erecticornia Yuan & Tian, 1997
8. Eucoccosterphus Ananthasubramanian & Ghosh, 1987
9. Gargara Amyot & Audinet-Serville, 1843
10. Gargarina Ananthasubramanian, 1980
11. Kanada Distant, 1908
12. Machaerotypus Uhler, 1896
13. Madlinus Boulard, 1995
14. Maurya Distant, 1916
15. Mesocentrina Metcalf, 1952
16. Neomachaerotypus Kato, 1935
17. Nondenticentrus Yuan & Chou, 1992
18. Pantaleon Distant, 1916
19. Parayasa Distant, 1916
20. Sipylus Stål, 1866
21. Subrincator Distant, 1916
22. Thelicentrus Yuan & Cui, 1988
23. Tribulocentrus Chou & Yuan, 1982
24. Tricentroides Distant, 1916
25. Tricentrus Stål, 1866
26. Tsunozemia Kato, 1940
27. Xanthosticta Buckton, 1901
28. Yasa Distant, 1908
