= Tricentrus amurensis =

Scientific classification
- Kingdom: Animalia
- Phylum: Arthropoda
- Clade: Pancrustacea
- Class: Insecta
- Order: Hemiptera
- Suborder: Auchenorrhyncha
- Family: Membracidae
- Genus: Tricentrus
- Species: T. amurensis

Binomial name
- Tricentrus amurensis Lindberg, 1927

Species of insect

Tricentrus amurensis is a species of treehoppers in the subfamily Centrotinae described by Håkan Lindberg in 1927. It is found in China.

== Etymology ==
The species name amurensis comes from the Amur River in northeast China.
