= Pogonella =

Scientific classification
- Kingdom: Animalia
- Phylum: Arthropoda
- Clade: Pancrustacea
- Class: Insecta
- Order: Hemiptera
- Suborder: Auchenorrhyncha
- Family: Membracidae
- Subfamily: Centrotinae
- Tribe: Terentiini
- Genus: Pogonella; Evans, 1966

Genus of true bugs

Pogonella is a genus of Australian tree-hoppers in the tribe Terentiini, erected by J.W. Evans in 1966.

== Species ==
The World Auchenorrhyncha Database includes:

1. Pogonella bispinus (Stål, 1870)
2. Pogonella minuta (Goding, 1903) - type species
