= Tricentrus elegans =

Scientific classification
- Kingdom: Animalia
- Phylum: Arthropoda
- Clade: Pancrustacea
- Class: Insecta
- Order: Hemiptera
- Suborder: Auchenorrhyncha
- Family: Membracidae
- Genus: Tricentrus
- Species: T. elegans

Binomial name
- Tricentrus elegans Ananthasubramanian, 1980

Species of insect

Tricentrus elegans is a species of treehoppers in the subfamily Centrotinae described by K. S. Ananthasubramanian in 1980. It is found in India.

== Etymology ==
The species name elegans comes from the Latin for "elegant" or "handsome".

== Description ==
Tricentrus elegans was described from a single male holotype without access to a female specimen. It measures 4.9 millimeters in length from the frontal margin to the tips of the tegmina, with a head about three times as wide as it is long. Its general coloration is black, with a black pronotum and abdomen, short suprahumeral horns that are turned upward when viewed from the side and directed outward and upward when viewed from the front, and legs that are black up to the femora with greyish tibiae and tarsi.
