= Tricentrus biformis =

Scientific classification
- Kingdom: Animalia
- Phylum: Arthropoda
- Clade: Pancrustacea
- Class: Insecta
- Order: Hemiptera
- Suborder: Auchenorrhyncha
- Family: Membracidae
- Genus: Tricentrus
- Species: T. biformis

Binomial name
- Tricentrus biformis Kato, 1930

Species of insect

Tricentrus biformis is a species of treehoppers in the subfamily Centrotinae described by Masayo Kato in 1930. It is found in Taiwan.
