= Terentius =

Scientific classification
- Kingdom: Animalia
- Phylum: Arthropoda
- Class: Insecta
- Order: Hemiptera
- Suborder: Auchenorrhyncha
- Family: Membracidae
- Subfamily: Centrotinae
- Tribe: Terentiini
- Genus: Terentius; Stål, 1866

Genus of true bugs

External image
- Image at iNaturalist

Terentius is the type genus of tree-hoppers in the tribe Terentiini, erected by Carl Stål in 1866. The recorded distribution of species (probably incomplete) includes Yunnan Province, New Guinea and northern/eastern Australia.

== Species ==
The World Auchenorrhyncha Database includes:

1. Terentius albofasciarius Tian & Yuan, 1997
2. Terentius alboscutarius Tian & Yuan, 1997
3. Terentius convexus Stål, 1870 – type species
4. Terentius niger Funkhouser, 1936
5. Terentius orientalis Tian & Xu, 1997
6. Terentius retractus (Walker, 1868)
7. Terentius rolandi Distant, 1915
