= Tricentrus acutiformis =

Scientific classification
- Kingdom: Animalia
- Phylum: Arthropoda
- Clade: Pancrustacea
- Class: Insecta
- Order: Hemiptera
- Suborder: Auchenorrhyncha
- Family: Membracidae
- Genus: Tricentrus
- Species: T. acutiformis

Binomial name
- Tricentrus acutiformis Yasmeen & Ahmad, 1976

Species of treehopper

Tricentrus acutiformis is a species of treehoppers in the subfamily Centrotinae described by Nighat Yasmeen & Imtiaz Ahmad in 1976. It is found in Pakistan.

== Etymology ==
The species name acutiformis comes from the Latin for "pointed" or "needle-shaped".
