= Tricentrus acuticornis =

Scientific classification
- Kingdom: Animalia
- Phylum: Arthropoda
- Clade: Pancrustacea
- Class: Insecta
- Order: Hemiptera
- Suborder: Auchenorrhyncha
- Family: Membracidae
- Genus: Tricentrus
- Species: T. acuticornis

Binomial name
- Tricentrus acuticornis Funkhouser, 1919

Species of insect

Tricentrus acuticornis is a species of treehoppers in the subfamily Centrotinae described by William Delbert Funkhouser in 1919. It is found in Southeast Asia.

== Etymology ==
The species name acuticornis comes from the Latin for "having sharp horns".
