= Tricentrus acer =

Scientific classification
- Kingdom: Animalia
- Phylum: Arthropoda
- Clade: Pancrustacea
- Class: Insecta
- Order: Hemiptera
- Suborder: Auchenorrhyncha
- Family: Membracidae
- Genus: Tricentrus
- Species: T. acer

Binomial name
- Tricentrus acer Walker, 1858

Species of treehopper

Tricentrus acer is a species of treehoppers in the subfamily Centrotinae described by Francis Walker in 1858. It is found in Indonesia, Malaysia, and Papua New Guinea.

== Etymology ==
The species name acer comes from the Latin for "sharp".
