= Tricentrus minutus =

Scientific classification
- Kingdom: Animalia
- Phylum: Arthropoda
- Clade: Pancrustacea
- Class: Insecta
- Order: Hemiptera
- Suborder: Auchenorrhyncha
- Family: Membracidae
- Genus: Tricentrus
- Species: T. minutus

Binomial name
- Tricentrus minutus Funkhouser, 1936

Species of insect

Tricentrus minutus is a species of treehoppers in the subfamily Centrotinae described by William Delbert Funkhouser in 1936. It is found in Indonesia and East Timor.
