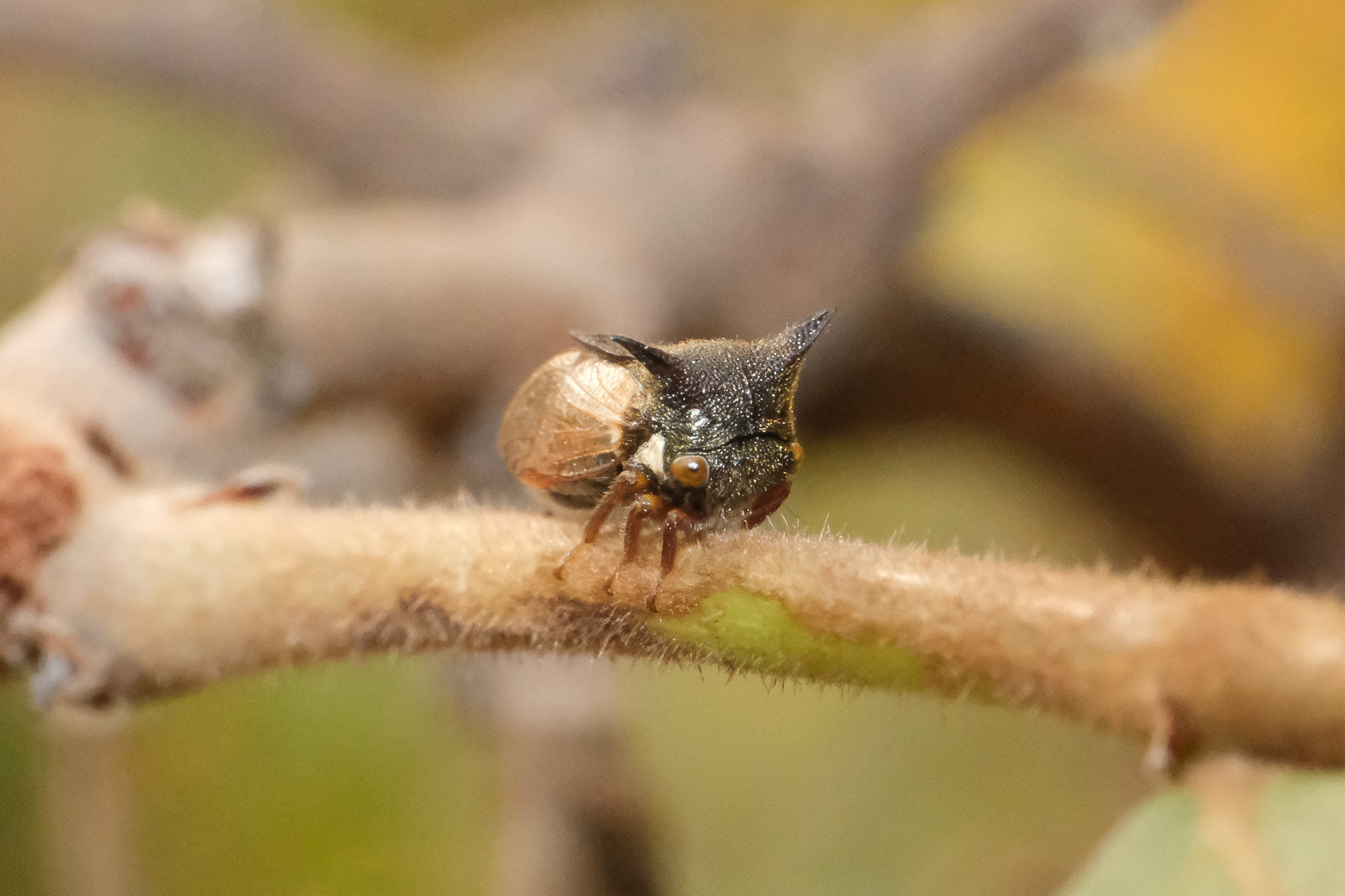

Scientific classification
- Kingdom: Animalia
- Phylum: Arthropoda
- Clade: Pancrustacea
- Class: Insecta
- Order: Hemiptera
- Suborder: Auchenorrhyncha
- Family: Membracidae
- Genus: Tricentrus
- Species: T. pieli

Binomial name
- Tricentrus pieli Funkhouser, 1934

= Tricentrus pieli =

Species of insect

Tricentrus pieli is a species of treehoppers in the subfamily Centrotinae described by William Delbert Funkhouser in 1934. It is found in East and Southeast Asia.
