= Tricentrus longiceps =

Scientific classification
- Kingdom: Animalia
- Phylum: Arthropoda
- Clade: Pancrustacea
- Class: Insecta
- Order: Hemiptera
- Suborder: Auchenorrhyncha
- Family: Membracidae
- Genus: Tricentrus
- Species: T. longiceps

Binomial name
- Tricentrus longiceps Ananthasubramanian, 1980

Species of tree hopper

Tricentrus longiceps is a species of treehoppers in the subfamily Centrotinae described by K. S. Ananthasubramanian in 1980. It is found in India.

== Etymology ==
The species name longiceps comes from the Latin for "long head".

== Description ==
Tricentrus longiceps was described from a single female holotype without access to a male specimen. It measures 5.7 millimeters in length from the frontal margin to the tips of the tegmina, with a head about two and three-fourths times as wide as it is long. Its general coloration is rusty brown, with a rusty brown pronotum, tawny brown suprahumeral horns shaded with black at the apical third, and tegmina bearing a pale white rounded fascia on the basal sixth. The abdomen is dark reddish brown, and the legs are entirely tawny brown.
