= Tricentrus ferrugineus =

Scientific classification
- Kingdom: Animalia
- Phylum: Arthropoda
- Clade: Pancrustacea
- Class: Insecta
- Order: Hemiptera
- Suborder: Auchenorrhyncha
- Family: Membracidae
- Genus: Tricentrus
- Species: T. ferrugineus

Binomial name
- Tricentrus ferrugineus Walker, 1868

Synonyms
- Centrotus ferrugineus Pogon ferrugineum

Species of insect

Tricentrus ferrugineus is a species of treehoppers in the subfamily Centrotinae described by Francis Walker in 1868. It is found on the island of Papua.

== Etymology ==
The species name ferrugineus comes from the Latin for "rust-colored".
