= Tricentrus aequicornis =

Scientific classification
- Kingdom: Animalia
- Phylum: Arthropoda
- Clade: Pancrustacea
- Class: Insecta
- Order: Hemiptera
- Suborder: Auchenorrhyncha
- Family: Membracidae
- Genus: Tricentrus
- Species: T. aequicornis

Binomial name
- Tricentrus aequicornis Funkhouser, 1927

Species of insect

Tricentrus aequicornis is a species of treehoppers in the subfamily Centrotinae described by William Delbert Funkhouser in 1927. It is found in The Philippines.
