= Tricentrus albipennis =

Scientific classification
- Kingdom: Animalia
- Phylum: Arthropoda
- Clade: Pancrustacea
- Class: Insecta
- Order: Hemiptera
- Suborder: Auchenorrhyncha
- Family: Membracidae
- Genus: Tricentrus
- Species: T. albipennis

Binomial name
- Tricentrus albipennis Kato, 1930

Species of insect

Tricentrus albipennis is a species of treehoppers in the subfamily Centrotinae described by Masayo Kato in 1930. It is found in Taiwan and has an asserted distribution that extends to mainland China and Central Asia.
