= Tricentrus spinis =

Scientific classification
- Kingdom: Animalia
- Phylum: Arthropoda
- Clade: Pancrustacea
- Class: Insecta
- Order: Hemiptera
- Suborder: Auchenorrhyncha
- Family: Membracidae
- Genus: Tricentrus
- Species: T. spinis

Binomial name
- Tricentrus spinis Funkhouser, 1935

Species of insect

Tricentrus spinis is a species of treehoppers in the subfamily Centrotinae described by William Delbert Funkhouser in 1935. It is found in Malaysia.
