= Sextius =

Scientific classification
- Kingdom: Animalia
- Phylum: Arthropoda
- Clade: Pancrustacea
- Class: Insecta
- Order: Hemiptera
- Suborder: Auchenorrhyncha
- Family: Membracidae
- Subfamily: Centrotinae
- Tribe: Terentiini
- Genus: Sextius; Stål, 1866

Synonyms
- Pterosticta Buckton, 1903

Genus of true bugs

Sextius is a genus of Australian tree-hoppers in the tribe Terentiini, erected by Carl Stål in 1866.

== Species ==
The World Auchenorrhyncha Database includes:

1. Sextius assimilis Kirkaldy, 1906
2. Sextius atromaculatus Distant, 1916
3. Sextius bucephalus Distant, 1916
4. Sextius depressus Goding, 1903
5. Sextius interpositus (Buckton, 1903)
6. Sextius kurandae Kirkaldy, 1906
7. Sextius major Distant, 1916
8. Sextius occidentalis Jacobi, 1909
9. Sextius reticulatus Distant, 1916
10. Sextius rubrilinea (Buckton, 1903)
11. Sextius spretus (Buckton, 1903)
12. Sextius virescens (Fairmaire, 1847) - type species
