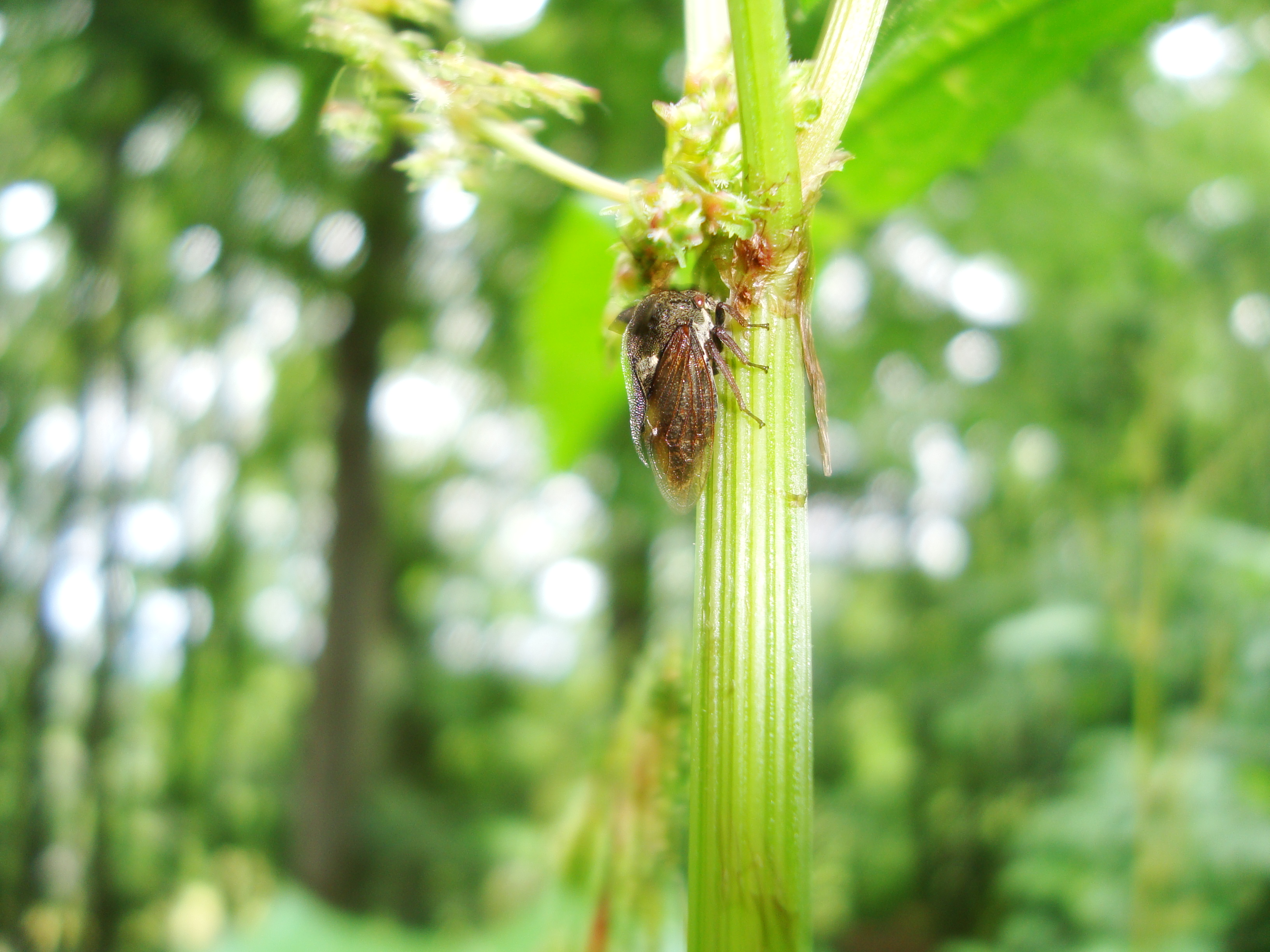
- Gargara genistae

Scientific classification
- Kingdom: Animalia
- Phylum: Arthropoda
- Clade: Pancrustacea
- Class: Insecta
- Order: Hemiptera
- Suborder: Auchenorrhyncha
- Family: Membracidae
- Subfamily: Centrotinae
- Tribe: Gargarini
- Genus: Gargara; Amyot & Audinet-Serville, 1843

Synonyms
- Gorgora [sic] Amyot & Audinet-Serville, 1843; Macrops [sic] Buckton, 1903; Maerops Buckton, 1903; Moerops [sic] Buckton, 1903; Kotogargara Matsumura, 1938

= Gargara (treehopper) =

Genus of true bugs

External image
- Images at iNaturalist

Gargara is a large genus of tree-hoppers, typical of the tribe Gargarini, erected by Charles Jean-Baptiste Amyot and Jean Guillaume Audinet-Serville in 1843. There are widespread records of occurrence from Africa, Europe, Asia and Australia; the type species G. genistae can be found in southern Britain.

== Species ==
The World Auchenorrhyncha Database includes:

Subgenus Gargara (Gargara) Amyot & Audinet-Serville, 1843

1. Gargara aceripennis Jacobi, 1941
2. Gargara addahensis Distant, 1915
3. Gargara aenea Distant, 1915
4. Gargara affinis Distant, 1908
5. Gargara albitarsis Ananthasubramanian & Ananthakrishnan, 1975
6. Gargara alboapicata Distant, 1908
7. Gargara albolinea Funkhouser, 1927
8. Gargara albopleura Funkhouser, 1940
9. Gargara aliquantula Liang & McKamey, 1996
10. Gargara anomala Kato, 1940
11. Gargara apicata Melichar, 1903
12. Gargara asperula (Walker, 1858)
13. Gargara aterrima Distant, 1915
14. Gargara attenuata Funkhouser, 1914
15. Gargara aurea Funkhouser, 1933
16. Gargara australiensis Funkhouser, 1936
17. Gargara barkamensis Chou & Yuan, 1992
18. Gargara basiplagiata Jacobi, 1944
19. Gargara bicolor Funkhouser, 1927
20. Gargara botanshana Kato, 1928
21. Gargara brevis Ananthasubramanian, 1980
22. Gargara brunnea Funkhouser, 1914
23. Gargara brunneidorsata Funkhouser, 1929
24. Gargara brunneosula Jacobi, 1944
25. Gargara buruensis Schmidt, 1926
26. Gargara caelata Distant, 1916
27. Gargara carinata Funkhouser, 1935
28. Gargara castanea Kato, 1928
29. Gargara chichonettae Boulard, 1968
30. Gargara citrea Distant, 1908
31. Gargara confusa Distant, 1916
32. Gargara consocia (Walker, 1857)
33. Gargara contraria Distant, 1916
34. Gargara davidi Fallou, 1890
35. Gargara delimitata Distant, 1908
36. Gargara desmodiuma Kato, 1937
37. Gargara discoidea Dmitriev & Deitz, 2017
38. Gargara discrepans Goding, 1930
39. Gargara doenitzae (Matsumura, 1912)
40. Gargara dorsata Funkhouser, 1935
41. Gargara elegans Kato, 1928
42. Gargara elongata Kato, 1928
43. Gargara escalerai Peláez, 1935
44. Gargara extrema Distant, 1916
45. Gargara fasceifrontis Funkhouser, 1927
46. Gargara flavocarinata Funkhouser, 1927
47. Gargara flavolineata Distant, 1908
48. Gargara floresiana Jacobi, 1941
49. Gargara fragila Funkhouser, 1927
50. Gargara fraterna Distant, 1915
51. Gargara fumipennis Kato, 1930
52. Gargara genistae (Fabricius, 1775)
53. Gargara gibbosa Mohammad & Ahmad, 1994
54. Gargara gracila Funkhouser, 1927
55. Gargara granulata Funkhouser, 1927
56. Gargara gressitti Funkhouser, 1942
57. Gargara grisea Funkhouser, 1919
58. Gargara hachijoinsulana Kato, 1940
59. Gargara hoffmanni Funkhouser, 1937
60. Gargara horishana (Matsumura, 1912)
61. Gargara hyalifascia Funkhouser, 1927
62. Gargara hyalina Kato, 1930
63. Gargara inconspicua Haglund, 1899
64. Gargara indica Bierman, 1910
65. Gargara iranica Dlabola, 1979
66. Gargara irrorata Funkhouser, 1918
67. Gargara kandala Ananthasubramanian, 1996
68. Gargara katoi Metcalf & Wade, 1965
69. Gargara kawakamii (Matsumura, 1912)
70. Gargara lata Funkhouser, 1921
71. Gargara laticapitata Kato, 1928
72. Gargara ligustri (Matsumura, 1912)
73. Gargara lodhranensis Mohammad & Ahmad, 1993
74. Gargara longispina Mohammad & Ahmad, 1994
75. Gargara luconica (Fairmaire, 1846)
76. Gargara lullae Boulard, 1968
77. Gargara luteinervis Funkhouser, 1936
78. Gargara luteipennis Funkhouser, 1914
79. Gargara maculata Funkhouser, 1936
80. Gargara maculipennis Funkhouser, 1918
81. Gargara madrasensis Ananthasubramanian & Ananthakrishnan, 1975
82. Gargara majuscula Distant, 1908
83. Gargara makalakae Distant, 1908
84. Gargara malabarica Ananthasubramanian & Ananthakrishnan, 1975
85. Gargara malaya (Stål, 1859)
86. Gargara marginata Kato, 1929
87. Gargara minor Funkhouser, 1934
88. Gargara minuscula (Walker, 1868)
89. Gargara minuta Funkhouser, 1914
90. Gargara myittae Distant, 1908
91. Gargara naranensis Mohammad & Ahmad, 1994
92. Gargara neonigroapica Mohammad & Ahmad, 1993
93. Gargara neonigrocarinata Mohammad & Ahmad, 1994
94. Gargara nervosa Funkhouser, 1918
95. Gargara nigriceps Bierman, 1910
96. Gargara nigricornis Ahmad & Yasmeen, 1973
97. Gargara nigroapica Funkhouser, 1927
98. Gargara nigrocarinata Funkhouser, 1914
99. Gargara nigrolimbata Ananthasubramanian, 1980
100. Gargara nigromaculata Funkhouser, 1927
101. Gargara nigronervosa Kato, 1928
102. Gargara nigrostigmata Anufriev, 1988
103. Gargara nitidipennis Funkhouser, 1914
104. Gargara nodinervis Funkhouser, 1927
105. Gargara nodulata Funkhouser, 1942
106. Gargara nokozana Kato, 1928
107. Gargara nyanzai Funkhouser, 1927
108. Gargara opaca Funkhouser, 1938
109. Gargara orientalis Funkhouser, 1927
110. Gargara ornata Funkhouser, 1929
111. Gargara pakistanica Dlabola, 1979
112. Gargara pallida Kato, 1928
113. Gargara patruelis (Stål, 1859)
114. Gargara pellucida Ananthasubramanian, 1980
115. Gargara penangi Funkhouser, 1918
116. Gargara perpolita Distant, 1915
117. Gargara picea Kato, 1928
118. Gargara pilinervosa Funkhouser, 1920
119. Gargara pilosa Funkhouser, 1927
120. Gargara pinguis Funkhouser, 1918
121. Gargara projecta Funkhouser, 1918
122. Gargara projectiformis Mohammad & Ahmad, 1994
123. Gargara proxima Peláez, 1935
124. Gargara pseudocontraria Ahmad & Yasmeen, 1973
125. Gargara pulchella Funkhouser, 1935
126. Gargara pulchripennis Stål, 1870
127. Gargara pulniensis Ananthasubramanian, 1980
128. Gargara rhodendrona Kato, 1937
129. Gargara rivulata Distant, 1908
130. Gargara robusta Distant, 1908
131. Gargara rubens Peláez, 1935
132. Gargara rubrogranulata Bierman, 1910
133. Gargara rufula Funkhouser, 1935
134. Gargara rugonervosa Funkhouser, 1918
135. Gargara rustica Ananthasubramanian & Ananthakrishnan, 1975
136. Gargara selangori Funkhouser, 1935
137. Gargara semibrunnea Funkhouser, 1929
138. Gargara semifascia (Walker, 1857)
139. Gargara semivitrea (Walker, 1857)
140. Gargara sericea Distant, 1908
141. Gargara setosa Funkhouser, 1935
142. Gargara sikhimensis Distant, 1908
143. Gargara sindellus Mohammad & Ahmad, 1993
144. Gargara sinuata Funkhouser, 1914
145. Gargara soeroelangoena Bierman, 1910
146. Gargara sordida Funkhouser, 1918
147. Gargara splendidula Distant, 1916
148. Gargara stepposa Tishechkin, 2005
149. Gargara substraighta Mohammad & Ahmad, 1994
150. Gargara suigensis Kato, 1930
151. Gargara sumbawae Funkhouser, 1914
152. Gargara taihokunis Kato, 1928
153. Gargara taikomontana Kato, 1928
154. Gargara taitoensis Kato, 1928
155. Gargara takahashii Kato, 1940
156. Gargara tappana (Matsumura, 1912)
157. Gargara tectiforma Funkhouser, 1938
158. Gargara tigris Funkhouser, 1935
159. Gargara tonkini Funkhouser, 1942
160. Gargara triangulata Funkhouser, 1918
161. Gargara trinotata Distant, 1908
162. Gargara trivialis (Buckton, 1901)
163. Gargara tuberculata Funkhouser, 1914
164. Gargara tumida Melichar, 1903
165. Gargara varicolor Stål, 1870
166. Gargara variegata (Signoret, 1858)
167. Gargara venosa (Walker, 1868)
168. Gargara virescens Funkhouser, 1927
169. Gargara zonata (Matsumura, 1912)

Subgenus Gargara (Kotogargara) Matsumura, 1938 – Indomalayan region

1. Gargara botelensis (Matsumura, 1938)
2. Gargara guttulinervis (Matsumura, 1912)
3. Gargara nigrofasciata Stål, 1870
4. Gargara nodipennis Funkhouser, 1927
5. Gargara parvula Lindberg, 1927

Subgenus not determined

1. Gargara conspicuua Mohammad & Ahmad, 1996
2. Gargara inconspicuua Mohammad & Ahmad, 1996
