= Funkhouserella =

Scientific classification
- Kingdom: Animalia
- Phylum: Arthropoda
- Clade: Pancrustacea
- Class: Insecta
- Order: Hemiptera
- Suborder: Auchenorrhyncha
- Superfamily: Membracoidea
- Family: Membracidae
- Genus: Funkhouserella; Schmidt, 1926

Genus of insects

Funkhouserella is a genus of insects belonging to the family Membracidae.

The genus contains the following species:

- Funkhouserella arborea
- Funkhouserella binodis
- Funkhouserella brevifurca
- Funkhouserella bulbiturris
- Funkhouserella pinguiturris
- Funkhouserella sinuata
