= William Delbert Funkhouser =

American Entomologist

- Born: 13 March 1881; Rockport, Indiana
- Died: 9 June 1948 (aged 67); Lexington, Kentucky
- Education: Wabash College (BA); Cornell University (MA) (PhD)
- Occupations: Entomologist; Anthropologist; Zoologist

William Delbert Funkhouser was an American zoologist, entomologist, and anthropologist who was best known for his contribution to the study of Treehoppers and of Native American Mounds in the state of Kentucky.

== Early life ==
William Delbert Funkhouser was born on June 9, 1881, in Rockport, Indiana. As a child, he attended public school in Indianapolis and went on to study at Wabash College where he was reportedly a successful student athlete and Yell Leader. He graduated with honors in 1905 with a Bachelor of Arts.

After graduation, Funkhouser spent several years as a high school teacher, first in Indiana and Brazil, and later in Ithica, New York. While living in Ithica, he enrolled in Cornell University where he completed his Master of Arts in 1912 and published his masters thesis Homologies of the Wing-Veins of the Membracidae. Four years later, he completed his Ph.D. at Cornell as well and published his dissertation Biology of the Membracidae of the Cayuga Lake Basin in 1916.

== Career ==
Tricentrus spinis described by Funkhouser in 1935

Following the completion of his Ph.D. at Cornell, Funkhouser was appointed Professor of Zoology and department head at the University of Kentucky. He was reportedly an entertaining lecturer, with one student later recalling an instance where Funkhouser would give a lecture "explaining the characteristics of a particularly nasty snake" only to then pull the snake out of his shirt where he had been concealing it since the start of class. He published papers at a cadence of 15-20 per year for a total of over 300 publications by the time of his death. In 1925 he became dean of the University of Kentucky's graduate school and in 1927 he wrote arguably his most famous single work Catalog of the Membracidae. In 1932, he embarked on a year-long trip around the world where he met in person with contemporaries and went on expeditions into the jungles of Africa and modern-day Malaysia and Indonesia. He would go on to publish numerous articles on the Membracidae of these regions.

=== Archaeology and anthropology ===
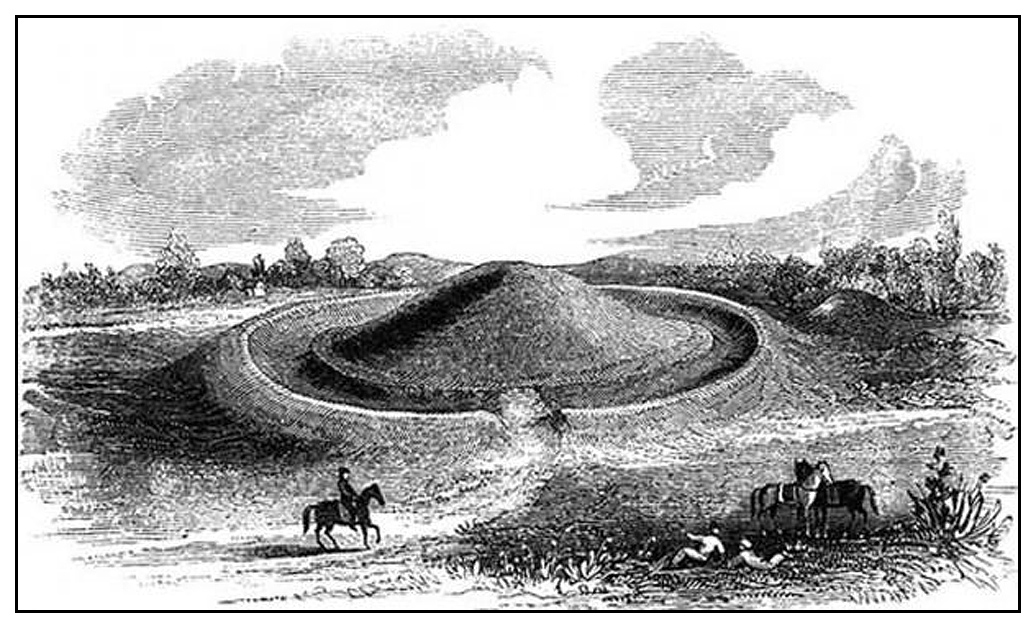
Biggs Mound, an Indian Mound in northeast Kentucky

In addition to his primary career as a zoologist and entomologist, Funkhouser took a serious interest in studying Kentucky's Native American mounds and archeological sites. In cooperation with his colleague W. S. Webb, the pair spent their free time systematically excavating and cataloguing the nearby mounds leading to the publication of numerous archeological papers and collection of thousands of artifacts. In 1927, the pair published Ancient Life in Kentucky as documentation of their work. In refence to his work in this domain, when Funkhouser published his autobiography in 1941, he titled it Autobiography of an old man: a study in anthropology.

== Death and legacy ==
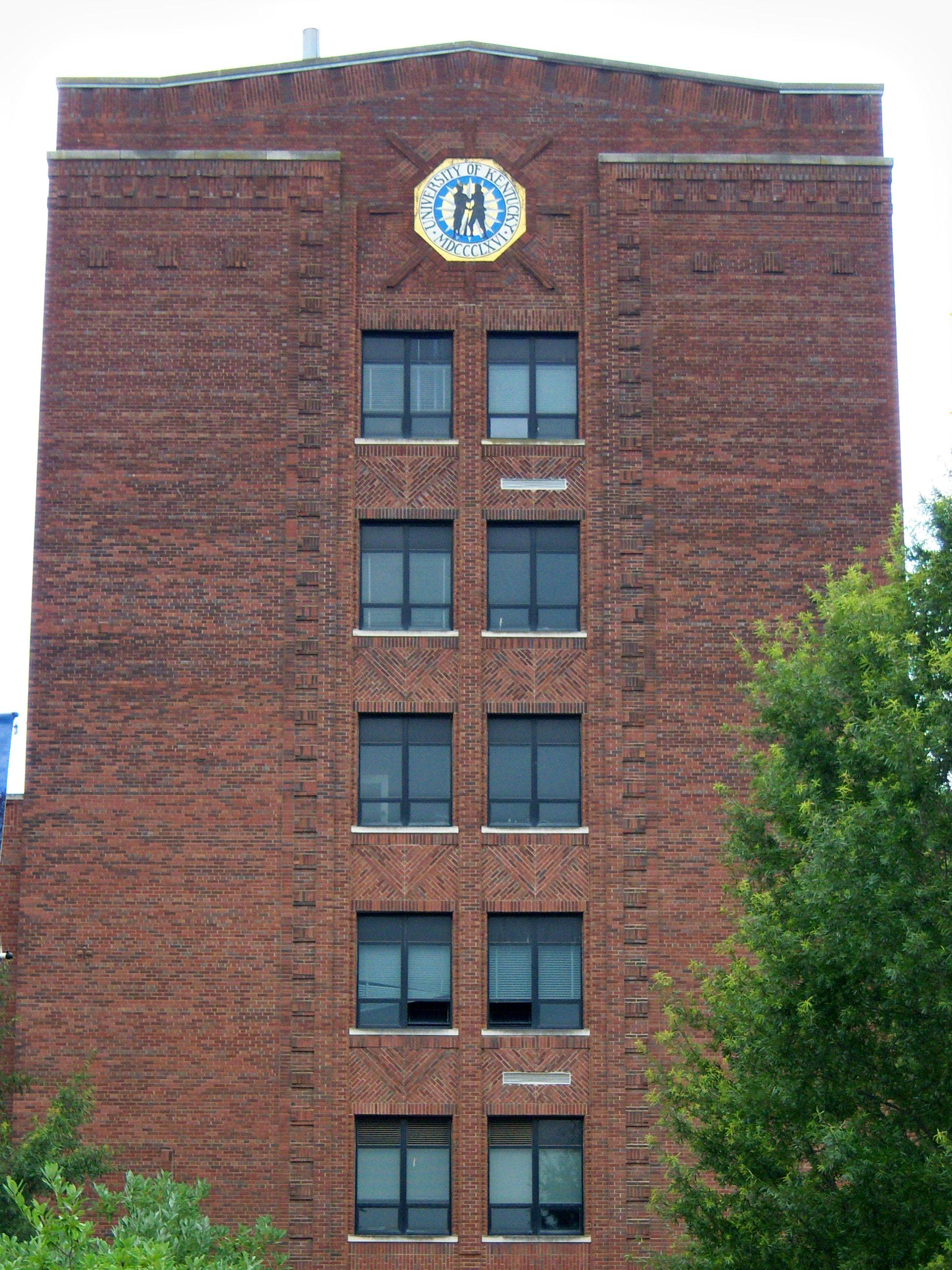
The Funkhouser Building at the University of Kentucky

William Funkhouser died on June 9, 1948, in Lexington Kentucky of Lung cancer. He is remembered as one of the most prolific figures in the history of American entomology, publishing over 300 papers and several full-length books over the course of his career. He described hundreds of new species of treehoppers, including over 70 species in the genus Tricentus and all six species in the genus Funkhouserella, which was named later in his honor. Numerous other taxa have been named in his honor, including the genus Funkhouseriana and the species Tricentrus funkhouseri. The Funkhouser Building at the University of Kentucky and nearby Funkhouser Drive are likewise named in his honor.

The University of Kentucky credits Funkhouser's archeological and anthropological work as a major contributor to the university being one of the first in the United States to have an independent anthropology department. At the time of his death, much of what was known about Kentucky's prehistory could be attributed to Funkhouser and Webb's efforts in this domain.

== Selected works ==
Some selected works authored or coauthored by William Delbert Funkhouser:

- Homologies of the Wing-Veins of the Membracidae (1913)
- Wild Life in Kentucky (1924)
- Ancient Life in Kentucky (1926) with W.S. Webb
- Catalog of the Membracidae (1927)
- Autobiography of an old man: a study in anthropology (1941)
