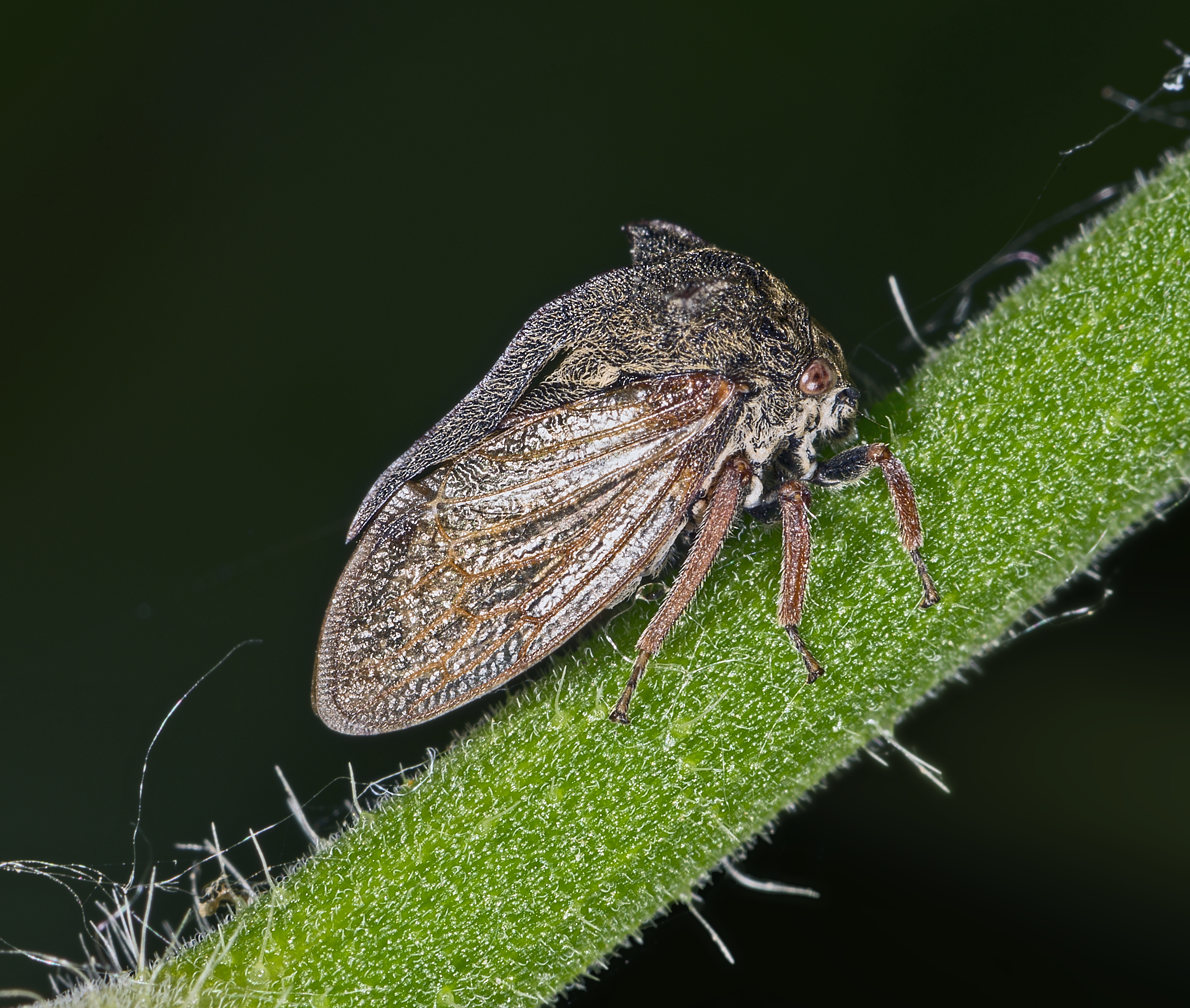
- Centrotus cornutus

Scientific classification
- Kingdom: Animalia
- Phylum: Arthropoda
- Clade: Pancrustacea
- Class: Insecta
- Order: Hemiptera
- Suborder: Auchenorrhyncha
- Family: Membracidae
- Subfamily: Centrotinae
- Tribe: Centrotini; Amyot & Serville, 1843

Synonyms
- List: Acanthophyesini Distant, 1908; Acanthophyesaria Distant, 1908; Centrodinae [sic] Amyot & Audinet-Serville, 1843; Centrodita [sic] Amyot & Audinet-Serville, 1843; Centroninae [sic] Amyot & Audinet-Serville, 1843; Centrotida Amyot & Audinet-Serville, 1843; Centrotidae Amyot & Audinet-Serville, 1843; Centrotina Amyot & Audinet-Serville, 1843; Centrotinae Amyot & Audinet-Serville, 1843; Centroti [sic] Amyot & Audinet-Serville, 1843; Centrotoideae Amyot & Audinet-Serville, 1843; Centrotusaria Amyot & Audinet-Serville, 1843; Cruciatae Beckmann, 1772; Nudiscuti Amyot & Audinet-Serville, 1843; Platybelini Capener, 1952; Platybelinae Capener, 1952

= Centrotini =

Tribe of true bugs

Centrotini is a tribe of treehopper genera in the subfamily Centrotinae. It was first described by Charles Jean-Baptiste Amyot and Jean Guillaume Audinet-Serville in 1843. Species in this tribe are mostly recorded from Africa, Europe and throughout Asia to New Guinea.

== Genera ==
The following genera are recognised:

1. Acanthophyes Stål, 1866
2. Afraceronotus Boulard, 1976
3. Anchon Buckton, 1903
4. Anchonastes Capener, 1972
5. Anchonobelus Capener, 1954
6. Anchonomonoides McKamey, 1994
7. Aurinotus Capener, 1968
8. Barsumas Distant, 1916
9. Barsumoides Boulard, 1976
10. Bleccia Capener, 1968
11. Capeneralus Deitz, 1983
12. Capeneriana Boulard, 1976
13. Centrotus Fabricius, 1803
14. Cornutobelus Capener, 1954
15. Daconotus Capener, 1968
16. Dagonotus Capener, 1972
17. Distantobelus Capener, 1954
18. Euceropsila Boulard, 1979
19. Eumocentrulus Boulard, 1977
20. Eumonocentrus Schmidt, 1911
21. Farcicaudia Capener, 1968
22. Flatyperphyma Boulard, 1976
23. Flexanotus Capener, 1968
24. Foliatrotus Capener, 1953
25. Hamma Buckton, 1905
26. Kallicrates Capener, 1968
27. Leprechaunus Capener, 1950
28. Matonotus Capener, 1954
29. Menthogonus Capener, 1968
30. Mitranotus Boulard, 1983
31. Monanchon Boulard, 1977
32. Monocentrus Melichar, 1905
33. Paraxiphopoeus Goding, 1930
34. Platybelus Stål, 1866
35. Promitor Distant, 1915
36. Rachinotus Capener, 1968
37. Rexicornia Capener, 1968
38. Saudaraba Dlabola, 1979
39. Spalirises Distant, 1916
40. Stalobelus Capener, 1954
41. Streonus Capener, 1968
42. Takliwa Funkhouser, 1935
43. Tiberianus Distant, 1915
44. Tricoceps Buckton, 1903
45. Vecranotus Capener, 1968
46. Zanzia Capener, 1968
