= Leprechaunus cristatus =

Scientific classification
- Kingdom: Animalia
- Phylum: Arthropoda
- Clade: Pancrustacea
- Class: Insecta
- Order: Hemiptera
- Suborder: Auchenorrhyncha
- Family: Membracidae
- Genus: Leprechaunus
- Species: L. cristatus

Binomial name
- Leprechaunus cristatus Capener, 1950

Species of insect

Leprechaunus cristatus is a species of treehoppers in the subfamily Centrotinae. It was first described by Alfred Lawrence Capener in 1950 and is the type species for the genus Leprechaunus. It is found in South Africa.

== Ecology ==
Individuals of this species have been found on the host plants Brachylaena discolor and Grewia occidentalis, and on a single occasion, individuals were collected from host plant Trema guineensis. The species engage in myrmecophily with the ant species Crematogaster castanea.
