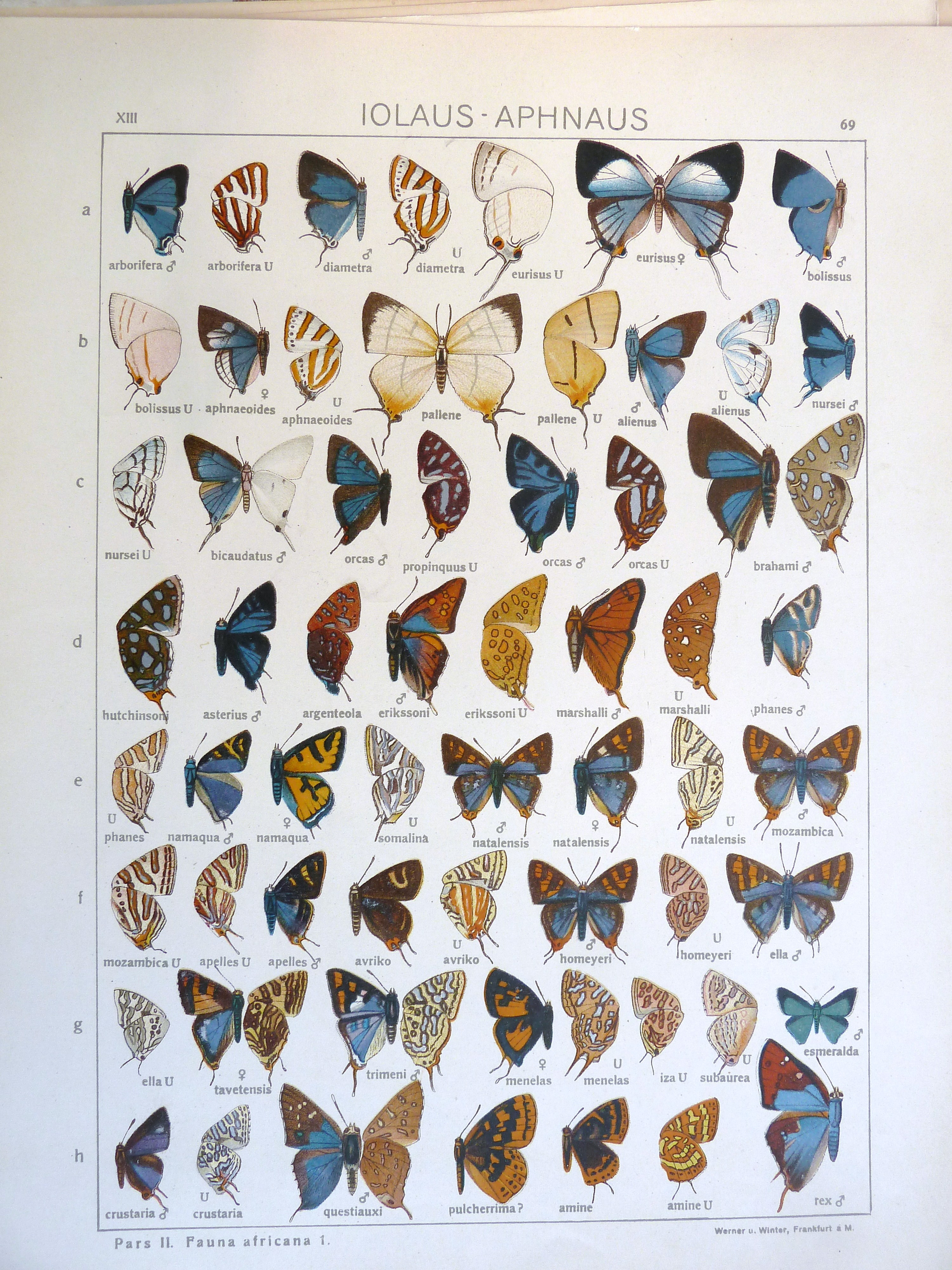
- Seitz Fauna AfricanaTaf 69 (line d, e)

Scientific classification
- Kingdom: Animalia
- Phylum: Arthropoda
- Clade: Pancrustacea
- Class: Insecta
- Order: Lepidoptera
- Family: Lycaenidae
- Genus: Cigaritis
- Species: C. phanes

Binomial name
- Cigaritis phanes (Trimen, 1873)

Synonyms
- Aphnaeus phanes Trimen, 1873; Spindasis phanes; Aphnaeus erna Staudinger, 1888

= Cigaritis phanes =

Silvery bar

Species of butterfly

Cigaritis phanes, the silvery bar, is a butterfly of the family Lycaenidae. It is found in south-west Africa, including Botswana, Zimbabwe and South Africa. In South Africa it is found from north-western KwaZulu-Natal to the northern part of the Free State, Gauteng, Mpumalanga, Limpopo, North West and Northern Cape.

== Description ==
The wingspan is 24–27 mm for males and 26–30 mm for females. Adults are on wing year-round with peaks from September to November and from March to June.

C. phanes species exhibit notable variations in coloration, compared to specimens from other regions in South Africa.

== Habitat and behavior ==
The larvae feed on Acacia mellifera and Ximenia afra. They are associated with the ant species Crematogaster castanea.
