= Leprechaunus longicornis =

Scientific classification
- Kingdom: Animalia
- Phylum: Arthropoda
- Clade: Pancrustacea
- Class: Insecta
- Order: Hemiptera
- Suborder: Auchenorrhyncha
- Family: Membracidae
- Genus: Leprechaunus
- Species: L. longicornis

Binomial name
- Leprechaunus longicornis Capener, 1972

Species of insect

Leprechaunus longicornis is a species of treehopper in the subfamily Centrotinae first described by Alfred Lawrence Capener in 1972. It is found in Zimbabwe.
