= Dagonotus =

Scientific classification
- Kingdom: Animalia
- Phylum: Arthropoda
- Clade: Pancrustacea
- Class: Insecta
- Order: Hemiptera
- Suborder: Auchenorrhyncha
- Family: Membracidae
- Subfamily: Centrotinae
- Tribe: Centrotini
- Genus: Dagonotus; Capener, 1972

Type species
- Dagonotus lectus Capener, 1972

Genus of insects

Dagonotus is a genus of treehoppers in the subfamily Centrotinae. It was first described by Alfred Lawrence Capener in 1972. Species within this genus are found in Sub-Saharan Africa, including Democratic Republic of the Congo, Tanzania, and Mozambique.

== Species ==
The following species are recognized:

- Dagonotus discolor Capener, 1972
- Dagonotus lectus Capener, 1972
