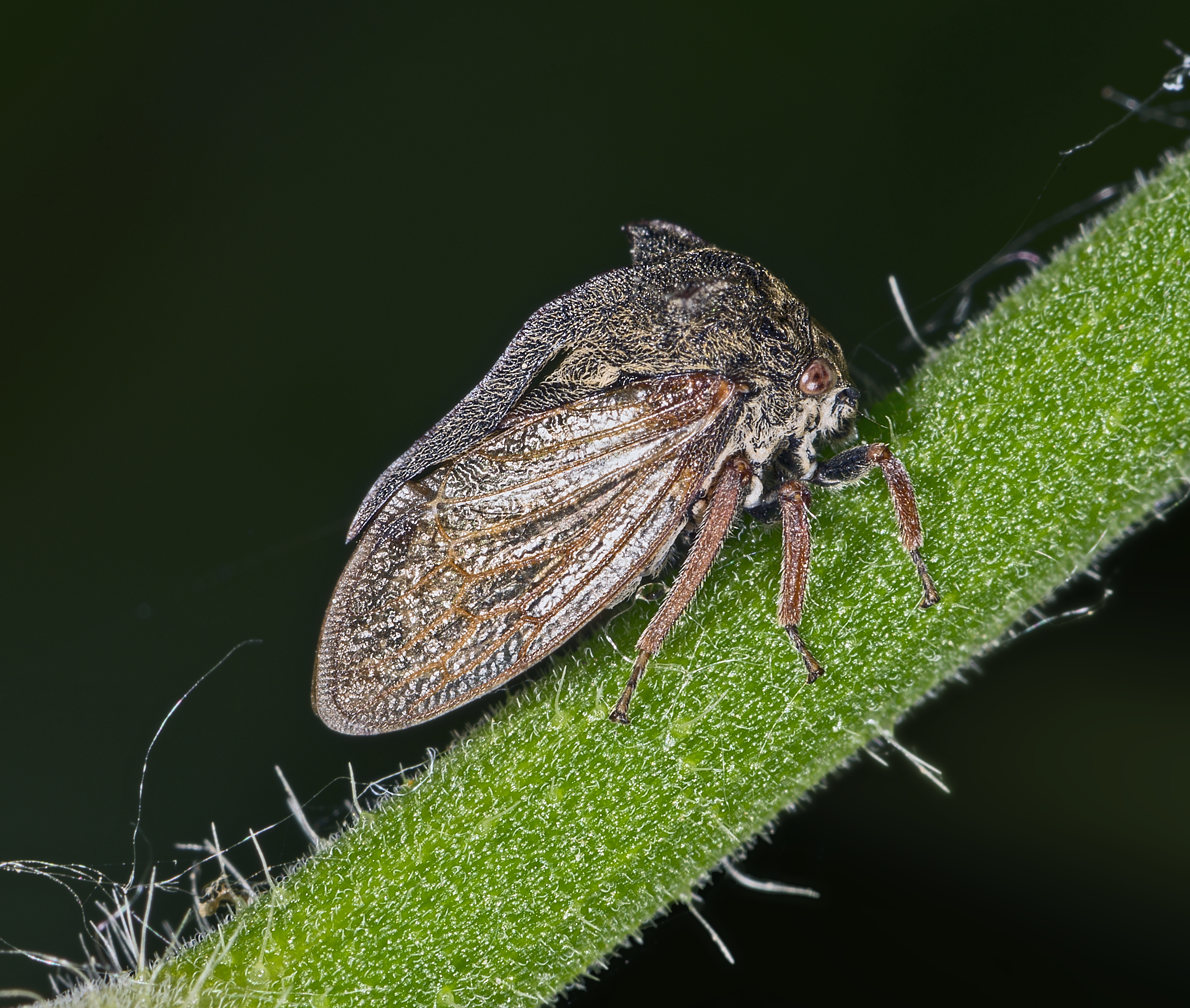
- Centrotus cornutus

Scientific classification
- Kingdom: Animalia
- Phylum: Arthropoda
- Class: Insecta
- Order: Hemiptera
- Suborder: Auchenorrhyncha
- Family: Membracidae
- Subfamily: Centrotinae
- Tribe: Centrotini
- Genus: Centrotus; Fabricius, 1803

= Centrotus =

Genus of insects

Centrotus is a genus of mostly Palaearctic treehoppers belonging to the family Membracidae. Common European species include the type species Centrotus cornutus (widespread including Scandinavia and the British Isles) and C. chloroticus (southern France and the Iberian peninsula).

== Species ==
The following species are recognised in this genus:

- Centrotus akonis Matsumura, 1912
- Centrotus albigutta Walker, 1870
- Centrotus albilatus Walker, 1870
- Centrotus altifrons Walker, 1851
- Centrotus angulata DeGeer, 1778
- Centrotus angustulus Melichar
- Centrotus arisanus Matsumura, 1912
- Centrotus atratus Walker, 1851
- Centrotus aurifascia Walker, 1851
- Centrotus basalis Walker, 1851
- Centrotus bicolor Walker, 1851
- Centrotus bioculatus Kirby
- Centrotus bipennis Walker, 1851
- Centrotus capreolus Walker, 1851
- Centrotus chloroticus Fairmaire, 1851
- Centrotus cicadiformis Walker, 1856
- Centrotus consocius Walker, 1856
- Centrotus contractus Walker, 1851
- Centrotus convergens Walker, 1851
- Centrotus cornutus Linnaeus, 1758
- Centrotus costalis Walker, 1851
- Centrotus cribratus Walker, 1851
- Centrotus decisus Walker, 1851
- Centrotus densus Walker, 1856
- Centrotus dilitatus Walker, 1851
- Centrotus doenitzae Matsumura, 1912
- Centrotus dorsalis Matsumura, 1912
- Centrotus erigens Walker, 1851
- Centrotus falcatus Walker, 1851
- Centrotus fasciatus Walker, 1852
- Centrotus finitimus Walker, 1851
- Centrotus flavivitta Walker, 1851
- Centrotus garampinus Matsumura, 1912
- Centrotus granulatus Kirby
- Centrotus guttulinervis Matsumura, 1912
- Centrotus horishanus Matsumura, 1912
- Centrotus horridulus Walker, 1851
- Centrotus ignipes Walker, 1851
- Centrotus indicus Ananthasubramanian, 1996
- Centrotus invarius Walker, 1851
- Centrotus jucundus Walker, 1851
- Centrotus kawakamii Matsumura, 1912
- Centrotus kelloggi Kato, 1928
- Centrotus kirschbaumi Metcalf, 1955
- Centrotus kosunensis Matsumura, 1912
- Centrotus kuyanianus Matsumura, 1912
- Centrotus latimargo Walker, 1856
- Centrotus latipennis Walker, 1851
- Centrotus laxatus Distant
- Centrotus leucopterus Thunberg, 1822
- Centrotus ligustri Matsumura, 1912
- Centrotus limbatus Walker, 1856
- Centrotus mairei Bergevin, 1932
- Centrotus malleator Walker, 1851
- Centrotus malleolus Walker, 1851
- Centrotus malleus Walker, 1851
- Centrotus matangensis Distant, 1916
- Centrotus megaceros Walker, 1851
- Centrotus mojiensis Matsumura, 1912
- Centrotus montifer Walker, 1851
- Centrotus nitobei Matsumura, 1912
- Centrotus pallidus Walker, 1851
- Centrotus percheroni Lethierry, 1888
- Centrotus pilosus Walker, 1851
- Centrotus platycerus Walker, 1851
- Centrotus pygmaeus Walker, 1851
- Centrotus ramosus Distant, 1908
- Centrotus rectidorsum Lethierry, 1888
- Centrotus rufiventris Walker, 1851
- Centrotus sinuatodorsum Lethierry, 1888
- Centrotus subsimilis Walker, 1856
- Centrotus substitutus Walker, 1851
- Centrotus talumensis Distant
- Centrotus tappanus Matsumura, 1912
- Centrotus taurifrons Walker, 1851
- Centrotus tenebrosus Walker, 1851
- Centrotus terminalis Walker, 1851
- Centrotus transiens Walker, 1851
- Centrotus tuberculatus Thunberg, 1822
- Centrotus variegatus Matsumura, 1912
- Centrotus varipes Walker, 1856
- Centrotus vicarius Walker, 1851
- Centrotus vitta Walker, 1851
- Centrotus zonatus Matsumura, 1912
