= Bleccia =

Scientific classification
- Kingdom: Animalia
- Phylum: Arthropoda
- Clade: Pancrustacea
- Class: Insecta
- Order: Hemiptera
- Suborder: Auchenorrhyncha
- Family: Membracidae
- Subfamily: Centrotinae
- Tribe: Centrotini
- Genus: Bleccia; Capener, 1968

Type species
- Bleccia fastidiosa Capener, 1955

Genus of insects

Bleccia is a genus of treehoppers in the subfamily Centrotinae. It was first described by Alfred Lawrence Capener in 1968. Species within this genus are found widely throughout Africa, including Tanzania, Democratic Republic of the Congo, and Sudan.

== Species ==
The following species are recognized:

- Bleccia fastidiosa Capener, 1955
- Bleccia inornata Capener, 1972
- Bleccia obscura Capener, 1968
