= Leprechaunus humilis =

Scientific classification
- Kingdom: Animalia
- Phylum: Arthropoda
- Clade: Pancrustacea
- Class: Insecta
- Order: Hemiptera
- Suborder: Auchenorrhyncha
- Family: Membracidae
- Genus: Leprechaunus
- Species: L. humilis

Binomial name
- Leprechaunus humilis Capener, 1972

Species of insect

Leprechaunus humilis is a species of treehoppers in the subfamily Centrotinae. It was first described by Alfred Lawrence Capener in 1972. It is found in South Africa, Zambia, and Democratic Republic of the Congo.
