= Dagonotus discolor =

Scientific classification
- Kingdom: Animalia
- Phylum: Arthropoda
- Clade: Pancrustacea
- Class: Insecta
- Order: Hemiptera
- Suborder: Auchenorrhyncha
- Family: Membracidae
- Genus: Dagonotus
- Species: D. discolor

Binomial name
- Dagonotus discolor Capener, 1972

Species of insect

Dagonotus discolor is a species of treehoppers in the subfamily Centrotinae described by Alfred Lawrence Capener in 1972. It is found in Tanzania and Mozambique.
