= Leprechaunus =

Scientific classification
- Kingdom: Animalia
- Phylum: Arthropoda
- Clade: Pancrustacea
- Class: Insecta
- Order: Hemiptera
- Suborder: Auchenorrhyncha
- Family: Membracidae
- Subfamily: Centrotinae
- Tribe: Centrotini
- Genus: Leprechaunus; Capener, 1950

Type species
- Leprechaunus cristatus Capener, 1950

Genus of insects

Leprechaunus is a genus of treehoppers in the subfamily Centrotinae first described by Alfred Lawrence Capener in 1950. The genus is believed to be closely related to the genus Promitor, but can be distinguished from members of Promitor mainly by the pattern of veins in their wings and by the shape of the projection on the back of the pronotum. Species within this genus are found in Sub-Saharan Africa.

== Species ==
The following species are recognized:

- Leprechaunus cornutus Capener, 1953
- Leprechaunus cristatus Capener, 1950
- Leprechaunus humilis Capener, 1972
- Leprechaunus longicornis Capener, 1972
- Leprechaunus nyassae Capener, 1972
