= Aurinotus auricornis =

Scientific classification
- Kingdom: Animalia
- Phylum: Arthropoda
- Clade: Pancrustacea
- Class: Insecta
- Order: Hemiptera
- Suborder: Auchenorrhyncha
- Family: Membracidae
- Genus: Aurinotus
- Species: A. auricornis

Binomial name
- Aurinotus auricornis Capener, 1960

Species of insect

Aurinotus auricornis is a species of treehoppers in the subfamily Centrotinae. It was first described by Alfred Lawrence Capener in 1960. It is found in South Africa.
