= Streonus tenebrosus =

Scientific classification
- Kingdom: Animalia
- Phylum: Arthropoda
- Clade: Pancrustacea
- Class: Insecta
- Order: Hemiptera
- Suborder: Auchenorrhyncha
- Family: Membracidae
- Genus: Streonus
- Species: S. tenebrosus

Binomial name
- Streonus tenebrosus Capener, 1954

Species of insect

Streonus tenebrosus is a species of treehoppers in the subfamily Centrotinae described by Alfred Lawrence Capener in 1954. It is found in Democratic Republic of the Congo.
