= Streonus =

Scientific classification
- Kingdom: Animalia
- Phylum: Arthropoda
- Clade: Pancrustacea
- Class: Insecta
- Order: Hemiptera
- Suborder: Auchenorrhyncha
- Family: Membracidae
- Subfamily: Centrotinae
- Tribe: Centrotini
- Genus: Streonus; Capener, 1968

Type species
- Streonus tenebrosus Capener, 1968

Genus of insects

Streonus is a genus of treehoppers in the subfamily Centrotinae. It was first described by Alfred Lawrence Capener in 1968. Species within this genus are found in Sub-Saharan Africa.

== Species ==
The following species are recognized:

- Streonus improcerus Capener, 1972
- Streonus tenebrosus Capener, 1954
