= Leprechaunus nyassae =

Scientific classification
- Kingdom: Animalia
- Phylum: Arthropoda
- Clade: Pancrustacea
- Class: Insecta
- Order: Hemiptera
- Suborder: Auchenorrhyncha
- Family: Membracidae
- Genus: Leprechaunus
- Species: L. nyassae

Binomial name
- Leprechaunus nyassae Capener, 1972

Species of insect

Leprechaunus nyassae is a species of treehopper in the subfamily Centrotinae first described by Alfred Lawrence Capener in 1972. It is found in Malawi.
