= Leprechaunus cornutus =

Scientific classification
- Kingdom: Animalia
- Phylum: Arthropoda
- Clade: Pancrustacea
- Class: Insecta
- Order: Hemiptera
- Suborder: Auchenorrhyncha
- Family: Membracidae
- Genus: Leprechaunus
- Species: L. cornutus

Binomial name
- Leprechaunus cornutus Capener, 1953

Species of insect

Leprechaunus cornutus is a species of treehoppers in the subfamily Centrotinae. It was first described by Alfred Lawrence Capener in 1953. It is found in Tanzania, Uganda, and Democratic Republic of the Congo.
