= Bleccia inornata =

Scientific classification
- Kingdom: Animalia
- Phylum: Arthropoda
- Clade: Pancrustacea
- Class: Insecta
- Order: Hemiptera
- Suborder: Auchenorrhyncha
- Family: Membracidae
- Genus: Bleccia
- Species: B. inornata

Binomial name
- Bleccia inornata Capener, 1972

Species of insect

Bleccia inornata is a species of treehoppers in the subfamily Centrotinae described by Alfred Lawrence Capener in 1972. It is found in Democratic Republic of the Congo.
