= Bleccia obscura =

Scientific classification
- Kingdom: Animalia
- Phylum: Arthropoda
- Clade: Pancrustacea
- Class: Insecta
- Order: Hemiptera
- Suborder: Auchenorrhyncha
- Family: Membracidae
- Genus: Bleccia
- Species: B. obscura

Binomial name
- Bleccia obscura Capener, 1968

Synonyms
- Bleccia obscurus

Species of insect

Bleccia obscura is a species of treehoppers in the subfamily Centrotinae described by Alfred Lawrence Capener in 1968. It is found in Sudan.
