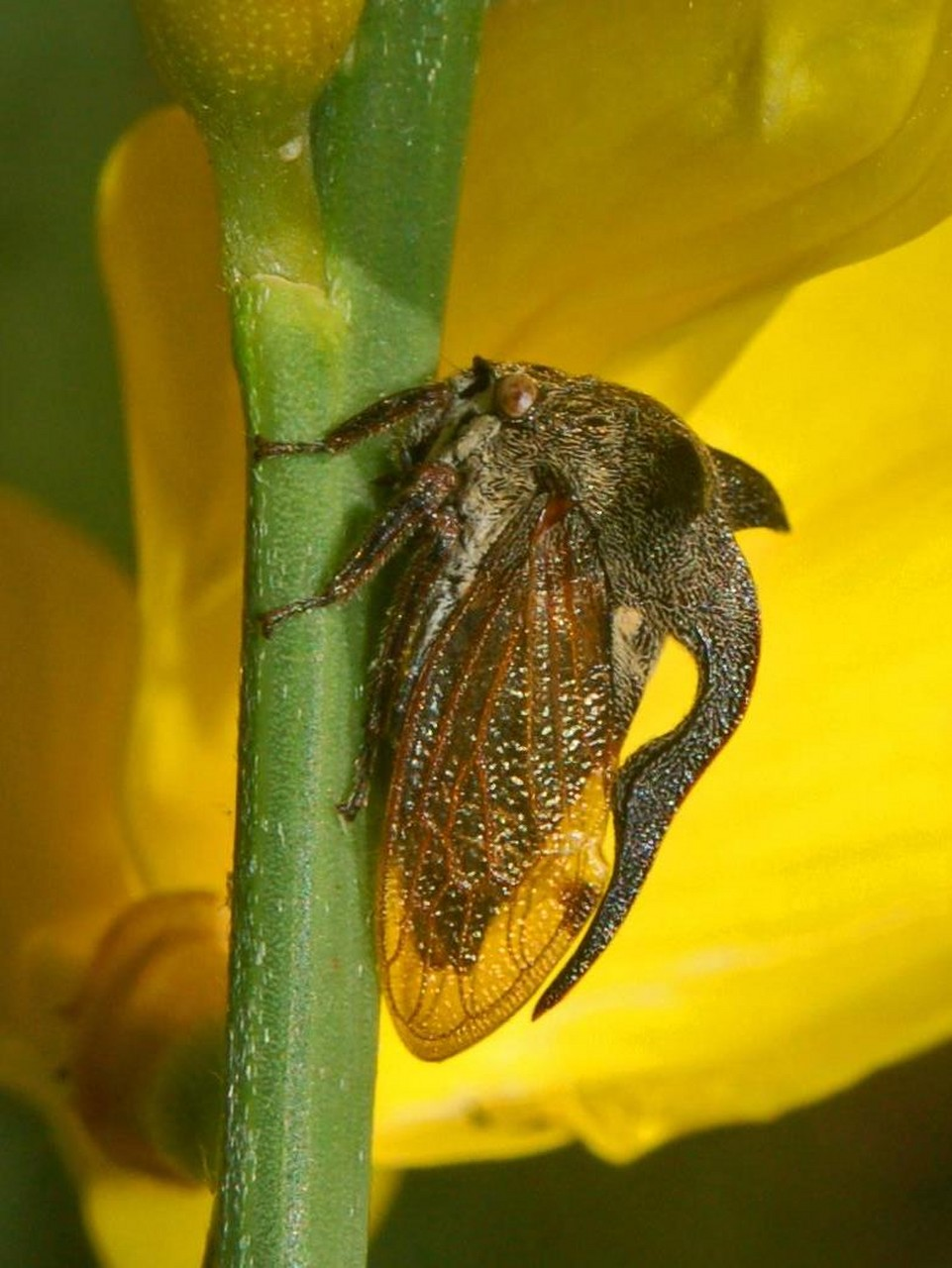
- Centrotus cornutus on Spanish Broom (Genista juncea)

Scientific classification
- Kingdom: Animalia
- Phylum: Arthropoda
- Class: Insecta
- Order: Hemiptera
- Suborder: Auchenorrhyncha
- Family: Membracidae
- Genus: Centrotus
- Species: C. cornutus

Binomial name
- Centrotus cornutus (Linnaeus, 1758)

= Centrotus cornutus =

Species of true bug

Centrotus cornutus (thorn-hopper) is a species of "treehoppers" belonging to the family Membracidae.

== Distribution ==
This species is present in most of Europe, in the eastern Palearctic realm and in the Near East. It is one of only two UK treehoppers.

== Habitat ==
These thorn-hoppers inhabit woodlands, beech forests, hedge rows and moderately moist or dry areas.

== Description ==
The adult males reach 7–10 millimetres (0.28–0.39 in) in length, while females are slightly larger. The basic colouration of the stocky body is dark-brown. The large protruding eyes are round and reddish-brown to red. The pronotum is hairy, arched up and pulled back in a long, wave-shaped extension above the wings, with two sharp, ear-shaped lateral protrusions (hence the Latin name cornutus, meaning "horned"). The legs are very short. The front wings are pale brown and translucent, with evident brown veins.

The bizarre horn-like extensions of the pronotum apparently help the camouflage. As a matter of fact, when this insect is at rest on a branch with the legs retracted, it looks like a part of the branch itself.

This species is rather similar to Gargara genistae, the second UK species of treehoppers, that lacks the horn-like protrusions, has a shorter extension above the wings and it is associated with broom.

== Biology ==
They can be encountered from early May through early August. Both males and females produce vibrational signals during courtship and they are able to jump as orthoptera. After mating at the end of June and early July the females lay several eggs in the stalk of herbaceous plants, on which hatching larvae feed. These "treehoppers" are polyphagous, feeding on plant juices, which they take with their specially built, piercing-sucking mouth parts. The larvae mainly live on Cirsium, Carduus and Urtica species, while the adult insects prefer Populus, Quercus and Rubus species. They overwinter in the litter layer in the larval stage and have a two-year life cycle.

== Gallery ==
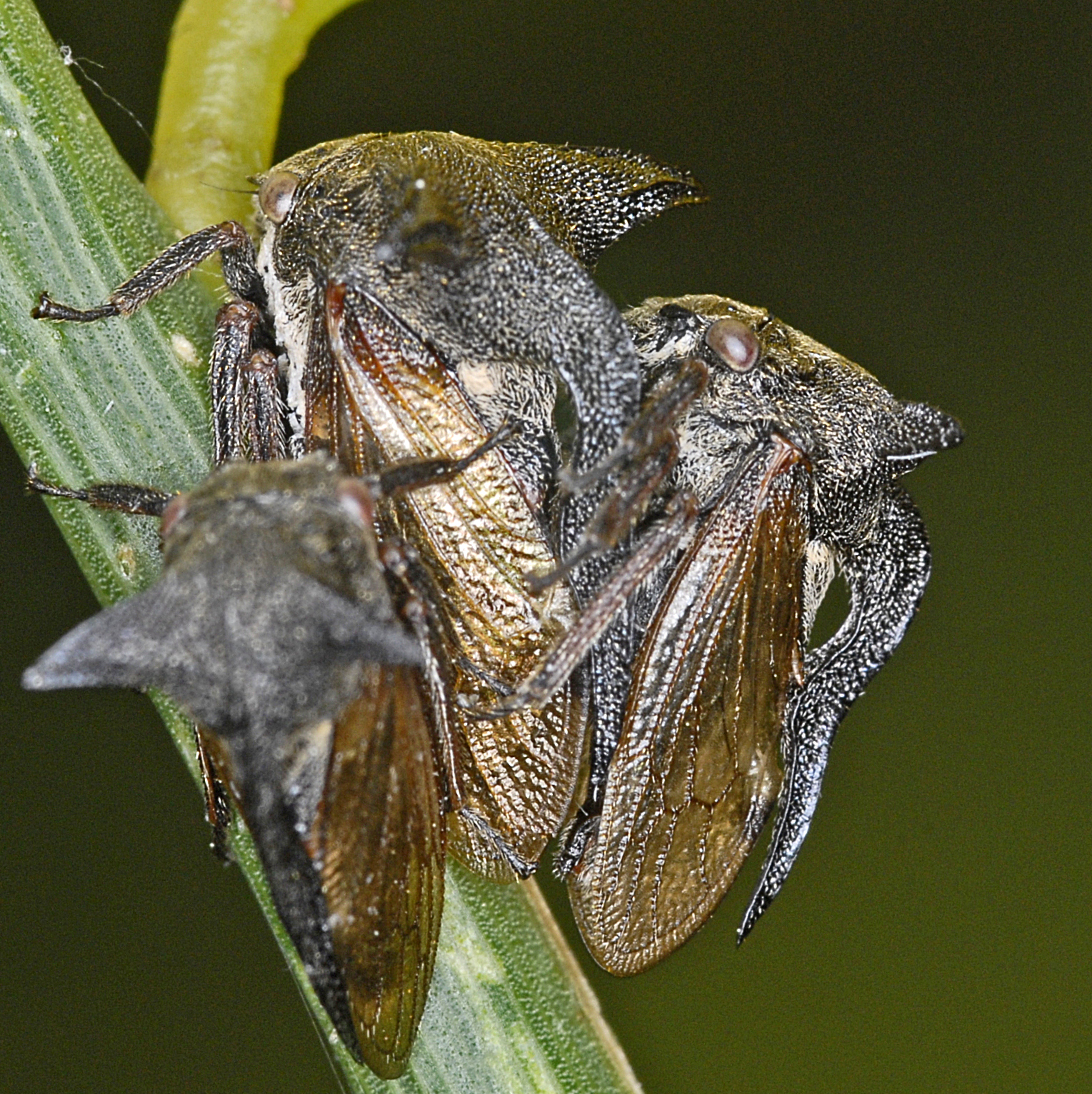
Mating pair

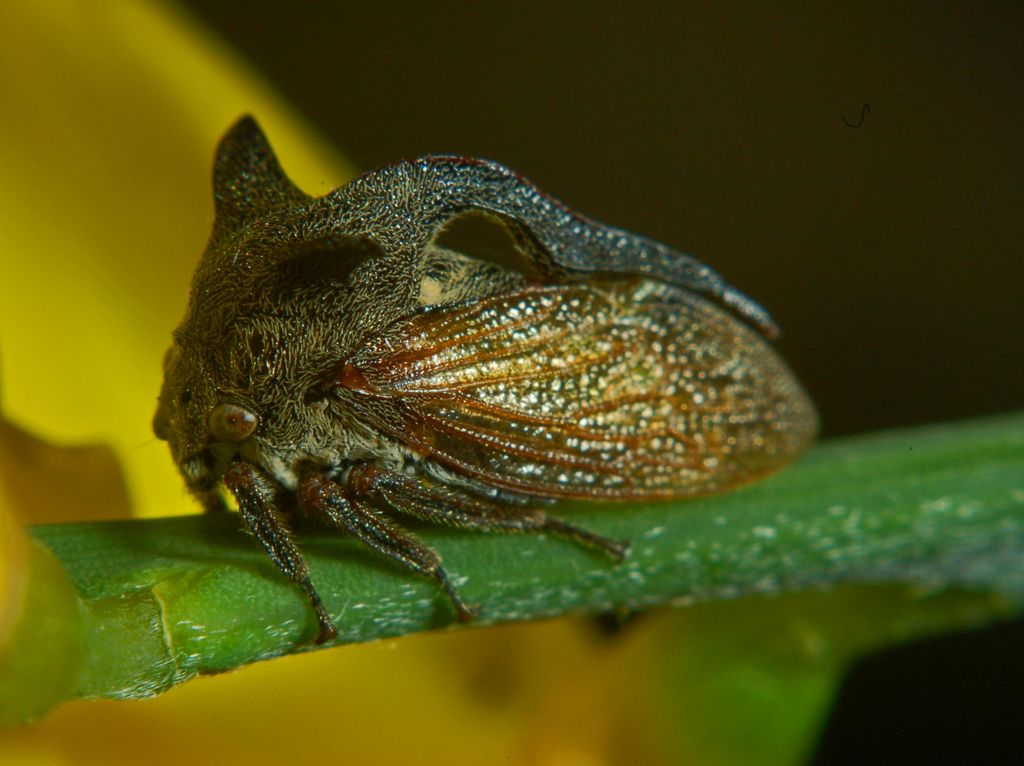
Side view

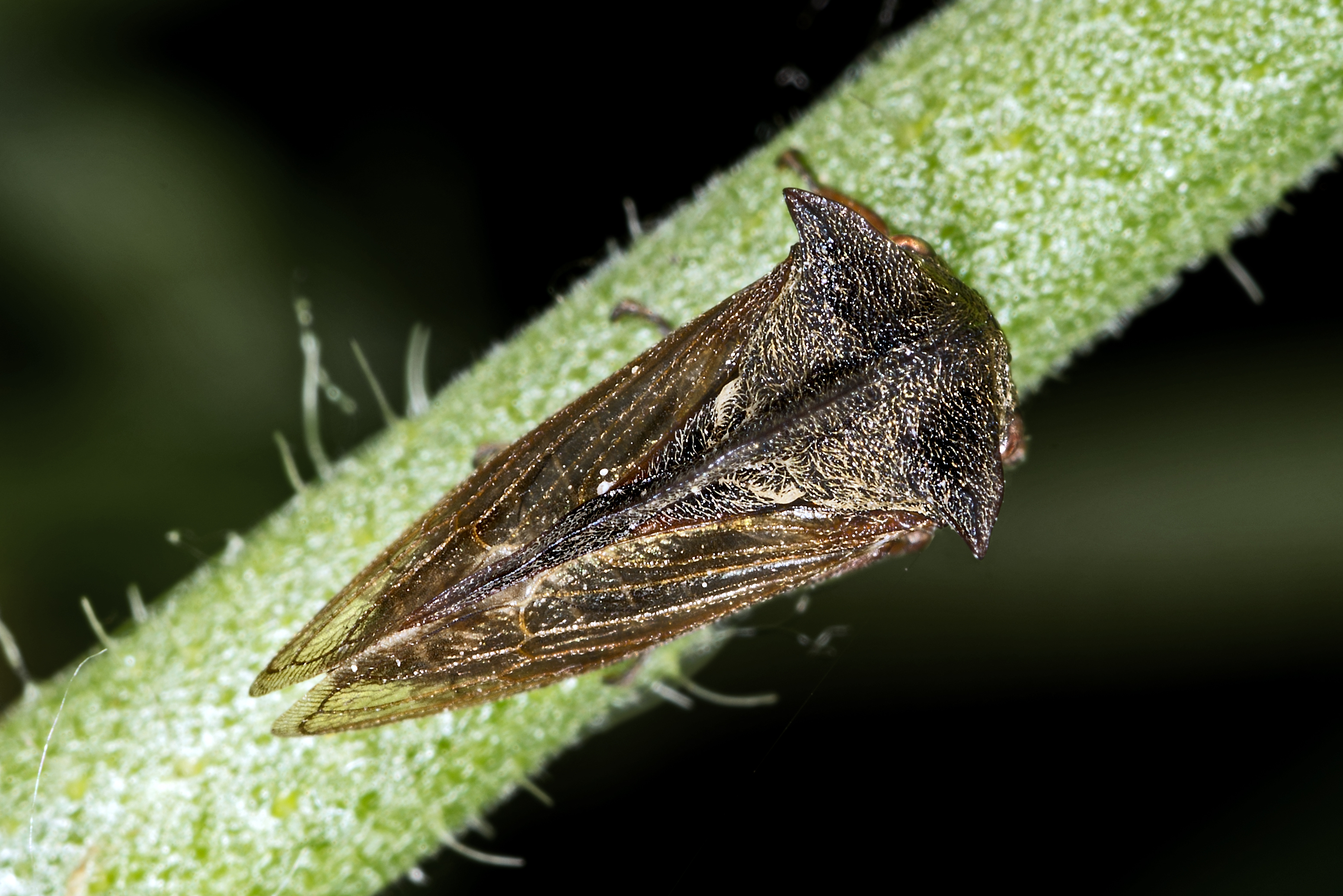
Upperside

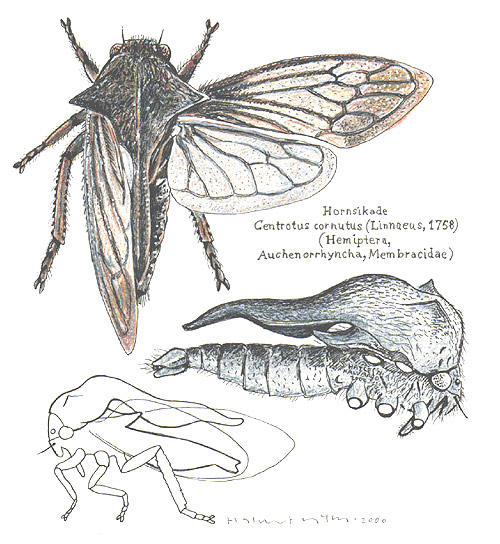
A drawing of a Centrotus cornutus
