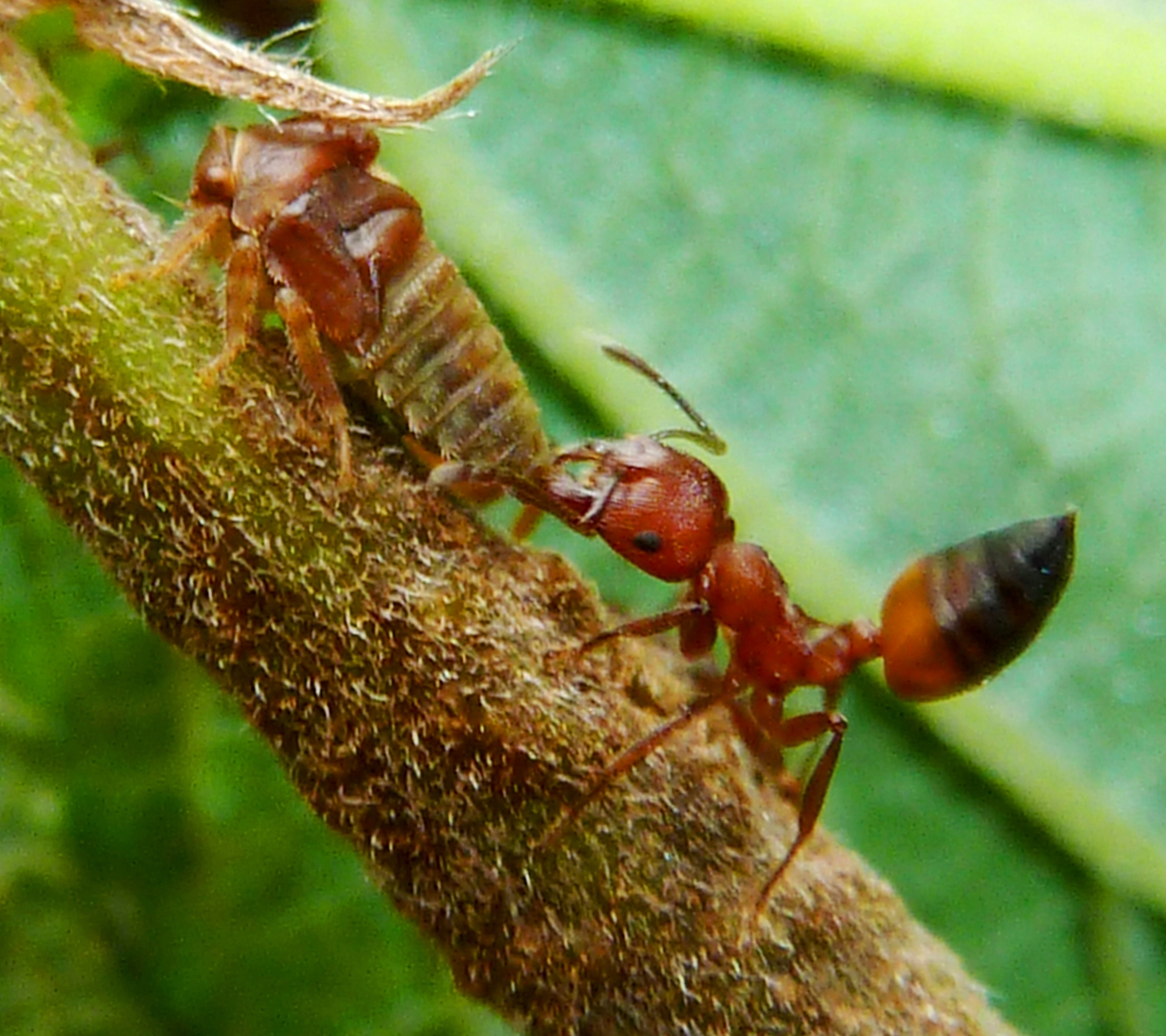
- Worker with treehopper nymph
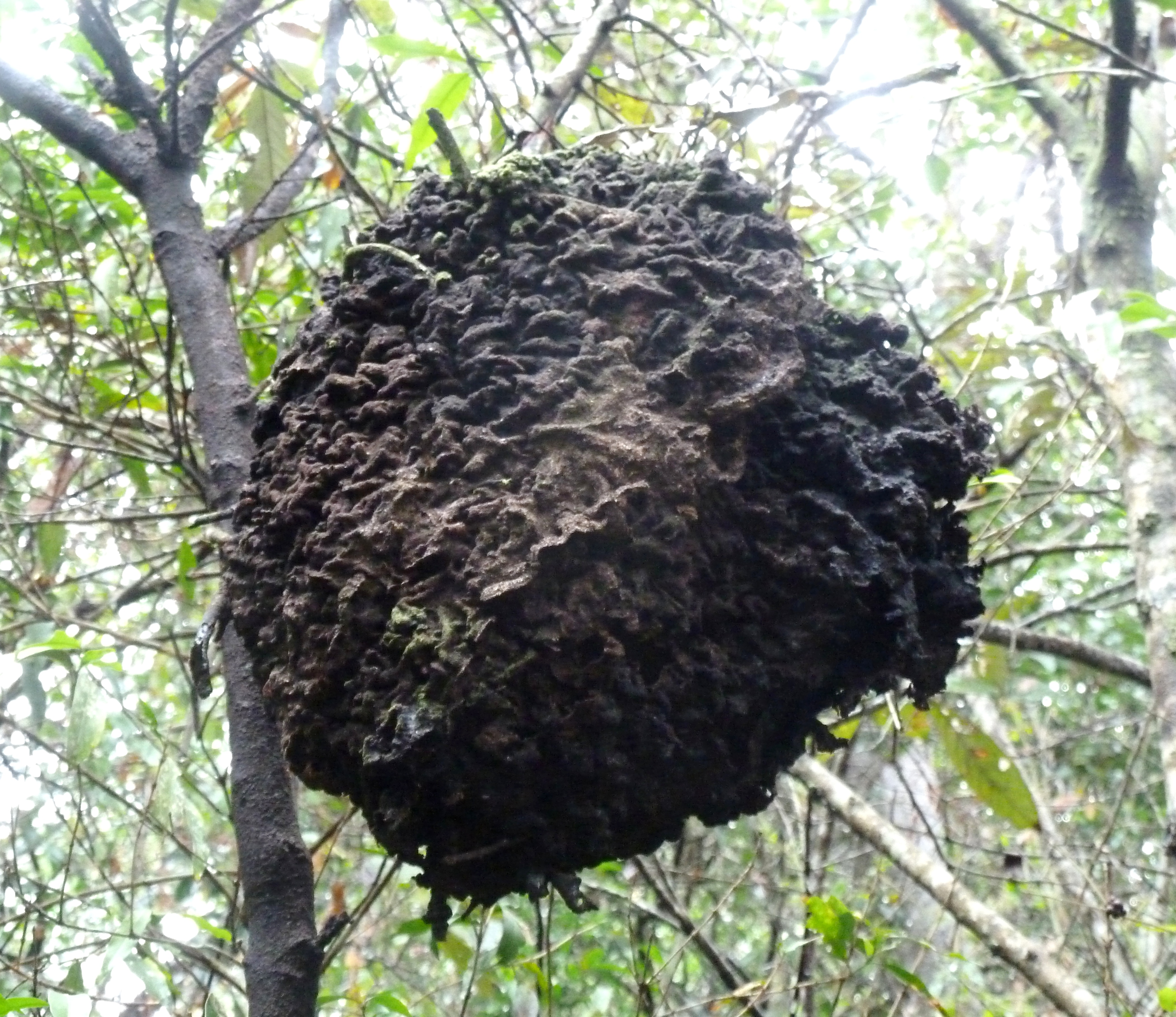
- A colony's arboreal carton nest

Scientific classification
- Domain: Eukaryota
- Kingdom: Animalia
- Phylum: Arthropoda
- Class: Insecta
- Order: Hymenoptera
- Family: Formicidae
- Subfamily: Myrmicinae
- Genus: Crematogaster
- Species: C. castanea

Binomial name
- Crematogaster castanea F.Smith, 1858

= Crematogaster castanea =

Red cocktail ant

Species of ant

Crematogaster castanea is a species of ant in tribe Crematogastrini. It was described by Smith in 1858.

== Subspecies ==
There are 20 named subspecies:

- C. c. adusta
- C. c. analis
- C. c. aquila
- C. c. arborea
- C. c. bruta
- C. c. busschodtsi
- C. c. castanea
- C. c. durbanensis
- C. c. ferruginea
- C. c. hararica
- C. c. insidiosa
- C. c. inversa
- C. c. mediorufa
- C. c. museisapientiae
- C. c. rufimembrum
- C. c. rufonigra
- C. c. simia
- C. c. tricolor
- C. c. ulugurensis
- C. c. yambatensis
