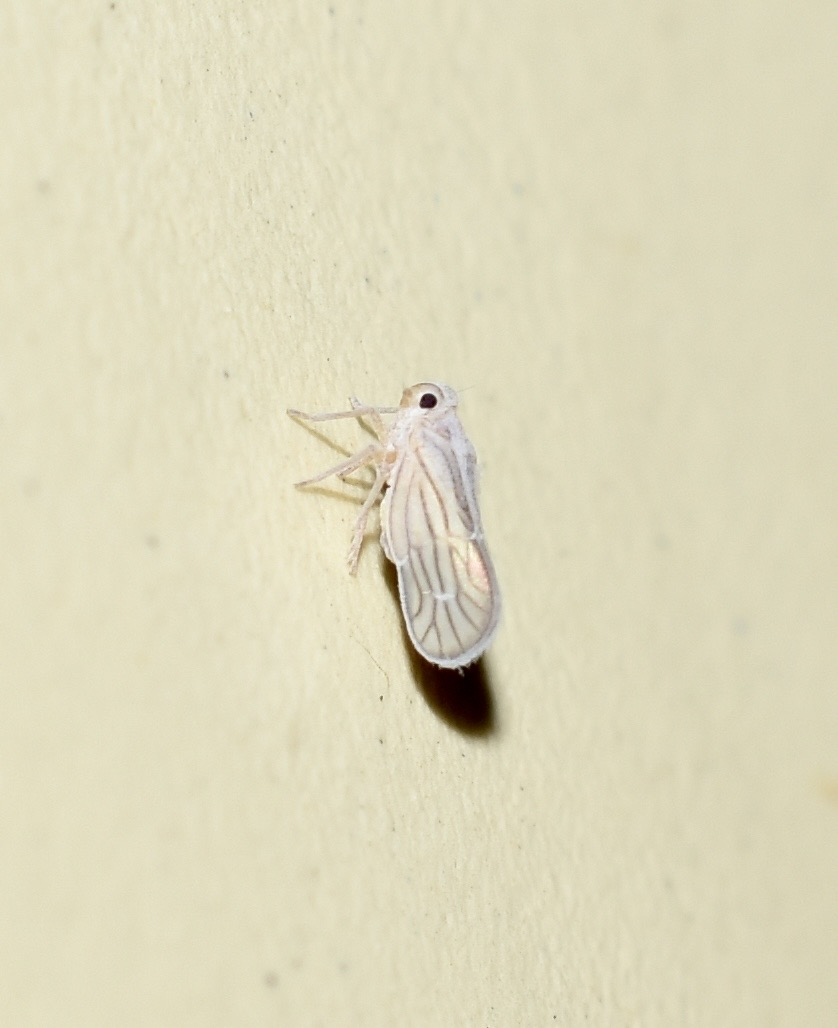
- Nisia nervosa in Mirissa, Sri Lanka

Scientific classification
- Kingdom: Animalia
- Phylum: Arthropoda
- Class: Insecta
- Order: Hemiptera
- Suborder: Auchenorrhyncha
- Infraorder: Fulgoromorpha
- Family: Meenoplidae
- Genus: Nisia
- Species: N. nervosa

Binomial name
- Nisia nervosa (Motschulsky, 1863)

Synonyms
- Livilla nervosa Motschulsky, 1863

= Nisia nervosa =

Species of planthopper

Nisia nervosa is a species of planthopper in the family Meenoplidae found in Asia and parts of Africa. It is considered a pest for many cultivated plants.

== Description ==
Adults' body length including the forewings, is 3.5–4.2 mm for males and 4-4.5 mm for females. The forewing length is 3–3.6 mm for males and 3.5–4 mm for females.

The head is short, with the eyes distinctly narrower than the pronotum. The vertex has two widely separated triangular posterolateral areolets. The frons is longer than its widest part, and longer than the clypeus medially.

In males, the anal segment in dorsal view has nearly parallel lateral margins, each with a finger-like lateroapical process. The aedeagus is short, broad, flattened, and apically strongly deflexed. The genital styles are angulately curved at the middle.

== Distribution ==
Nisia nervosa has a wide distribution across South, East and Southeast Asia, the Middle East (including the United Arab Emirates and Israel), Iran and Africa.

== Host plants ==
This species is known to feed on a range of host plants, including several important crops: Citrus spp., Hordeum sativum (barley), Oryza sativa (rice), Panicum miliaceum (proso millet), Saccharum officinarum (sugarcane), Solanum tuberosum (potato), and Triticum aestivum (wheat).
