= Nisia atrovenosa =

Scientific classification
- Kingdom: Animalia
- Phylum: Arthropoda
- Class: Insecta
- Order: Hemiptera
- Suborder: Auchenorrhyncha
- Infraorder: Fulgoromorpha
- Family: Meenoplidae
- Genus: Nisia
- Species: N. atrovenosa

Binomial name
- Nisia atrovenosa (Lethierry, 1888)

Species of true bug

Nisia atrovenosa is a species of true bug in the family Meenoplidae. It is a pest of millets such as sorghum. Its predators include the mirid bug Cyrtorhinus lividipennis.
