= Tettigometra =

Scientific classification
- Kingdom: Animalia
- Phylum: Arthropoda
- Class: Insecta
- Order: Hemiptera
- Suborder: Auchenorrhyncha
- Infraorder: Fulgoromorpha
- Family: Tettigometridae
- Genus: Tettigometra; Latreille, 1804

Genus of true bugs

Tettigometra is a genus of true bugs belonging to the family Tettigometridae.

The species of this genus are found in Eurasia. Tettigometra impressopunctata is found in chalk downland and calcareous dunes of southern England and Wales.

== Species ==
The Global Biodiversity Information Facility lists:

- Tettigometra afra Kirschbaum, 1868
- Tettigometra angulata Lindberg, 1948
- others ...
