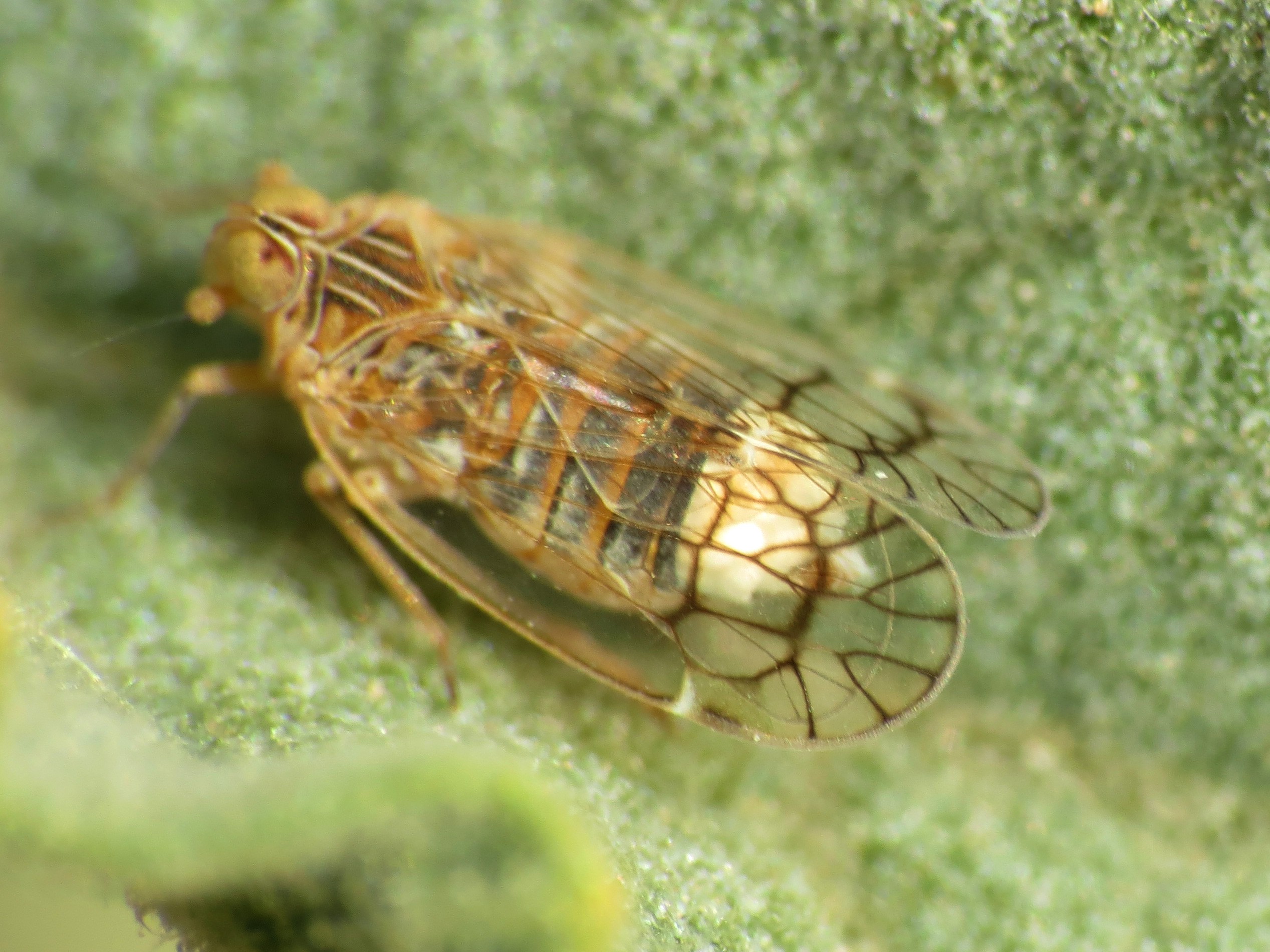
- Oeclidius, Tucson, Arizona

Scientific classification
- Domain: Eukaryota
- Kingdom: Animalia
- Phylum: Arthropoda
- Class: Insecta
- Order: Hemiptera
- Suborder: Auchenorrhyncha
- Infraorder: Fulgoromorpha
- Family: Kinnaridae
- Genus: Oeclidius; Van Duzee, 1914

= Oeclidius =

Genus of true bugs

Oeclidius is a genus of kinnarid planthoppers in the family Kinnaridae. There are at least 20 described species in Oeclidius.

== Species ==
These 23 species belong to the genus Oeclidius:

- Oeclidius aboraca Fieber, 1980^{c g}
- Oeclidius antricola Fennah, 1980^{c g}
- Oeclidius browni Bourgoin & Lefebvre, 2002^{c g}
- Oeclidius carolus Ball, 1934^{c g}
- Oeclidius conopa Fennah, 1980^{c g}
- Oeclidius fraternus Van Duzee, 1923^{c g b}
- Oeclidius fulgidus (Van Duzee, 1907)^{c g}
- Oeclidius fuscosus (Van Duzee, 1907)^{c g}
- Oeclidius hades Fennah, 1973^{c g}
- Oeclidius hanabanillae Myers, 1928^{c g}
- Oeclidius koebelei Muir, 1934^{c g}
- Oeclidius luizi (Myers, 1928)^{c g}
- Oeclidius minos Fennah, 1980^{c g}
- Oeclidius nanus Van Duzee, 1914^{c g b}
- Oeclidius nimbus Ball, 1934^{c g}
- Oeclidius parallelus Muir, 1934^{c g}
- Oeclidius pelagon Fennah, 1980^{c g}
- Oeclidius persephone Fennah, 1980^{c g}
- Oeclidius princeps Fennah, 1980^{c g}
- Oeclidius salaco Emeljanov & Shcherbakov, 2000^{c g}
- Oeclidius tenellus (Fowler, 1904)^{c g}
- Oeclidius transversus Ball, 1934^{c g}
- Oeclidius trinitatis Myers, 1928^{c g}

Data sources: i = ITIS, c = Catalogue of Life, g = GBIF, b = Bugguide.net
