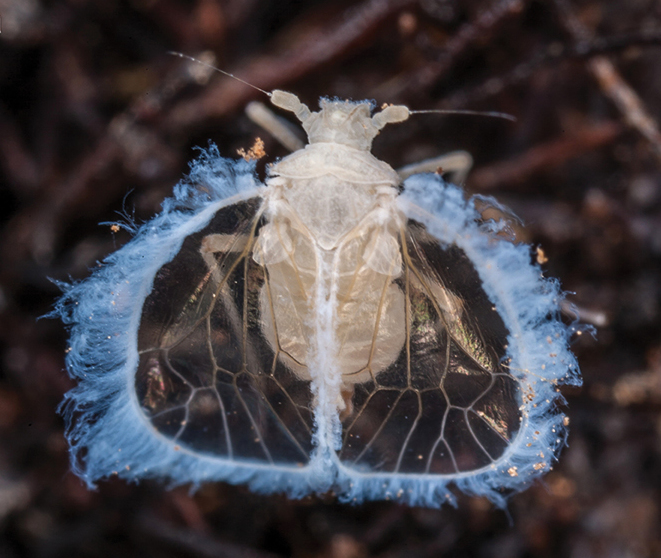
- Valenciolenda fadaforesta adult male

Scientific classification
- Domain: Eukaryota
- Kingdom: Animalia
- Phylum: Arthropoda
- Class: Insecta
- Order: Hemiptera
- Suborder: Auchenorrhyncha
- Infraorder: Fulgoromorpha
- Family: Kinnaridae
- Genus: Valenciolenda; Hoch & Sendra, 2021
- Species: V. fadaforesta

Binomial name
- Valenciolenda fadaforesta Hoch & Sendra, 2021

= Valenciolenda =

Genus of wasps

Valenciolenda is a cavernicolous monotypic genus of planthopper in the family Kinnaridae. Valenciolenda fadaforesta is a peculiar species of hemptiran, as it is the only representative of its family in the Old World. Moreover it's the seventh cavernicolous Kinnarid and only the third troglobitic planthopper discovered around the Mediterranean.

== Description ==
Valenciolenda fadaforesta is a small insect measuring about 3-4 mm in length. It is adapted to the cave environment in which it lives. It has lost its compound eyes and ocelli and has only weak pigmentation on its body. The wings and tegmina are reduced. This planthopper probably feeds on the plant roots that can be found hanging from the ceiling. The animal probably lives most of the time inside interstitial spaces of the cave system near this roots. It is unable to fly but can escape predators by jumping several centimeters, it can use the flat tegmina as a parachutes to slow down.

== Etymology ==
The genus is a combination of Valencia (the type locality) and the tribe Adolendini. The species name is a combination of the Valencian word for "fairy" (fada) and forest meaning "fairy of the forest".

== Distribution ==
Specimens of Valenciolenda have been observed in six caves in the Valencian Community in Spain. It is regarded as a relict species as it has no geographically close relative.
