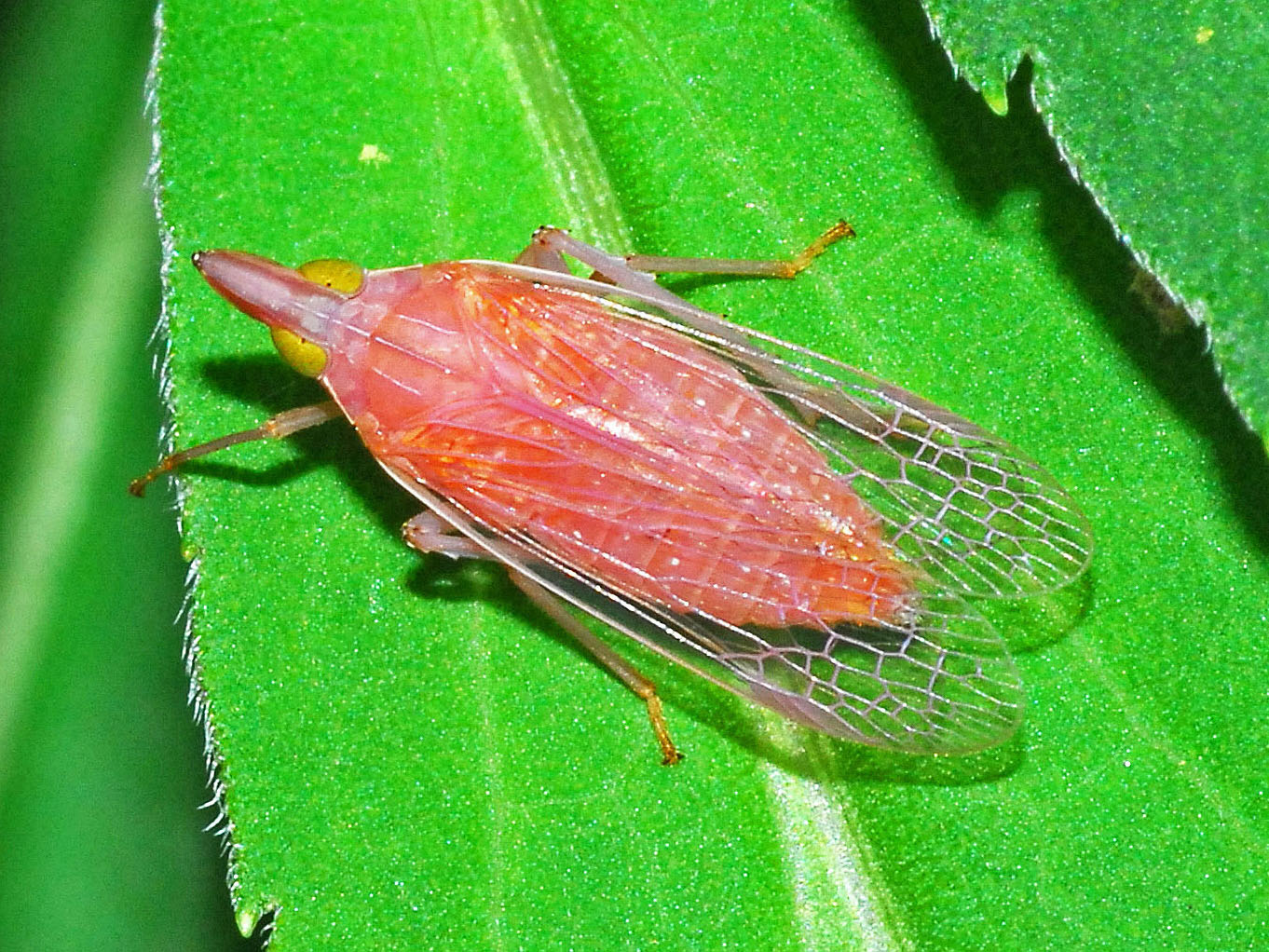
- Dictyophara europaea

Scientific classification
- Domain: Eukaryota
- Kingdom: Animalia
- Phylum: Arthropoda
- Class: Insecta
- Order: Hemiptera
- Suborder: Auchenorrhyncha
- Infraorder: Fulgoromorpha
- Family: Dictyopharidae
- Tribe: Dictyopharini
- Genus: Dictyophara; Germar, 1833

Synonyms
- include (also other misspellings): Pseudophana Burmeister, 1835; Avephora Bierman, 1910; Dictyophora Germar, 1833; Togaphora Matsumura, 1940; Avephora Bierman, 1910

= Dictyophara =

Genus of planthoppers

Dictyophara is the type genus of planthoppers belonging to the family Dictyopharidae and tribe Dictyopharini, containing five subgenera. The scientific genus name Dictyophara derives from the Greek (dictyon: net and phorein: wear) and can be translated "who wears a net".

== Species ==
FLOW lists the following, from Africa, Europe, Asia and Australia:

Dictyophara (Ancylocrius) Emeljanov, 2003 (Middle East)

1. Dictyophara albata Dlabola & Heller, 1962
2. Dictyophara exoptata Dlabola & Heller, 1962
3. Dictyophara nizipa Dlabola, 1986
4. Dictyophara tanghigaruha Dlabola, 1957

Dictyophara (Chanithus) Kolenati, 1857

1. Dictyophara avocetta Oshanin, 1879
2. Dictyophara compacta Linnavuori, 1962
3. Dictyophara eifeliana Dlabola, 1994
4. Dictyophara infumata (de Bergevin, 1916)
5. Dictyophara longirostris Walker, 1851
6. Dictyophara merjensis Linnavuori, 1965
7. Dictyophara pales Linnavuori, 1970
8. Dictyophara pannonica (Germar, 1830)
9. Dictyophara scolopax Oshanin, 1879
10. Dictyophara validicornis (Stål, 1859)
11. Dictyophara xiphias Puton, 1884

Dictyophara (Conopenchus) Emeljanov, 2003

1. Dictyophara lodosi (Dlabola, 1979)
2. Dictyophara pales Linnavuori, 1970
3. Dictyophara pazukii (Dlabola, 1984)

Dictyophara (Dictyophara) Germar, 1833

1. Dictyophara eremica Linnavuori, 1962
2. Dictyophara europaea (Linné, 1767) - type species (synonym D. asiatica Melichar, 1912)
3. Dictyophara lindbergi Metcalf, 1955
4. Dictyophara subsimilis Linnavuori, 1953

Dictyophara (Euthremma) Emeljanov, 2003

1. Dictyophara anatina Puton, 1890
2. Dictyophara bergevini Metcalf, 1946
3. Dictyophara curvata Matsumura, 1910
4. Dictyophara hoberlandti Dlabola, 1974
5. Dictyophara lallemandi de Bergevin, 1921
6. Dictyophara multireticulata Mulsant & Rey, 1855
7. Dictyophara multireticulata sulphuricollis Rey, 1894
8. Dictyophara obtusiceps Lethierry, 1889

subgenus not determined

1. Dictyophara abrupta Shakila, 1984
2. Dictyophara affinis Spinola, 1839
3. Dictyophara afghana Dlabola, 1986
4. Dictyophara amaranthusae Shakila, 1984
5. Dictyophara anwari Shakila, 1984
6. Dictyophara asperae Shakila, 1984
7. Dictyophara balakotensis Shakila, 1984
8. Dictyophara borneides (Kirkaldy, 1913)
9. Dictyophara bovina (Stål, 1862)
10. Dictyophara cephalolineata Shakila, 1984
11. Dictyophara cephalorobusta Shakila, 1984
12. Dictyophara concolor Walker, 1851
13. Dictyophara confusa (Stål, 1862)
14. Dictyophara constricta Shakila, 1984
15. Dictyophara cribrata Walker, 1870
16. Dictyophara cyrnea Spinola, 1839
17. Dictyophara distincta Melichar, 1912
18. Dictyophara fangigharuha Dlabola, 1957
19. Dictyophara flavicostata Jacobi, 1943
20. Dictyophara frontalis Melichar, 1912
21. Dictyophara glaucides (Kirkaldy, 1913)
22. Dictyophara greeni Shakila, 1984
23. Dictyophara herbida Walker, 1851
24. Dictyophara inscia Walker, 1858
25. Dictyophara iracina Dlabola, 1989
26. Dictyophara karachiensis Shakila, 1984
27. Dictyophara koreana Matsumura, 1915
28. Dictyophara kotoshonis Matsumura, 1940
29. Dictyophara lobosa Shakila, 1984
30. Dictyophara longirostrata Kato, 1933
31. Dictyophara lyallpurensis Shakila, 1984
32. Dictyophara macaonica (Kirkaldy, 1913)
33. Dictyophara manchurica (Kato, 1932)
34. Dictyophara mianiensis Shakila, 1984
35. Dictyophara minuta Shakila, 1984
36. Dictyophara misionensis Jensen-Haarup, 1920
37. Dictyophara nekkana Matsumura, 1940
38. Dictyophara nigrimacula Walker, 1851
39. Dictyophara nigromaculata Walker, 1851
40. Dictyophara nigrovittata Matsumura, 1913
41. Dictyophara nilgiriensis Distant, 1906
42. Dictyophara okinawensis Matsumura, 1906
43. Dictyophara orangica Shakila, 1984
44. Dictyophara ornata Lallemand, 1942
45. Dictyophara pakistana Dlabola, 1986
46. Dictyophara palisoti Metcalf, 1946
47. Dictyophara pallida Walker, 1851
48. Dictyophara peshawarensis Shakila, 1984
49. Dictyophara picta Walker, 1858
50. Dictyophara pirawalensis Shakila, 1984
51. Dictyophara prasina Melichar, 1912
52. Dictyophara qummari Shakila, 1984
53. Dictyophara sacchari Shakila, 1984
54. Dictyophara sativae Shakila, 1984
55. Dictyophara sauropsis Walker, 1862
56. Dictyophara seladonica Melichar, 1912
57. Dictyophara sindensis Shakila, 1984
58. Dictyophara sordida Jensen-Haarup, 1920
59. Dictyophara spinosa Shakila, 1984
60. Dictyophara spuria Stål, 1859
61. Dictyophara sumatrana Lallemand, 1931
62. Dictyophara vishneviensis† (Becker-Migdisova, 1964)
63. Dictyophara zeae Shakila, 1984
