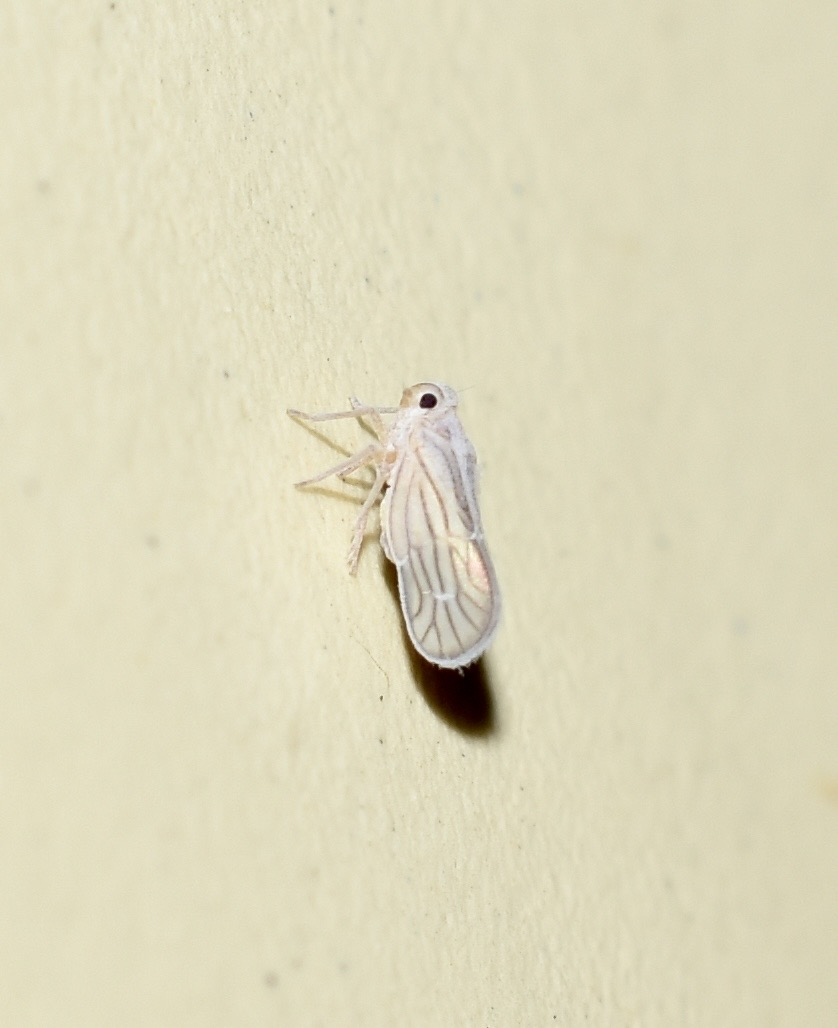
- Nisia nervosa in Mirissa, Sri Lanka

Scientific classification
- Kingdom: Animalia
- Phylum: Arthropoda
- Class: Insecta
- Order: Hemiptera
- Suborder: Auchenorrhyncha
- Infraorder: Fulgoromorpha
- Family: Meenoplidae
- Genus: Nisia; Melichar, 1903

= Nisia =

Genus of true bugs

Nisia is a genus of planthoppers in the family Meenoplidae. Species in the genus are known from Africa, Asia and Australia. Most species are associated with monocotyledonous host plants, particularly sedges in the family Cyperaceae.

== Species ==
BioLib lists following 23 species as belonging to Nisia:

Nisia alba Melichar, 1914

Nisia albinotata Muir, 1927

Nisia albovenosa Distant, 1906

Nisia atrovenosa (Lethierry, 1888)

Nisia australiensis Woodward, 1957

Nisia buxtoni Muir, 1931

Nisia campbelli Distant, 1916

Nisia carolinensis Fennah, 1971

Nisia dammermani Muir, 1930

Nisia fuliginosa Yang & Hu, 1985

Nisia fuscofasciata Distant, 1917

Nisia grandiceps Kirkaldy, 1906

Nisia langlei (Muir, 1921)

Nisia maculosa Distant, 1917

Nisia minor Lindberg, 1958

Nisia nebulosa Lindberg, 1958

Nisia nervosa (Motschulsky, 1863)

Nisia psylla Bierman, 1910

Nisia serrata Tsaur, 1989

Nisia striata Yang & Hu, 1985

Nisia subfogo Hoch, Oromi & Arechavaleta, 1999

Nisia sulphurata Distant, 1917

Nisia thoracica Distant, 1917

Nisia nitida was moved to the Phaconeura genus as Phaconeura nitida.
