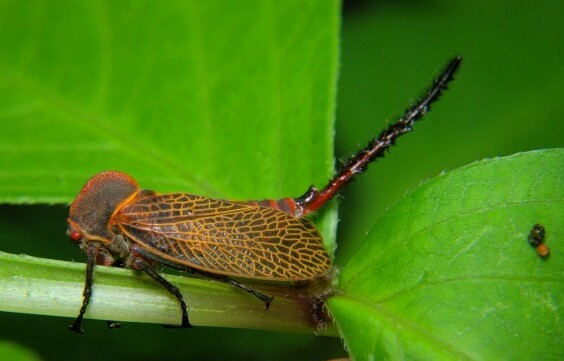
- Darthula hardwickii

Scientific classification
- Kingdom: Animalia
- Phylum: Arthropoda
- Class: Insecta
- Order: Hemiptera
- Suborder: Auchenorrhyncha
- Family: Aetalionidae
- Genus: Darthula; Kirkaldy, 1900

Type species
- Urophora hardwicki Gray, 1832

Synonyms
- Urophora Gray, 1832

= Darthula =

Genus of insects

Darthula is a genus of treehopper and is the only Old World representative of the family Aetalionidae. Two species are known from the Himalayas, Darthula hardwickii and Darthula xizangensis. Darthula hardwickii is found in parts of northeastern India and is traditionally eaten in Nagaland.
