= Biturritia =

Scientific classification
- Kingdom: Animalia
- Phylum: Arthropoda
- Clade: Pancrustacea
- Class: Insecta
- Order: Hemiptera
- Suborder: Auchenorrhyncha
- Family: Aetalionidae
- Genus: Biturritia; Goding, 1930

Species
- Biturritia capreolus (Germar 1821); Biturritia vacca (Germar 1821)

Genus of insect

Biturritia is a genus of Treehoppers belonging to the family Aetalionidae. It is found in South America.
