= Mina (bug) =

Scientific classification
- Domain: Eukaryota
- Kingdom: Animalia
- Phylum: Arthropoda
- Class: Insecta
- Order: Hemiptera
- Suborder: Auchenorrhyncha
- Family: Aetalionidae
- Genus: Mina; Walker, 1858

Genus of insects

Mina is a genus of treehoppers in the family Aetalionidae. It contains two species, Mina aliena and Mina stylata.
