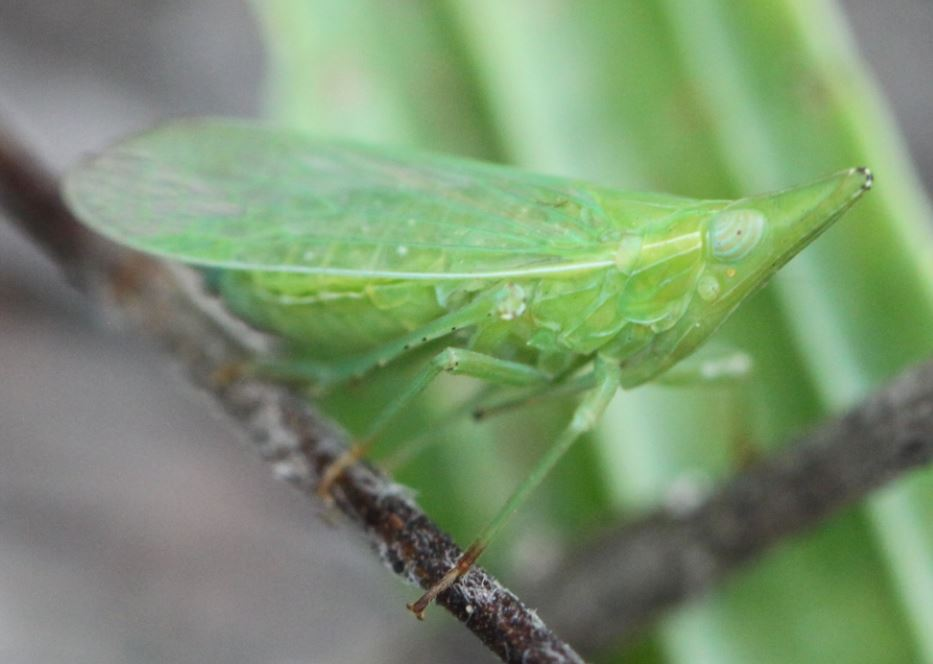
- Dictyophara europaea

Scientific classification
- Kingdom: Animalia
- Phylum: Arthropoda
- Class: Insecta
- Order: Hemiptera
- Suborder: Auchenorrhyncha
- Infraorder: Fulgoromorpha
- Family: Dictyopharidae
- Subfamily: Dictyopharinae
- Tribe: Dictyopharini
- Genus: Dictyophara
- Species: D. europaea

Binomial name
- Dictyophara europaea (Linnaeus, 1767)

Synonyms
- Dictyophara (Dictyophara) italica Kirschbaum, 1868; Dictyophara asiatica Melichar, 1912); Fulgora europaea Linnaeus, 1767; Epiptera europaea (Linnaeus, 1767)

= Dictyophara europaea =

Species of true bug

Dictyophara europaea, is the type species of planthoppers belonging to the subgenus Dictyophara (Dictyophara): in the family Dictyopharidae, and tribe Dictyopharini.

== Etymology ==
The scientific genus name Dictyophara derives from the Greek (dictyon: net and phorein: wear) and can be translated "who wears a net". The common name European lantern fly is actually derived from a species (Fulgora laternaria) belonging to another family (Fulgoridae).

== Subspecies ==
- Dictyophara europaea rosea Costa, 1862

== Distribution ==
This species can be found in most of Europe, in North Africa and in the eastern Palearctic realm (Afghanistan, Albania, Austria, Belgium, Bulgaria, Denmark, France, Germany, Greece, Hungary, Iran, Italy, Kazakhstan, Kyrgyzstan, Moldova, Montenegro, Poland, Portugal, Romania, Serbia, Spain, Sweden, Switzerland, Tunisia, Turkey, Ukraine and Xinjiang).

== Habitat ==
These insects occurs in dry grasslands and warm open areas.

== Description ==
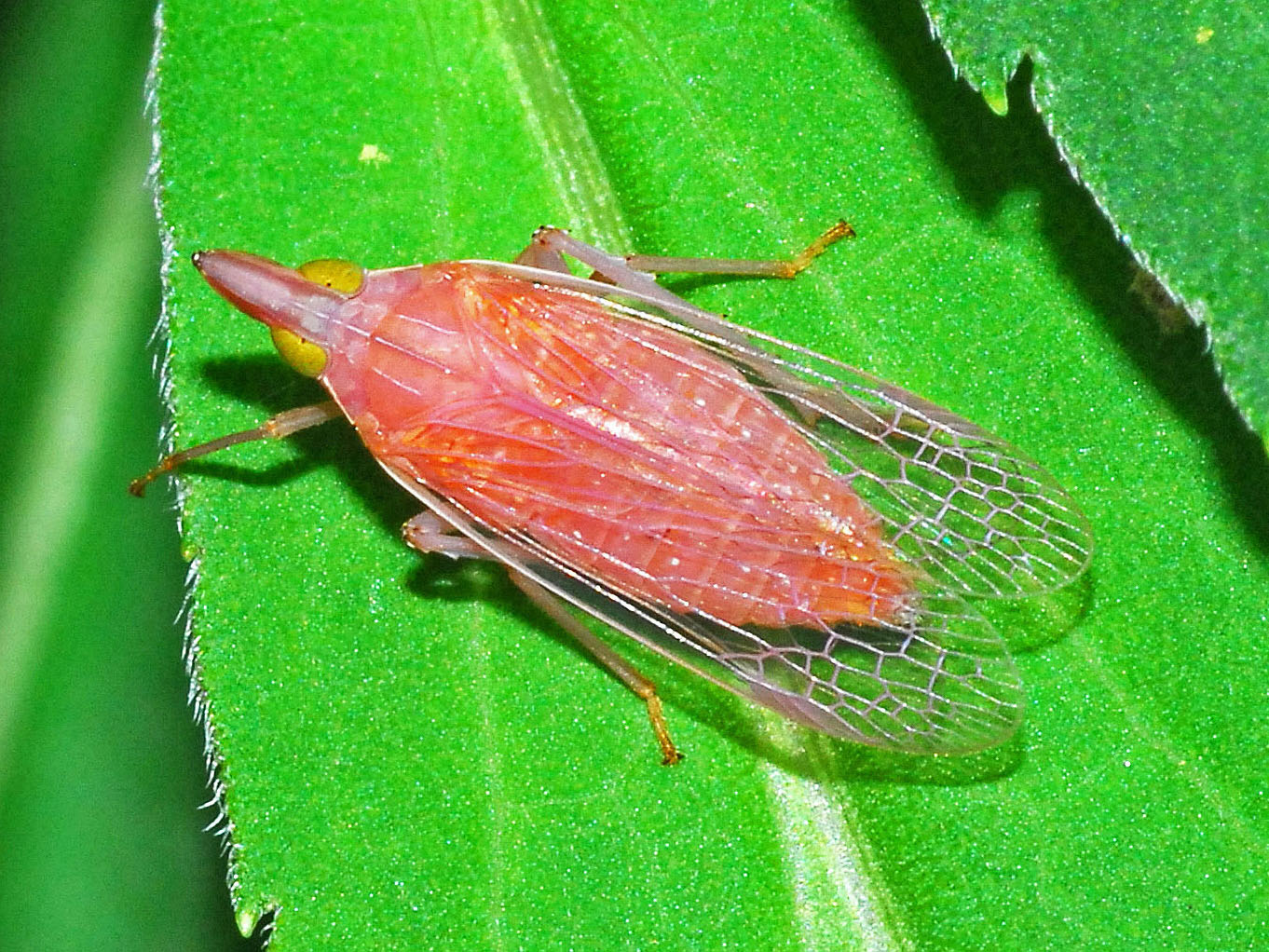
Dictyophara europaea var. rosea

Dictyophara europaea can reach a body length of about 9–13 mm (0.35–0.51 in). These planthoppers have an ovoidal light green body and a conical head extended forward with two strong longitudinal keels and a middle keel converging to the tip. Also the pronotum shows a middle keel and two lateral keels. The forewings are about the same size as the hind wings. Wings are transparent (hyaline) with rich green veining. The distal part of the fore wings has a network formed by the veins. The larvae are similar to the imago in color, shape and head shape. The rarer subspecies Dictyophara europaea rosea shows a pinkish body.

== Biology ==
Adults can be found from June to October. These insects live among herbaceous plants feeding on sap. The eggs are deposited by the female in the soil and thereby individually covered with earth by special structures of the ovipositor. These planthoppers can communicate with conspecifics by vibration signals.

This species is univoltine and polyphagous. The main recorded host plants belong to the family of Asteraceae (Achillea millefolium, Crepis foetida, Sonchus asper), Poaceae (Agropyron repens, Setaria viridis), Amaranthaceae (Amaranthus retroflexus), Ranunculaceae (Clematis vitalba) and Plantaginaceae (Linaria vulgaris).
