= Lophyraspis =

Scientific classification
- Domain: Eukaryota
- Kingdom: Animalia
- Phylum: Arthropoda
- Class: Insecta
- Order: Hemiptera
- Suborder: Auchenorrhyncha
- Family: Aetalionidae
- Genus: Lophyraspis; Stål, 1869

Synonyms
- Gerridius Fowler, 1896

Genus of insects

Lophyraspis is a genus of treehoppers in the family Aetalionidae. It contains 5 species.

== Species ==
- Lophyraspis diminuta Sakakibara & Creão-Duarte, 2004
- Lophyraspis fenestrata Sakakibara & Creão-Duarte, 2004
- Lophyraspis muscaria (Fabricius, 1803)
- Lophyraspis scutellata (Fabricius, 1803)
- Lophyraspis spinosa (Funkhouser, 1930)
