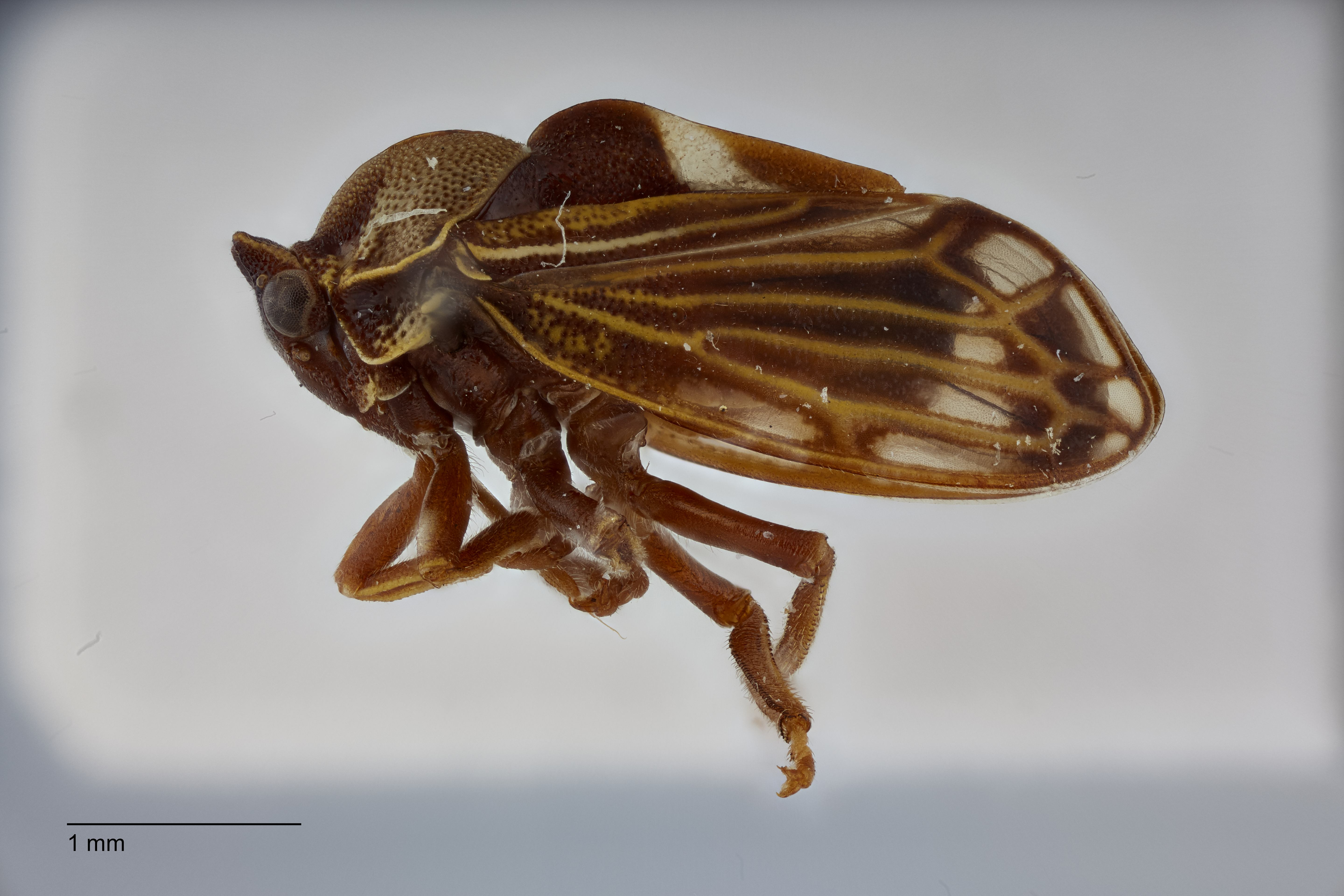
- Tropidaspis carinata

Scientific classification
- Domain: Eukaryota
- Kingdom: Animalia
- Phylum: Arthropoda
- Class: Insecta
- Order: Hemiptera
- Suborder: Auchenorrhyncha
- Family: Aetalionidae
- Genus: Tropidaspis; Stål, 1869

= Tropidaspis =

Genus of insects

Tropidaspis is a genus of treehopper belonging to the family Aetalionidae. It is found in South and Central America. It has 7 described species.

== Species ==
GBIF lists the following species:

- Tropidaspis affinis Fowler, 1897
- Tropidaspis carinata Fabricius, 1803
- Tropidaspis cornuta Haviland, 1925
- Tropidaspis jubata Goding, 1926
- Tropidaspis minor Haviland, 1925
- Tropidaspis similis Schmidt, 1927
- Tropidaspis truncaticornis Goding, 1927
