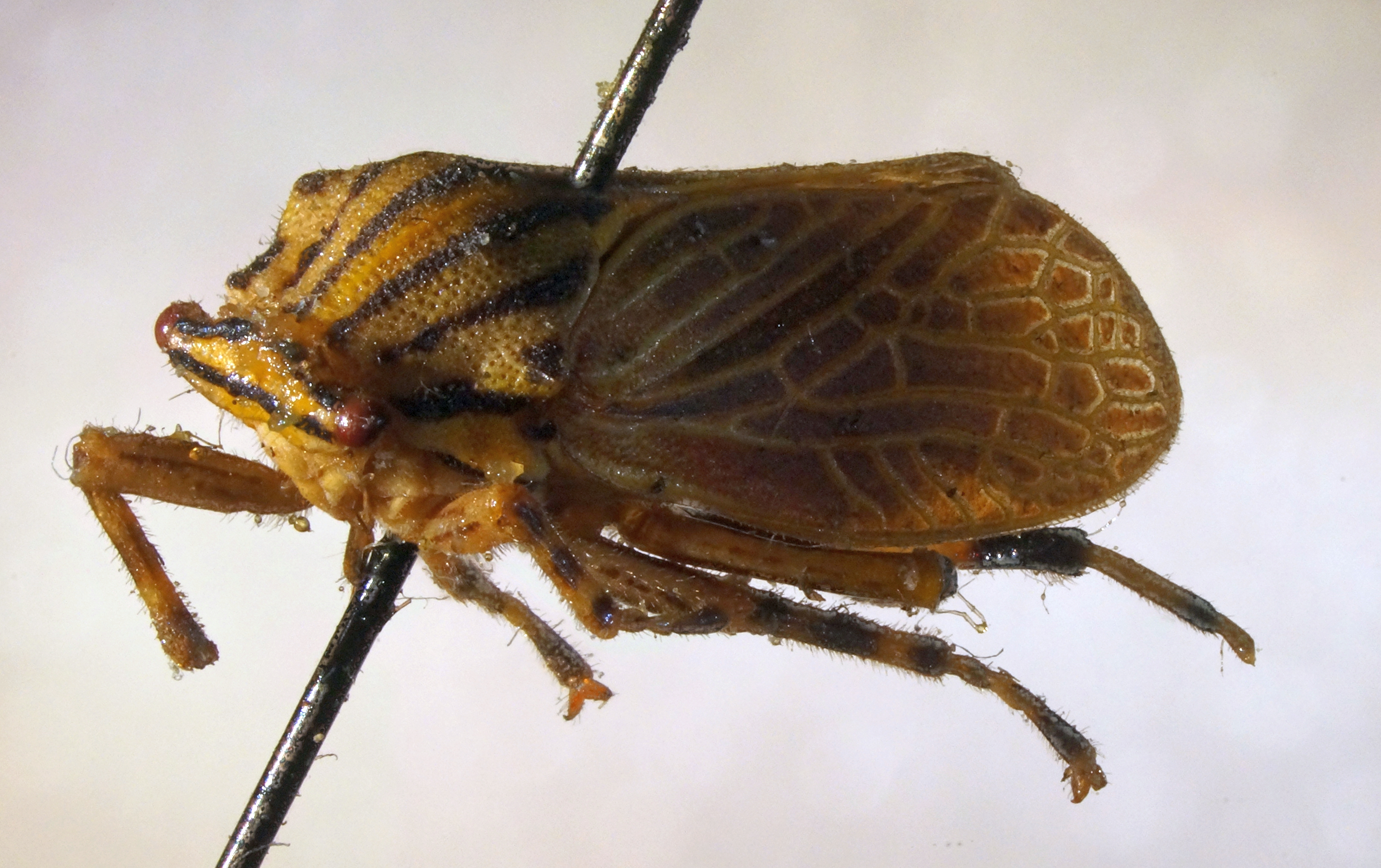
- Aetalion vitticolle

Scientific classification
- Domain: Eukaryota
- Kingdom: Animalia
- Phylum: Arthropoda
- Class: Insecta
- Order: Hemiptera
- Suborder: Auchenorrhyncha
- Family: Aetalionidae
- Genus: Aetalion; Latreille, 1810

= Aetalion =

Genus of insects

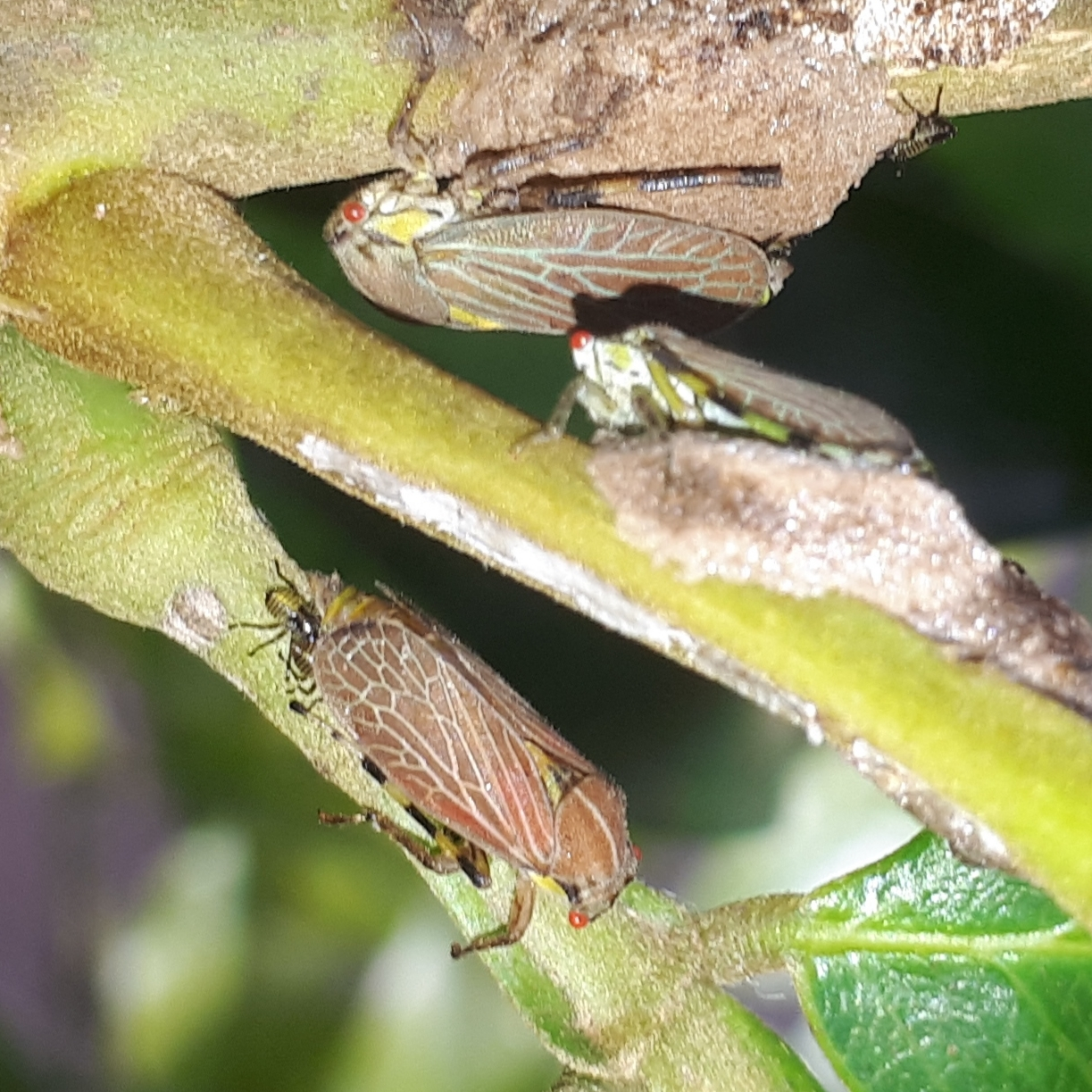
Aetalion reticulatum

Aetalion is a genus of treehopper in the family Aetalionidae. It has 25 described species.

== Species ==
GBIF lists the following:

- Aetalion apicale Walker, 1851
- Aetalion basale Walker, 1851
- Aetalion brunovenosum Yuan, 1990
- Aetalion fissum Walker, 1851
- Aetalion flavescens Yuan, 1990
- Aetalion gratum Walker, 1858
- Aetalion latreillei Signoret, 1851
- Aetalion multicolor Signoret, 1851
- Aetalion nervosopunctatum Signoret, 1851
- Aetalion nigrofacum Yuan, 1990
- Aetalion nigromarginatum Yuan, 1990
- Aetalion nigrum Signoret, 1851
- Aetalion oligocaenicum Statz, 1950
- Aetalion parviceps Signoret, 1851
- Aetalion parvum Dmitriev, 2020
- Aetalion pauciareolum Yuan, 1990
- Aetalion pictum Goding, 1926
- Aetalion pulchrum Walker, 1851
- Aetalion punctatum Walker, 1851
- Aetalion quadratum Fowler, 1897
- Aetalion rarobasale Yuan, 1990
- Aetalion reticulatum Linnaeus, 1758
- Aetalion servillei Laporte, 1832
- Aetalion variabile Stảl, 1869
- Aetalion vitticolle Stal, 1869
