= Qiyangiricaniidae =

Scientific classification
- Kingdom: Animalia
- Phylum: Arthropoda
- Class: Insecta
- Order: Hemiptera
- Suborder: Auchenorrhyncha
- Infraorder: Fulgoromorpha
- Superfamily: Fulgoroidea
- Family: †Qiyangiricaniidae; Szwedo et al., 2011

Extinct family of insects

Qiyangiricaniidae is an extinct insect family of planthoppers. It was first named by Jacek Szwedo, Bo Wang, and Haichun Zhang in 2011 and contains only one genus, Qiyangiricania.

== History ==
The species lived during the Lower Jurassic period. It seems to have died out later on, but this can not be known since few remains have been found.

== Distribution ==
The species lived in southern China.
