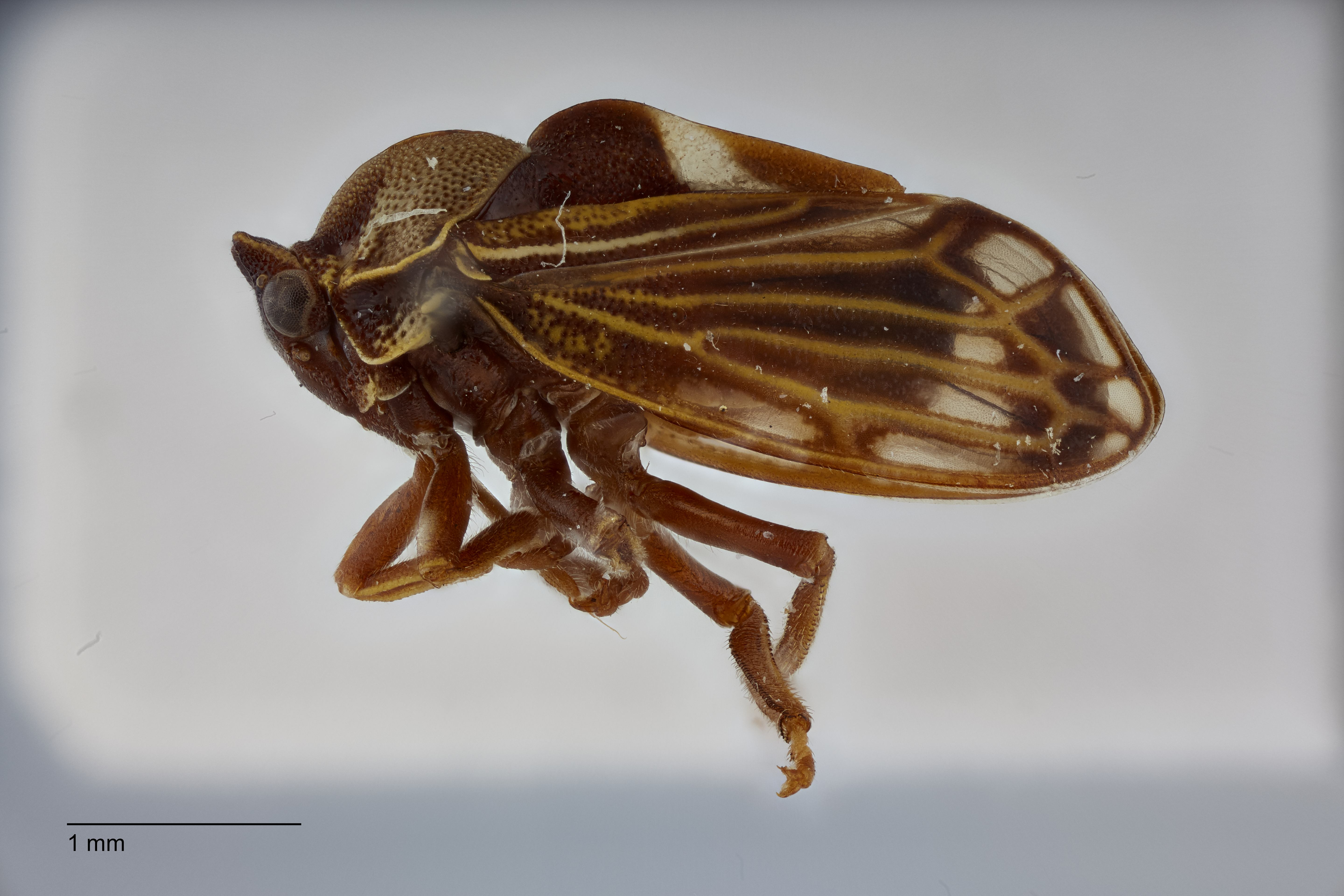
- Tropidaspis carinata

Scientific classification
- Kingdom: Animalia
- Phylum: Arthropoda
- Clade: Pancrustacea
- Class: Insecta
- Order: Hemiptera
- Suborder: Auchenorrhyncha
- Superfamily: Membracoidea
- Family: Aetalionidae; Spinola, 1850

Subfamilies
- Aetalioninae Spinola, 1850; Tribe Aetalionini Spinola, 1850; Aetalion Latreille, 1810; Tribe Darthulini Metcalf, 1939; Darthula Kirkaldy, 1900; Biturritiinae Metcalf, 1929; Biturritia Goding, 1930; Lophyraspis Stal, 1869; Mina Walker, 1858; Tropidaspis Stal, 1869

= Aetalionidae =

Aetalionidae Temporal range: Oligocene–Recent

Family of true bugs

Aetalionidae are a family of treehoppers in the superfamily Membracoidea. Aetalionidae are somewhat like Membracidae in that they have one to three rows of short spines on the hind tibia but differ in having the front femur fused to the trochanter and the scutellum is completely exposed. The females have finger-like protrusions on the genital capsule. The family is mostly Neotropical. The subfamily Biturritiinae is Neotropical while the subfamily Aetalioninae has a Neotropical genus Aetalion and the sole Old World representative genus Darthula with a single species Darthula hardwickii (which is eaten in parts of China and India).

- Membracoidea
  - - - - Aetalionidae
        - Membracidae
      - Cicadellidae
    - Melizoderidae
  - Myerslopiidae

Family relations within the Membracoidea

They form aggregations on the branches of trees where they produce honeydew and are associated with ants and stingless bees. Aetalionid treehoppers are also known for their maternal care with females standing guard over their eggs.

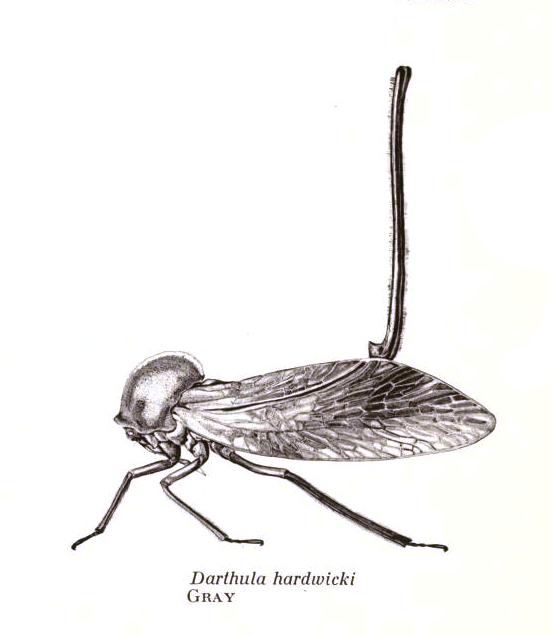
Darthula hardwickii with tail raised

When disturbed, species like Darthula hardwickii are known to raise their tails in a threatening posture.
