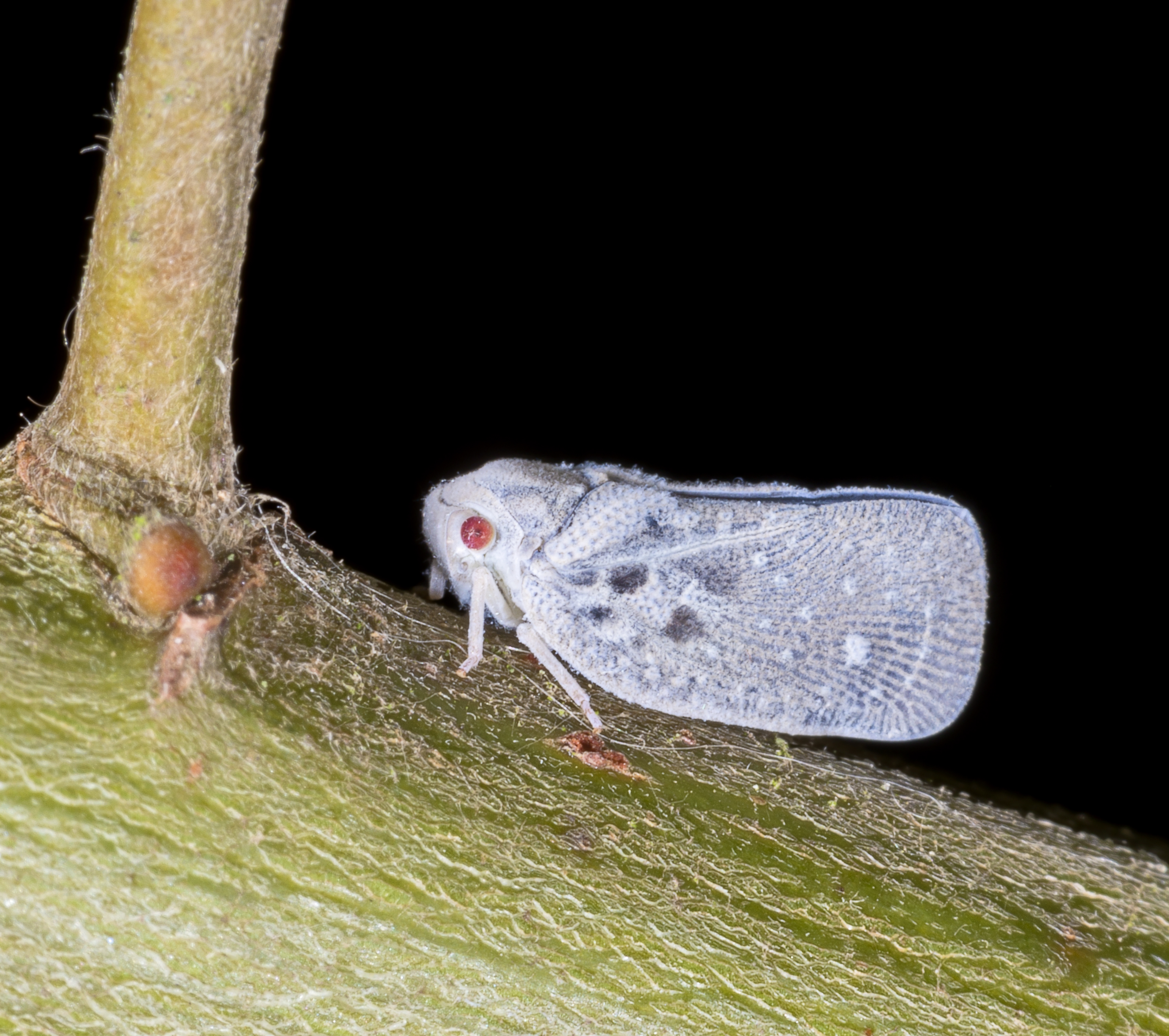
- Adult of Metcalfa pruinosa

Scientific classification
- Kingdom: Animalia
- Phylum: Arthropoda
- Clade: Pancrustacea
- Class: Insecta
- Order: Hemiptera
- Suborder: Auchenorrhyncha
- Infraorder: Fulgoromorpha
- Family: Flatidae
- Genus: Metcalfa
- Species: M. pruinosa

Binomial name
- Metcalfa pruinosa (Say, 1830)

Synonyms
- Ormenis pruinosa (Say, 1830) Glover, 1877; Poeciloptera prumosa (Say, 1830) Dohrn, 1859; Poeciloptera pruinosa (Say, 1830) Schaum, 1850; Melormenis pruinosa (Say, 1830); Flata pruinosa Say, 1830

= Metcalfa pruinosa =

Citrus flatid planthopper

Species of planthopper

Metcalfa pruinosa, the citrus flatid planthopper, is a species of insect in the Flatidae family of planthoppers first described by Thomas Say in 1830.

== Subspecies ==
- Metcalfa pruinosa cubana (Metcalf & Bruner, 1948)

== Distribution ==
The species is native to North America (Nearctic realm), but it is today found throughout Europe (Austria, Britain, France, Spain, Italy, Hungary, Romania, Slovenia, Poland, Switzerland, and Moldova), in the Neotropical realm and in South Korea.

== Description ==
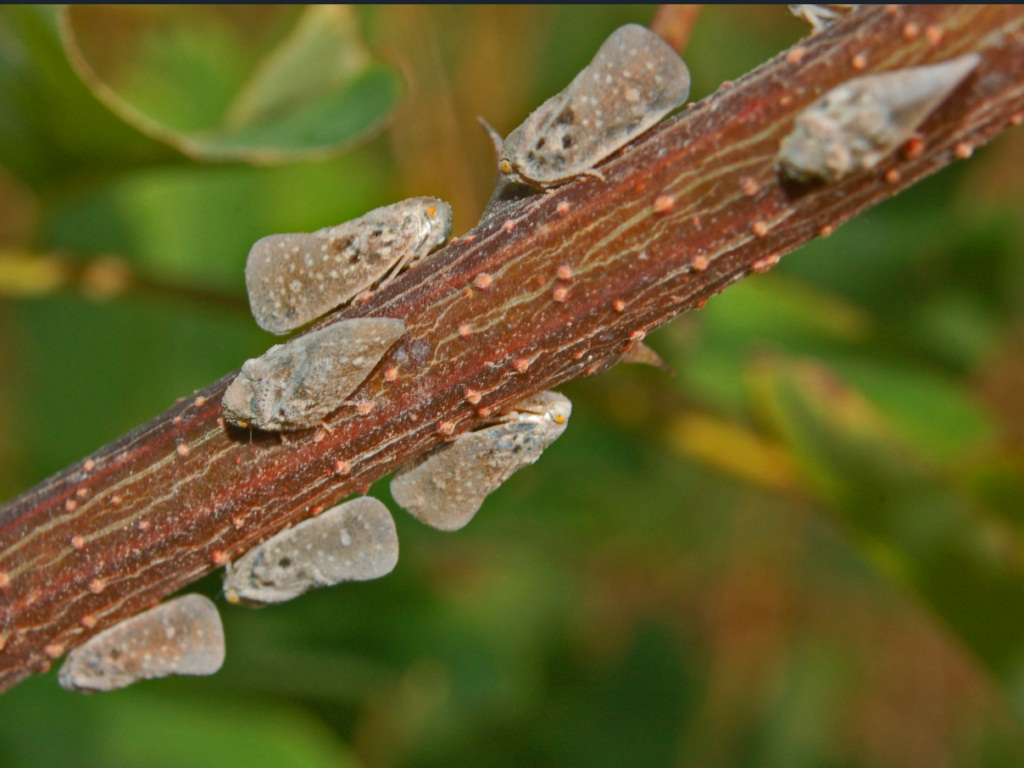
Adult citrus flatid planthoppers

Adults of Metcalfa pruinosa can reach a length of 5.5–8 millimetres (7/32–5/16 in) and a width of 2–3 millimetres (5/64–1/8 in) at the widest point. They are initially whitish. The color of adults may vary from brown to gray, in connection with the presence of a bluish white epicuticular wax, covering especially the nymphs. The large and prominent compound eyes are yellow. The mouthparts are adapted for piercing and sucking. The trapezoidal forewings are held vertically, wrapping the body when the insect is at rest. The front wings have veined costal cell and several characteristic whitish spots. The hind tibiae usually have two lateral spines in addition to the other spines at the apex.

Nymphs may reach a length of about 3.2 millimetres (1/8 in). Color varies from whitish to light green, with relative large tufts of white wax on the abdomen.

Citrus flatid planthopper nymph

== Behavior and ecological impact ==
The species is univoltine, producing one generation per year. Adults mate in fall during the night. The females lay about 100 eggs, usually in the bark of host plants. Eggs overwinter, hatching the following spring. The adults are seen mainly in summer and fall, when they feed gregariously on sap. When they feed on sap, they eject excess sugar in the form of honeydew. This attracts bees, which convert it to honey.

As it feeds, it causes serious damage to field crops and ornamental plants. It is polyphagous, feeding on a variety of plant taxa. Host plants include maples, dogwoods, hawthorns, willows, elms, privet, black locust, and elder. It lives on crop plants such as grape, citrus, apricot, peach, blackberry, and raspberry.

== Gallery ==
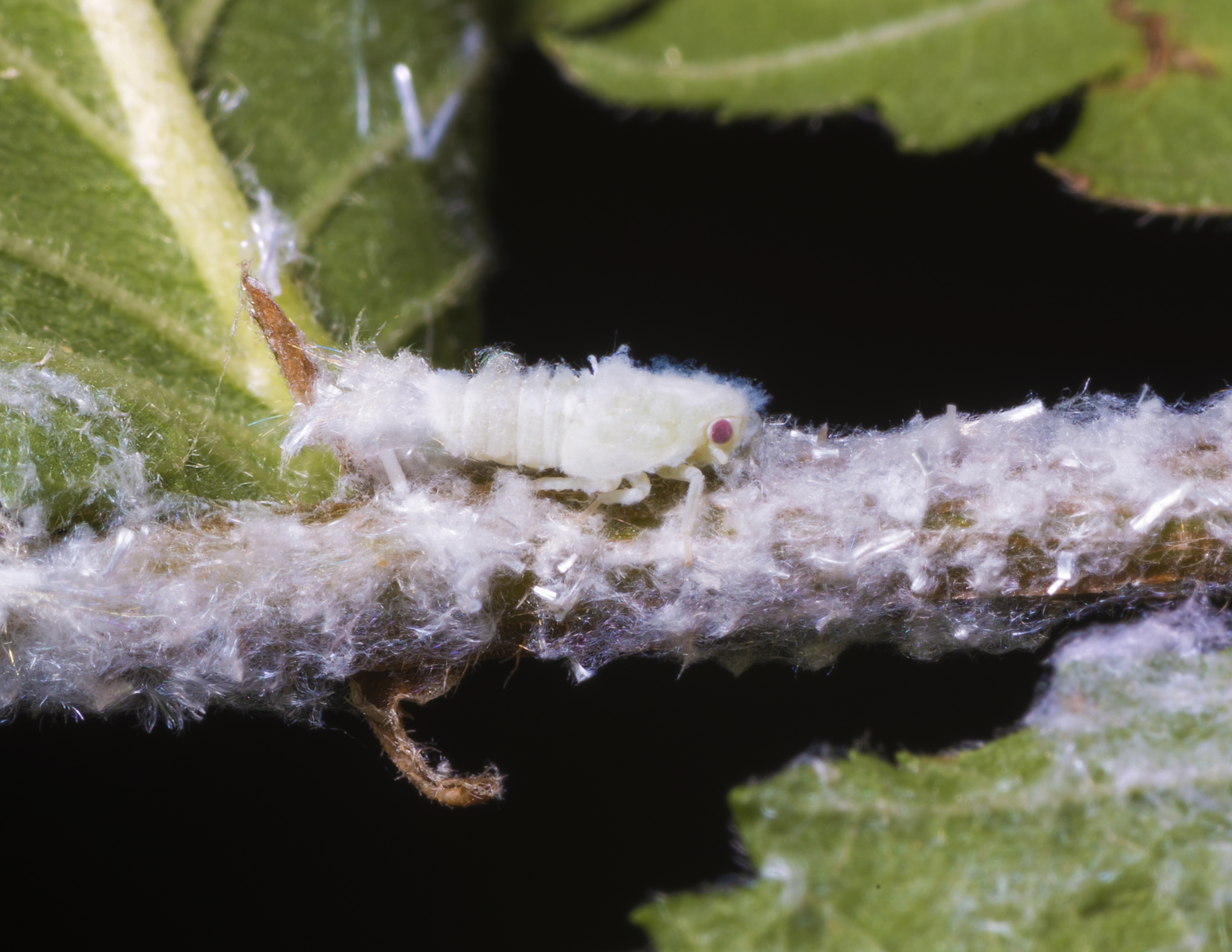
Citrus flatid planthopper larva

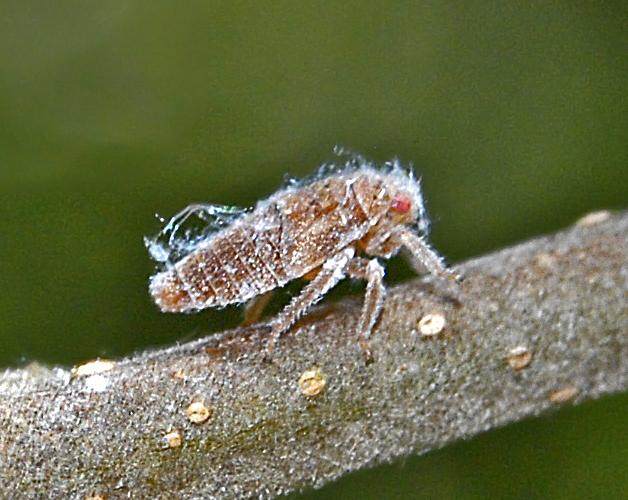
Nymph

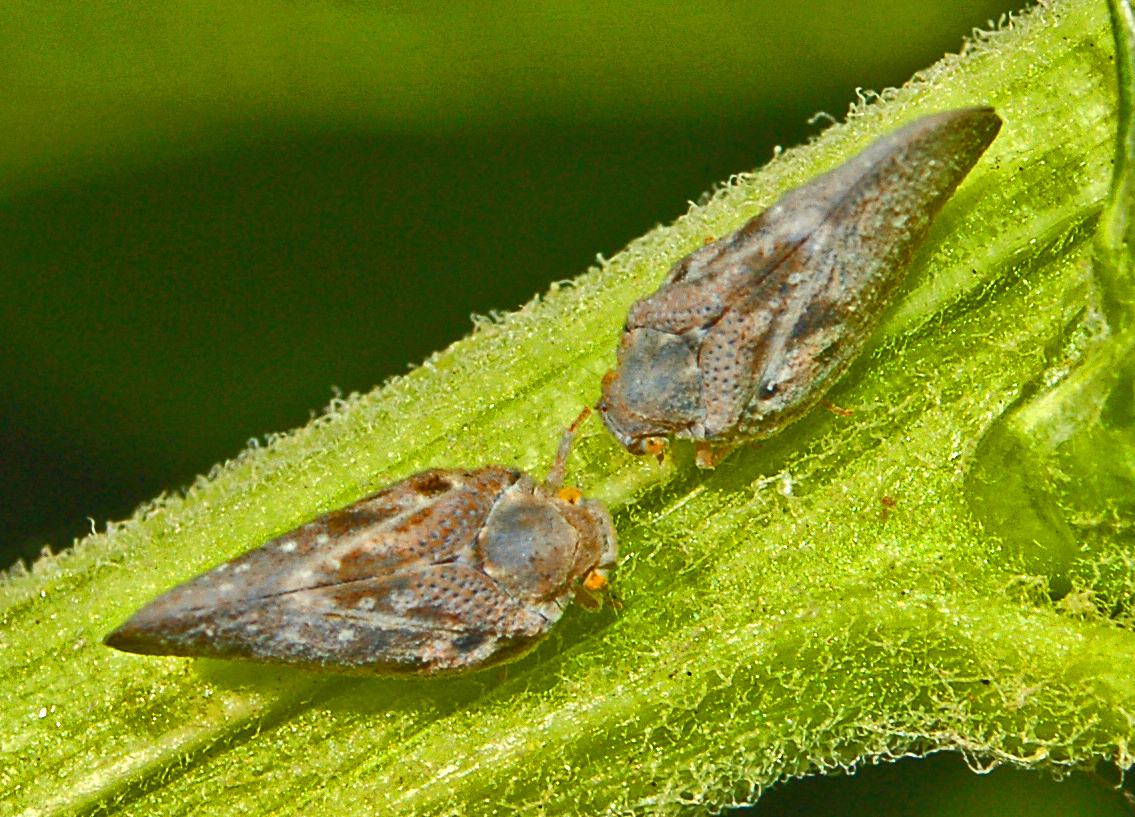
Adults, dorsal view

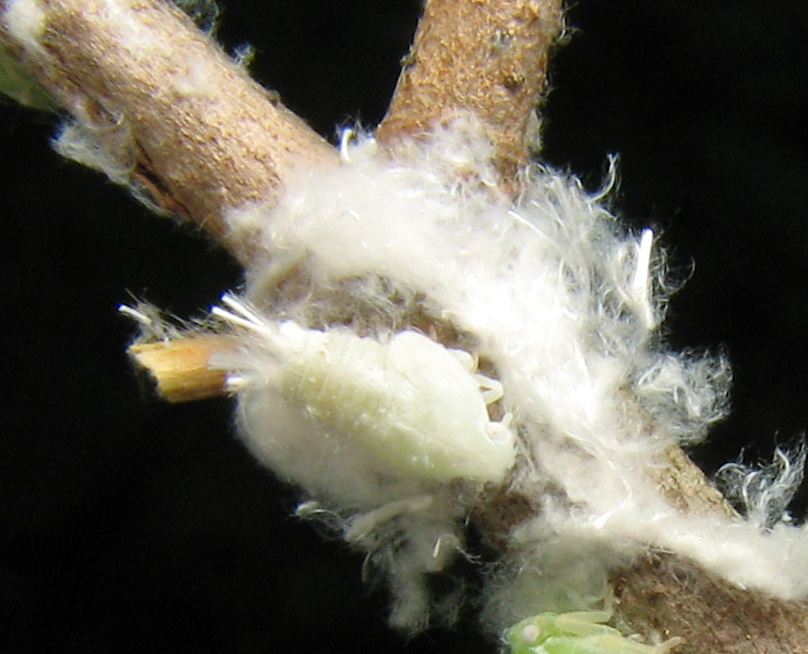
Nymph

== Bibliography ==
- Glover T. (1877) Homoptera in Report of the Entomologist and Curator of the Museum, Report of the United States Commissioner of Agriculture. Washington, D. C., 1876: 17–46
- Metcalf Z.P. (1957) Part 13. Flatidae and Hypochthonellidae, In: Metcalf Z. P. 1954 – General Catalogue of the Homoptera. Fascicule IV, North Carolina State College, Raleigh(United States of America). p. 1–565.
- Pavel Lauterer (2002) Citrus Flatid Planthopper – Metcalfa pruinosa (Hemiptera: Flatidae), a New Pest of Ornamental Horticulture in the Czech Republic. In: Plant Protection Science. Vol. 38, No. 4, 2002, S. 145–148
- Say T. (1830) Descriptions of new North American Hemipterous insects, belonging to the first family of the section Homoptera of Latreille, Journal of the Academy of Natural Sciences of Philadelphia, 6: 235–244.
- Schaum H.R. (1850) Fulgorellae. Erster Section A-G. In: Ersch I. S. & Gruber I. G. 1850 Allgemeine Encyklopädie der Wissenschaften und Kunste in alnhaberischen folge von Genannten Schriftstellern bearbeitet und herausgegeben, 51. p. 58–73.
