= Hypochthonella =

Scientific classification
- Domain: Eukaryota
- Kingdom: Animalia
- Phylum: Arthropoda
- Class: Insecta
- Order: Hemiptera
- Suborder: Auchenorrhyncha
- Infraorder: Fulgoromorpha
- Family: Hypochthonellidae; China & Fennah, 1952
- Genus: Hypochthonella; China & Fennah, 1952
- Species: H. caeca

Binomial name
- Hypochthonella caeca China & Fennah, 1952

Genus of true bugs

Hypochthonella is a monotypic genus of Fulgoromorpha (planthoppers), with the single species, Hypochthonella caeca discovered from Zimbabwe. This species is the only known representative of the monotypic family Hypochthonellidae China & Fennah, 1952.
