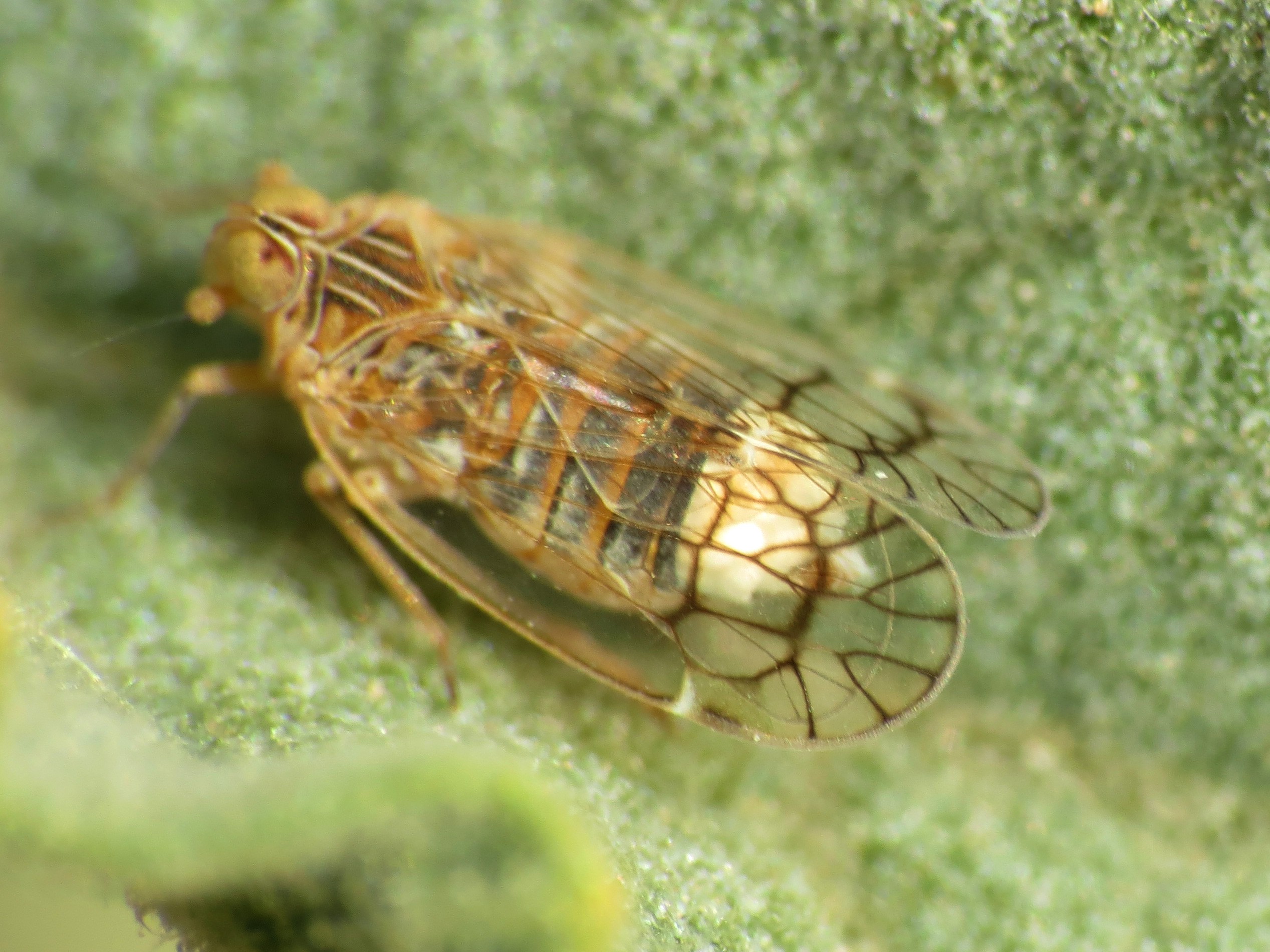
- Oeclidius sp., Arizona, USA

Scientific classification
- Kingdom: Animalia
- Phylum: Arthropoda
- Clade: Pancrustacea
- Class: Insecta
- Order: Hemiptera
- Suborder: Auchenorrhyncha
- Infraorder: Fulgoromorpha
- Superfamily: Fulgoroidea
- Family: Kinnaridae; Muir, 1925

Subfamilies
- Kinnarinae; Prosotropinae

= Kinnaridae =

Family of true bugs

Kinnaridae is a family of fulgoroid planthoppers. This is a small family with a little more than 20 genera and about 100 species. The family was erected by Muir in 1925 and most members are found in the Oriental and Neotropical regions and only a few in the Nearctic and Palaearctic regions.

Family members are identified by a combination of characters. Adults have a small head that is narrower than the thorax with the vertex narrow and about as long as it is wide. The frons is longer than wide and lacks a median keel but has two lateral carinae. Three simple eyes are usually present. The antenna is small with a globose pedicel. The sucking mouthparts which form the rostrum or beak reaches between the hind femur or the tip of the abdomen and has a long segment at the tip. The pronotum is short and wider than the head. The wings have transparent membranes and the forewings long and parallel sided. The venation consists of claval veins that join near the apex without any granulation (more accurately termed as sensory pits, a character that is used to separate them from the closely related Meenoplidae). The hind tibia do not have any lateral spines.

== Genera ==
These 25 genera belong to the family Kinnaridae:

- Adolenda Distant, 1911^{c g}
- Apocathema^{c g}
- Atopocixius Muir, 1926^{c g}
- Bashgultala Dlabola, 1957^{c g}
- Dineparmene Fennah, 1945^{c g}
- Entithena^{c g}
- Eparmene Fowler, 1904^{c g}
- Eparmenoides Fennah, 1945^{c g}
- Kinnacana Remane, 1985^{c g}
- Kinnapotiguara Xing, Hoch & Chen, 2013^{c g}
- Kinnara Distant, 1906^{c g}
- Kinnoccia Remane, 1985^{c g}
- Lomagenes Fennah, 1945^{c g}
- Luiuia^{c g}
- Micrixia Fowler, 1904^{c g}
- Microissus Fennah, 1947^{c g}
- Nesomicrixia Emeljanov, 1984^{c g}
- Oeclidius Van Duzee, 1914^{c g b}
- Oreopenes Ramos, 1957^{c g}
- Paramicrixia Distant, 1911^{c g}
- Perloma Emelyanov, 1984^{c g}
- Prosotropis Uhler, 1895^{c g}
- Quilessa Fennah, 1942^{c g}
- Southia Kirkaldy, 1904^{c g}
- Valenciolenda Hoch & Sendra, 2021^{c g}

Data sources: i = ITIS, c = Catalogue of Life, g = GBIF, b = Bugguide.net
