= Gengidae =

Scientific classification
- Domain: Eukaryota
- Kingdom: Animalia
- Phylum: Arthropoda
- Class: Insecta
- Order: Hemiptera
- Suborder: Auchenorrhyncha
- Infraorder: Fulgoromorpha
- Family: Gengidae; Fennah, 1949

Family of true bugs

The Gengidae are a family of Fulgoromorpha (planthoppers), with species found in South Africa.

== Genera and species ==
Fulgoromorpha Lists On the Web includes four species in two genera:

- Acrometopum Stål, 1853
  - Acrometopum costatipenne Stål, 1855 - type species
  - Acrometopum panoblites (Fennah, 1949)
  - Acrometopum theroni Emeljanov, 2007
- Microeurybrachys Muir, 1931 - monotypic
  - Microeurybrachys vitrifrons Muir, 1931
