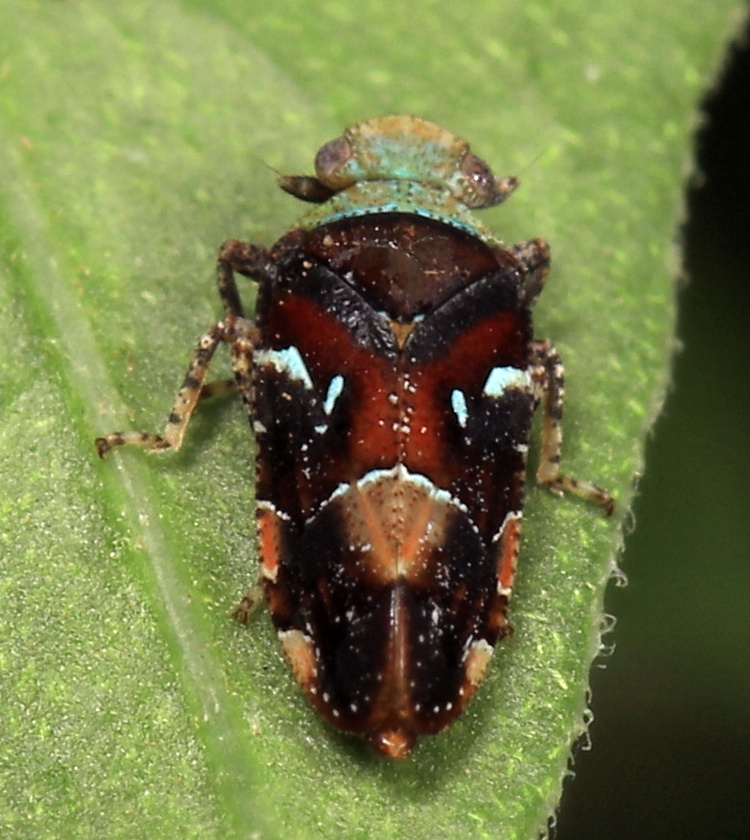
- Nototettigometra patruelis from South Africa

Scientific classification
- Domain: Eukaryota
- Kingdom: Animalia
- Phylum: Arthropoda
- Class: Insecta
- Order: Hemiptera
- Suborder: Auchenorrhyncha
- Infraorder: Fulgoromorpha
- Family: Tettigometridae; Germar, 1821

Synonyms
- Tettigometrae Germar, 1821

= Tettigometridae =

Family of true bugs

The Tettigometridae are a family of Fulgoromorpha (planthoppers), with an Old World species distribution.

== Subfamilies, tribes and genera ==
Fulgoromorpha Lists On the Web includes the following:

=== Egropinae ===
Auth.: Baker, 1924 (West Africa, Indo-China, Malesia)

- tribe Cyranometrini Bourgoin, 1987
  - Cyranometra Bourgoin, 1987
- tribe Egropini Baker, 1924
  - Egropa Melichar, 1903
  - Megaloplastinx Schmidt, 1912

=== Nototettigometrinae ===
Auth.: Bourgoin, 2018

- Apohilda Bourgoin, 1986
- Euphyonarthex Schmidt, 1912
- Hildadina Bourgoin, 1986
- Megahilda Fennah, 1959
- Nototettigometra Muir, 1924
- Raatzbrockmannia Schmidt, 1924

=== Phalixinae ===
Auth.: Ghauri, 1964 (central Africa)

- Phalix Fennah, 1952

=== Tettigometrinae ===
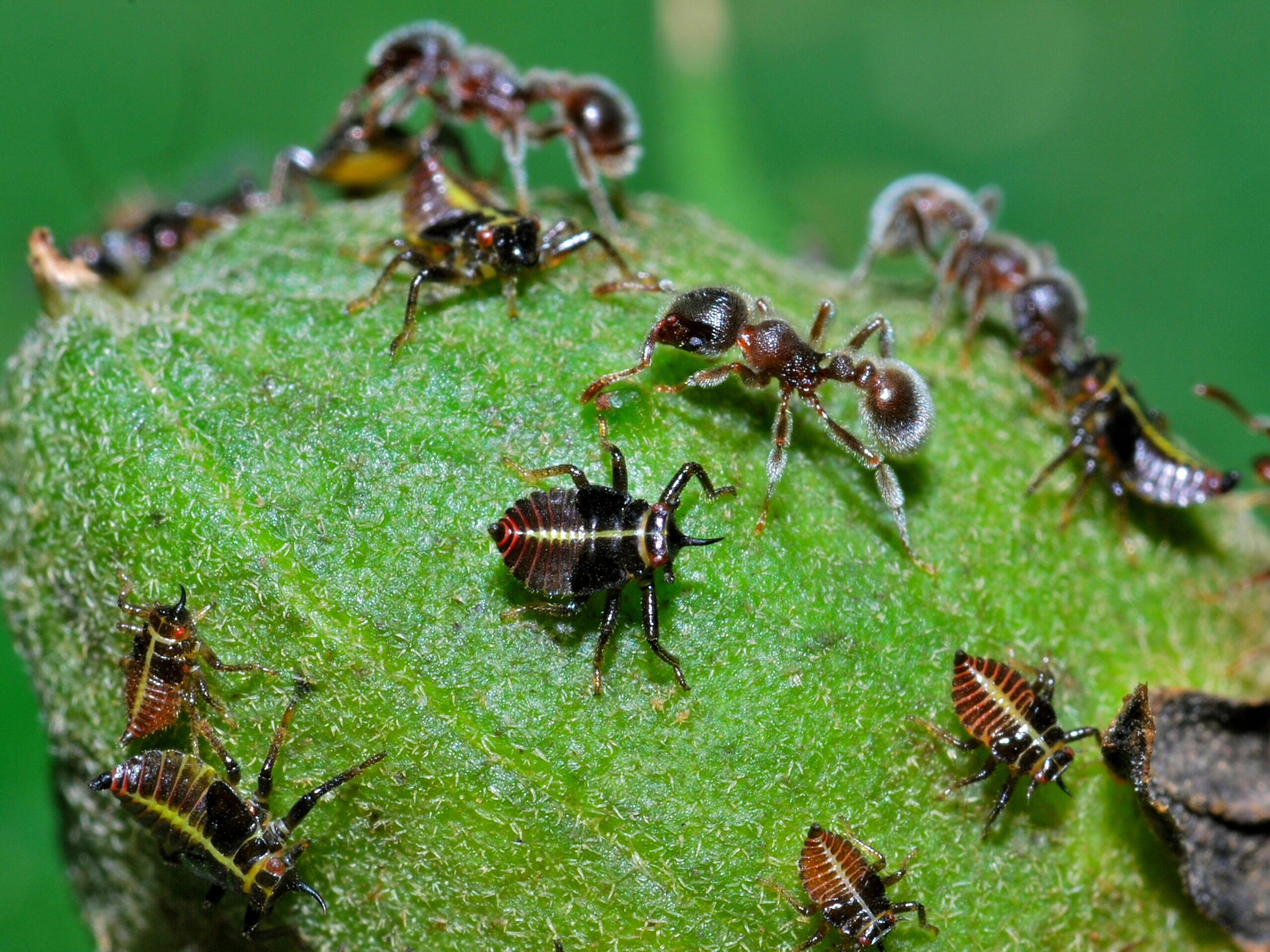
Tettigometrid nymphs tended by ants

Auth.: Germar, 1821

- tribe Plesiometrini Bourgoin, 2018
  - Mesohilda Fennah, 1952
  - Parahilda Knight, 1964
  - Plesiometra Bourgoin, 1986
- tribe Tettigometrini Germar, 1821
  - Tettigometra Latreille, 1804 - type genus
