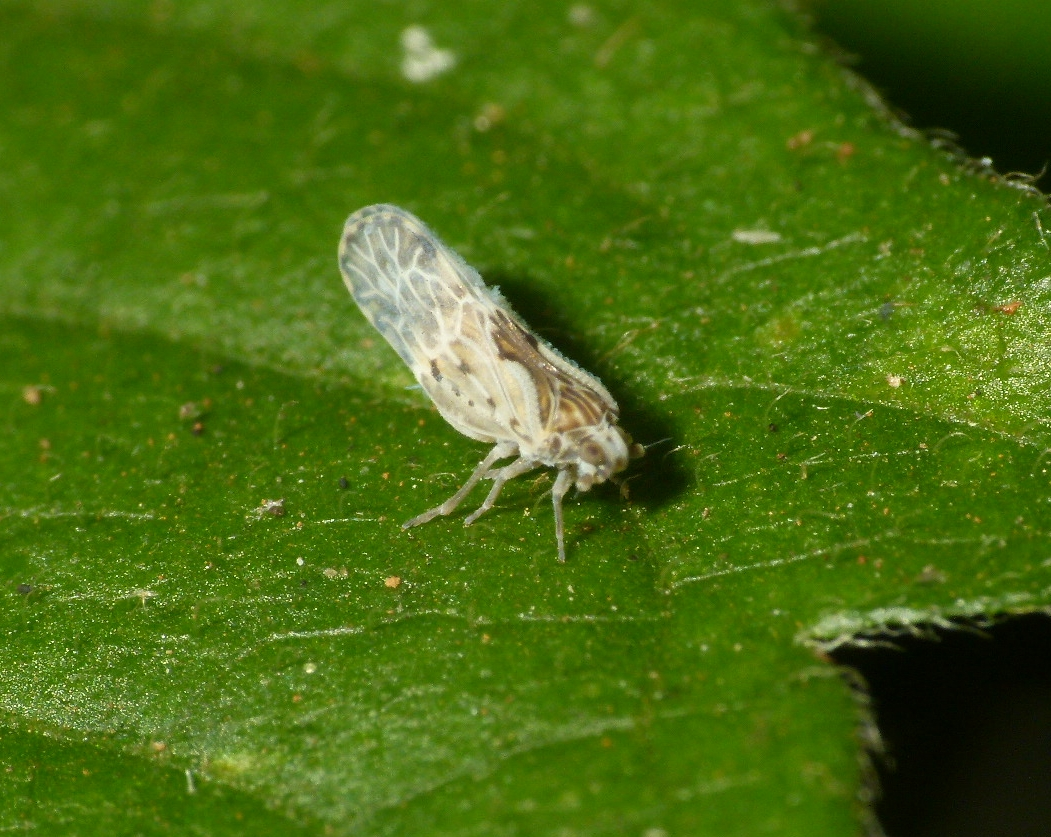
- Kermesia nigropunctata from India

Scientific classification
- Domain: Eukaryota
- Kingdom: Animalia
- Phylum: Arthropoda
- Class: Insecta
- Order: Hemiptera
- Suborder: Auchenorrhyncha
- Infraorder: Fulgoromorpha
- Superfamily: Fulgoroidea
- Family: Meenoplidae; Fieber, 1872

Subfamilies
- Meenoplinae; Kermesiinae (= Nisiinae Kirkaldy 1907)

= Meenoplidae =

Family of true bugs

Meenoplidae is a family of fulgoromorph planthoppers that are closely related to the Kinnaridae. They are small, with tent-like wings and usually are less than a centimetre long and a little more than a 100 species in around 25 genera are known with a distribution restricted to the Old World. They are distinguished by having one or more of their claval veins covered in sensory pits (appearing granular) along their length. The face is usually broad and the lateral carinae (keeled edges) are strongly elevated. The last segment of the labium is elongate. A median ocellus is usually present. The wings are always present in adults and the venation consists of a small number of veins and very few cross veins. There are two subfamilies currently considered valid Meenoplinae and Kermesiinae. About 50 species are known from Africa. Along with the Achilixiidae and Kinnaridae, they have flattened star-shaped plate organs on their antennae. The nymphs are found close to the soil while adults feed mainly on monocots. Species identity can usually be established reliably only by examination of the male genitalia. A few species Phaconeura pluto, Meenoplus cancavus, Tsingya clarkei, and Suva oloimoa are known to be cave dwelling.

== Subfamilies and genera ==
The genera within the family are placed in two subfamilies. In the subfamily Meenoplinae, the claval veins are fused near the middle with the first vein having a row of sensory pits while the second is strongly curved with irregularly arranged sensory pits. In the Kermesiinae, the claval veins fuse near the apex and the first claval vein has two rows of sensory pits with the second being only slightly curved and lacking sensory pits.

Meenoplinae

- Anigrus Stål, 1866
- Distantiana Bourgoin, 1997
- Meenoplus Fieber, 1866
- Metanigrus Tsaur, Yang & Wilson, 1986
- Tsingya Hoch and Bourgoin, 2013

Kermesiinae

- Afronisia Wilson, 1988
- Anorhinosia Bourgoin, 1997
- Caledonisia Bourgoin, 1997
- Eponisia Matsumura, 1914
- Eponisiella Emeljanov, 1984
- Fennahsia Bourgoin, 1997
- Glyptodonisia Bourgoin, 1997
- Insulisia Bonfils & Attié, 1998
- Kermesia Melichar, 1903
- Koghisia Bourgoin, 1997
- Muirsinia Bourgoin, 1997
- Nisamia Emeljanov, 1984
- Nisia Melichar, 1903
- Phaconeura Kirkaldy, 1906
- Robigalia Distant, 1916
- Suva Kirkaldy, 1906
- Suvanisia Bourgoin, 1997
- Tyweponisia Bourgoin, 1997
