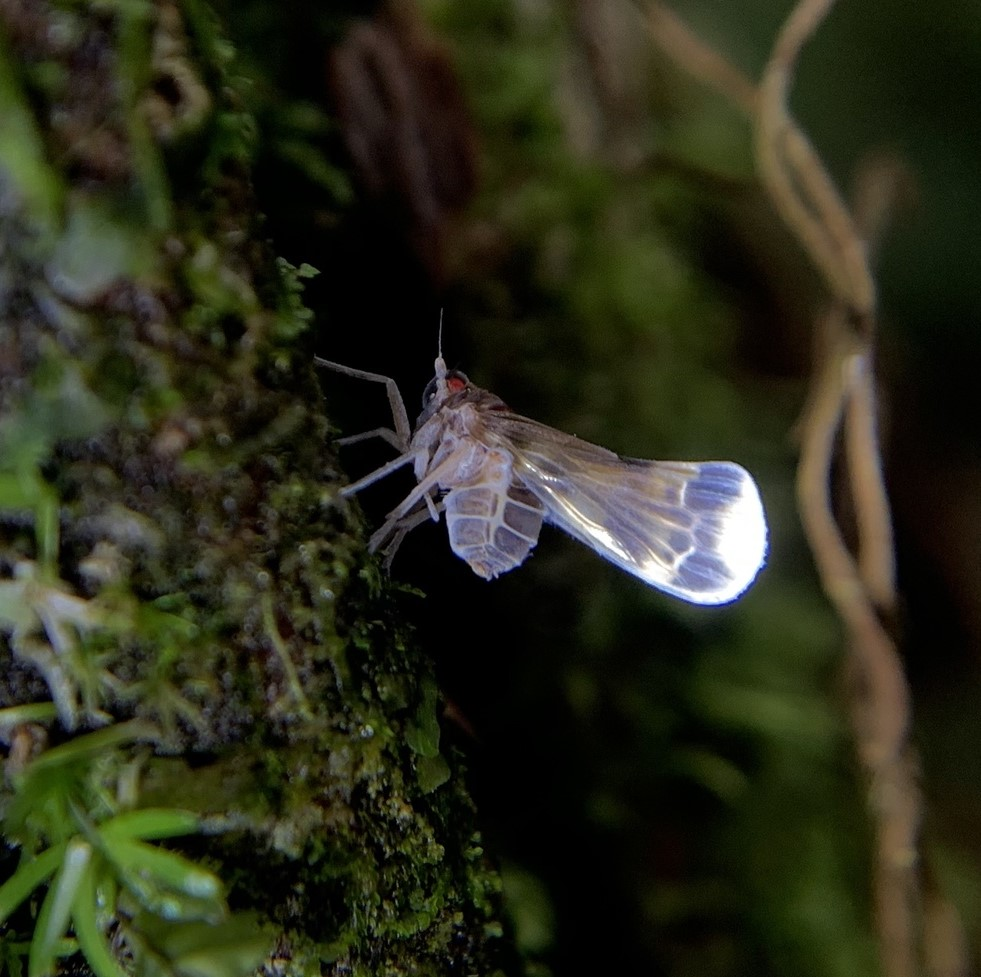
- Bebaiotes banksi

Scientific classification
- Domain: Eukaryota
- Kingdom: Animalia
- Phylum: Arthropoda
- Class: Insecta
- Order: Hemiptera
- Suborder: Auchenorrhyncha
- Infraorder: Fulgoromorpha
- Family: Achilixiidae; Muir, 1923

= Achilixiidae =

Family of true bugs

The Achilixiidae are a family of Fulgoromorpha (planthoppers); species may be found in the neotropical and Asian regions. They are closely related to Achilidae and are sometimes included under Achilidae as a subfamily. Like Achilidae, species generally feed on several species of plant though the nymph stage has been found to feed on fungus. Like other planthoppers, the immature stage is covered in a wax which may help protect it from predators. Achilixiidae are small or medium sized for planthoppers and are greatly compressed, not depressed like the Achilidae.

== Genera and species ==
Two genera, each in its own subfamily, are known:

=== Achilixiinae ===
Auth.: Muir, 1923 - Malesia

- Achilixius Muir, 1923
  - Achilixius bakeri Wilson, 1989
  - Achilixius danaumoati Wilson, 1989
  - Achilixius davaoensi Muir, 1923
  - Achilixius fasciata Wilson, 1989
  - Achilixius fennahi Wilson, 1989
  - Achilixius irigae Wilson, 1989
  - Achilixius kolintangi Wilson, 1989
  - Achilixius mayoyae Wilson, 1989
  - Achilixius minahassae Wilson, 1989
  - Achilixius morowali Wilson, 1989
  - Achilixius muajati Wilson, 1989
  - Achilixius muiri Wilson, 1989
  - Achilixius sandakanensis Muir, 1923
  - Achilixius singularis Muir, 1923 - type species
  - Achilixius torautensis Wilson, 1989
  - Achilixius tubulifer (Melichar, 1914) (synonym Syntames tubulifer Melichar, 1914)

=== Bebaiotinae ===
Auth.: Emeljanov, 1991 - neotropical region

- Bebaiotes Muir, 1924
  - Bebaiotes banksi (Metcalf, 1938) (synonym Muirilixius banksi Metcalf, 1938)
  - Bebaiotes bucayensis Muir, 1924 – type species
  - Bebaiotes dorsivittata Fennah, 1947
  - Bebaiotes guianesus (Fennah, 1947) (synonym Muirilixius guianesus Fennah, 1947)
  - Bebaiotes nigrigaster Muir, 1924
  - Bebaiotes nivosa Fennah, 1947
  - Bebaiotes pallidinervis Muir, 1934
  - Bebaiotes pulla Muir, 1934
