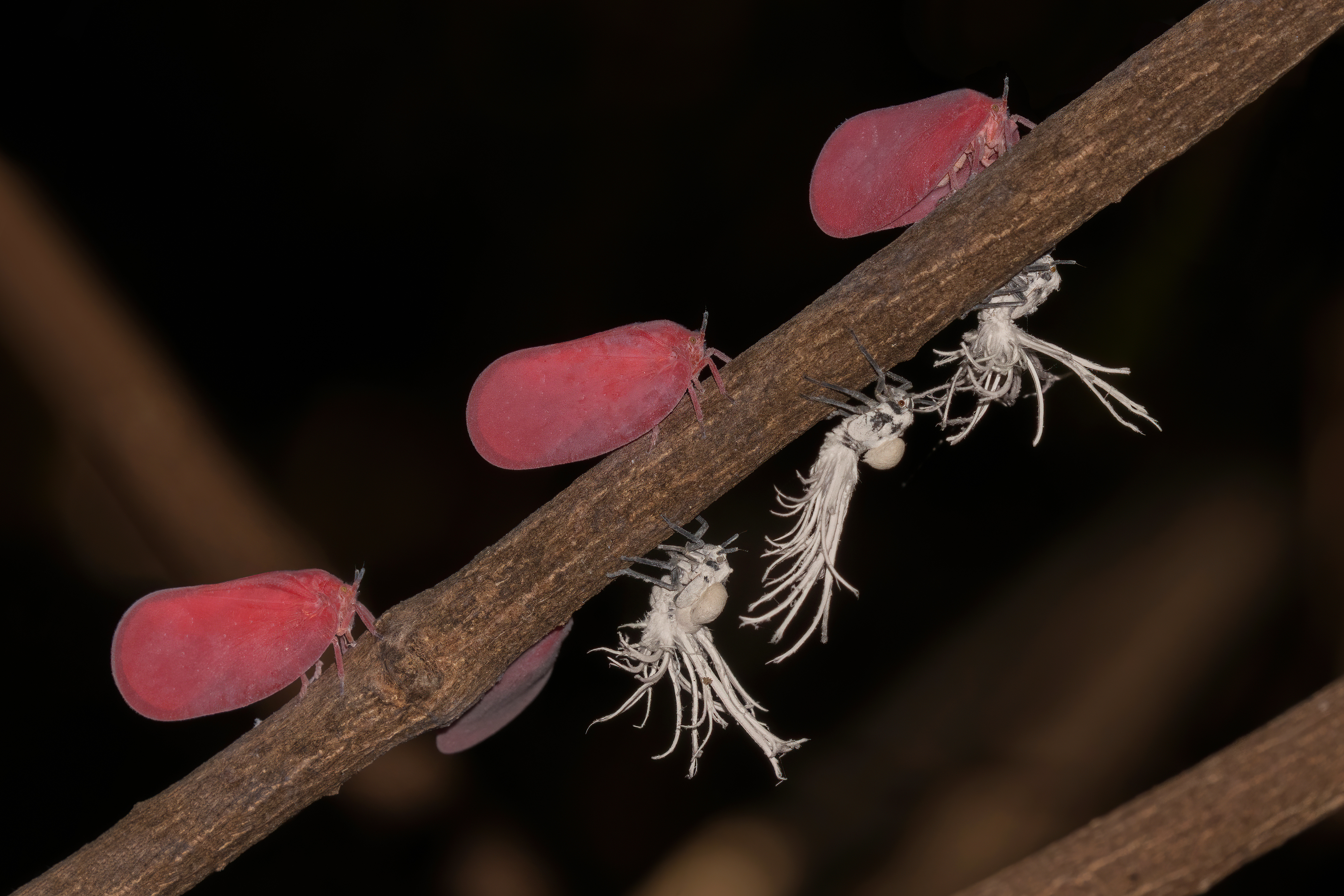
- Flatida rosea (Flatidae) adults and nymphs

Scientific classification
- Kingdom: Animalia
- Phylum: Arthropoda
- Class: Insecta
- Order: Hemiptera
- Suborder: Auchenorrhyncha
- Infraorder: Fulgoromorpha; Evans, 1946

Families
- See text

= Planthopper =

Planthopper Temporal range: Carboniferous–Recent

Superfamily of insects

A planthopper is any insect in the infraorder Fulgoromorpha, in the suborder Auchenorrhyncha, a group exceeding 12,500 described species worldwide. The name comes from their remarkable resemblance to leaves and other plants of their environment and that they often "hop" for quick transportation in a similar way to that of grasshoppers. However, planthoppers generally walk very slowly. Distributed worldwide, all members of this group are plant-feeders, though few are considered pests. Fulgoromorphs are most reliably distinguished from the other Auchenorrhyncha by two features: the bifurcate (Y-shaped) anal vein in the forewing, and the thickened, three-segmented antennae, with a generally round or egg-shaped second segment (pedicel) that bears a fine filamentous arista.

== Overview ==
Planthoppers are laterally flattened and hold their broad wings vertically, in a tent-like fashion, concealing the sides of the body and part of the legs. Nymphs of many planthoppers produce wax from special glands on the abdominal terga and other parts of the body. These are hydrophobic and help conceal the insects. Adult females of many families also produce wax which may be used to protect eggs.

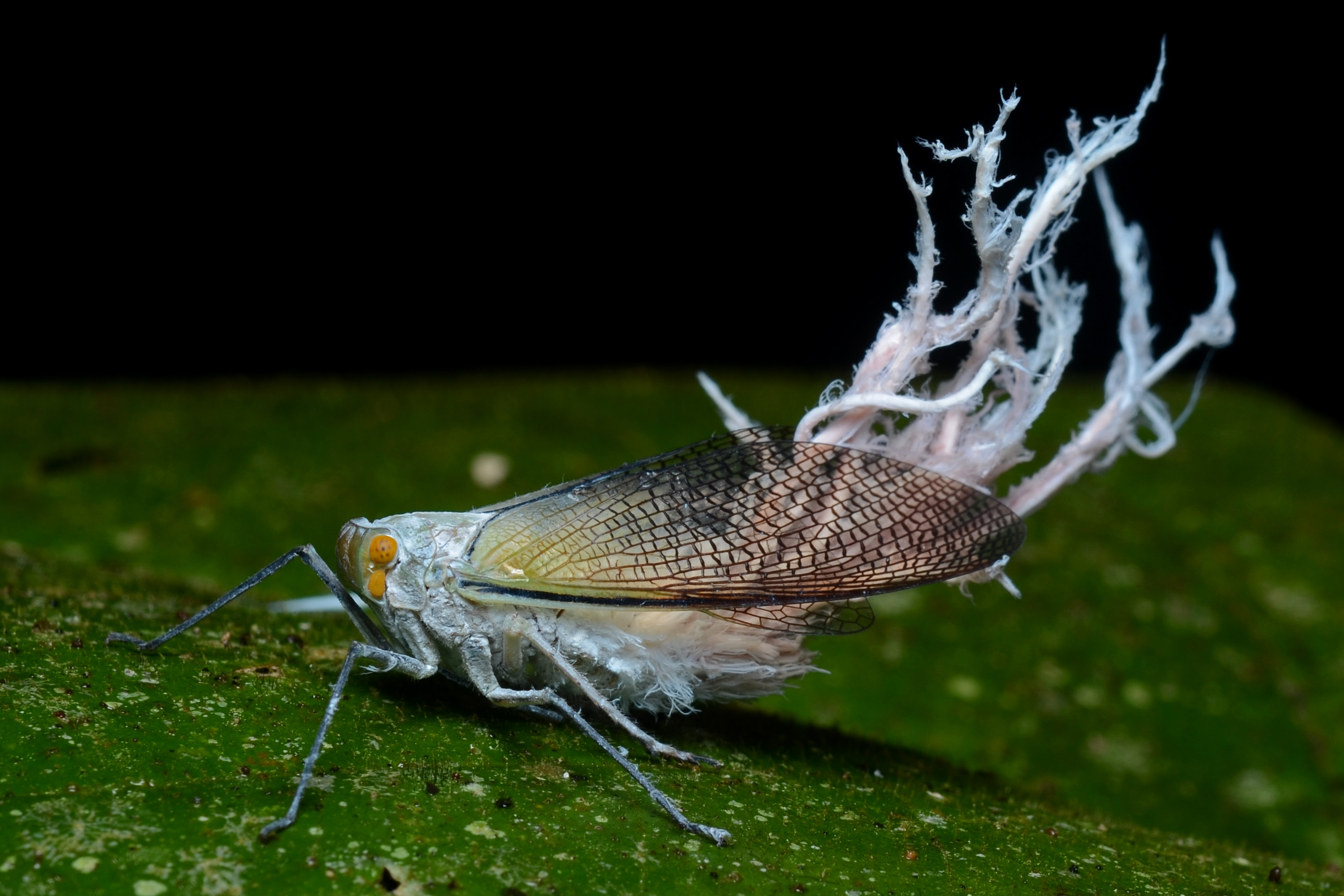
Planthopper (Fulgoridae: Pterodictya reticularis) with abdominal filaments of ketoester wax

Planthopper nymphs also possess a biological gear mechanism at the base of the hind legs, which keeps the legs in synchrony when the insects jump. The gears, not present in the adults, were known for decades before the recent description of their function.

Planthoppers are often vectors for plant diseases, especially phytoplasmas which live in the phloem of plants and can be transmitted by planthoppers when feeding.

A number of extinct planthopper taxa are known from the fossil record, such as the Lutetian-age Emiliana from the Green River Formation (Eocene) in Colorado.

Both planthopper adults and nymphs feed by sucking sap from plants; in so doing, the nymphs produce copious quantities of honeydew, on which sooty mould often grows. One species considered to be a pest is Haplaxius crudus, which is a vector for lethal yellowing, a palm disease that nearly killed off the Jamaican Tall coconut variety. Another is the spotted lanternfly, a planthopper native to parts of China and Vietnam, which has spread invasively in South Korea, Japan, and the United States.

== Classification ==
The infraorder contains two superfamilies, Fulgoroidea and Delphacoidea. As mentioned under Auchenorrhyncha, some authors use the name Archaeorrhyncha as a replacement for the Fulgoromorpha.

=== Superfamily Fulgoroidea ===
- Acanaloniidae
- Achilidae
- Achilixiidae
- Caliscelidae
- Derbidae
- Dictyopharidae
- Eurybrachidae (= Eurybrachyidae)
- Flatidae
- Fulgoridae
- Gengidae
- Hypochthonellidae
- Issidae (sometimes includes Caliscelidae)
- Kinnaridae
- Lophopidae
- Meenoplidae
- Nogodinidae
- Ricaniidae
- Tettigometridae
- Tropiduchidae

=== Superfamily Delphacoidea ===
- Borysthenidae
- Cixiidae
- Delphacidae

Extinct families include:

- †Dorytocidae Emeljanov and Shcherbakov 2018, monotypic, Burmese amber, Cenomanian
- †Fulgoridiidae Handlirsch 1939 Early-Upper Jurassic, Eurasia
- †Jubisentidae Zhang et al. 2019 Burmese amber, Cenomanian
- †Katlasidae Luo et al. 2020, monotypic, Burmese amber, Cenomanian
- †Lalacidae Hamilton 1990 Crato Formation, Brazil Lushangfen Formation, Yixian Formation, China, Aptian
- †Mimarachnidae Shcherbakov 2007 Early Cretaceous- early Late Cretaceous, Eurasia
- †Neazoniidae Szwedo 2007 Lebanese amber, Barremian, Charentese amber, France, Cenomanian
- †Perforissidae Shcherbakov 2007 Early Cretaceous- early Late Cretaceous, Argentina, Lebanon, Mongolia, Myanmar, Russia, Spain, New Jersey
- †Qiyangiricaniidae Szwedo et al. 2011 monotypic, Guanyintan Formation, China, Toarcian
- †Weiwoboidae Lin et al. 2010 monotypic, Yunnan, China, Eocene
- †Szeiiniidae Zhang et al. 2021 monotypic, Shaanxi, China, Late Triassic
- †Yetkhatidae Song et al. 2019 Burmese amber, Cenomanian

== Gallery ==
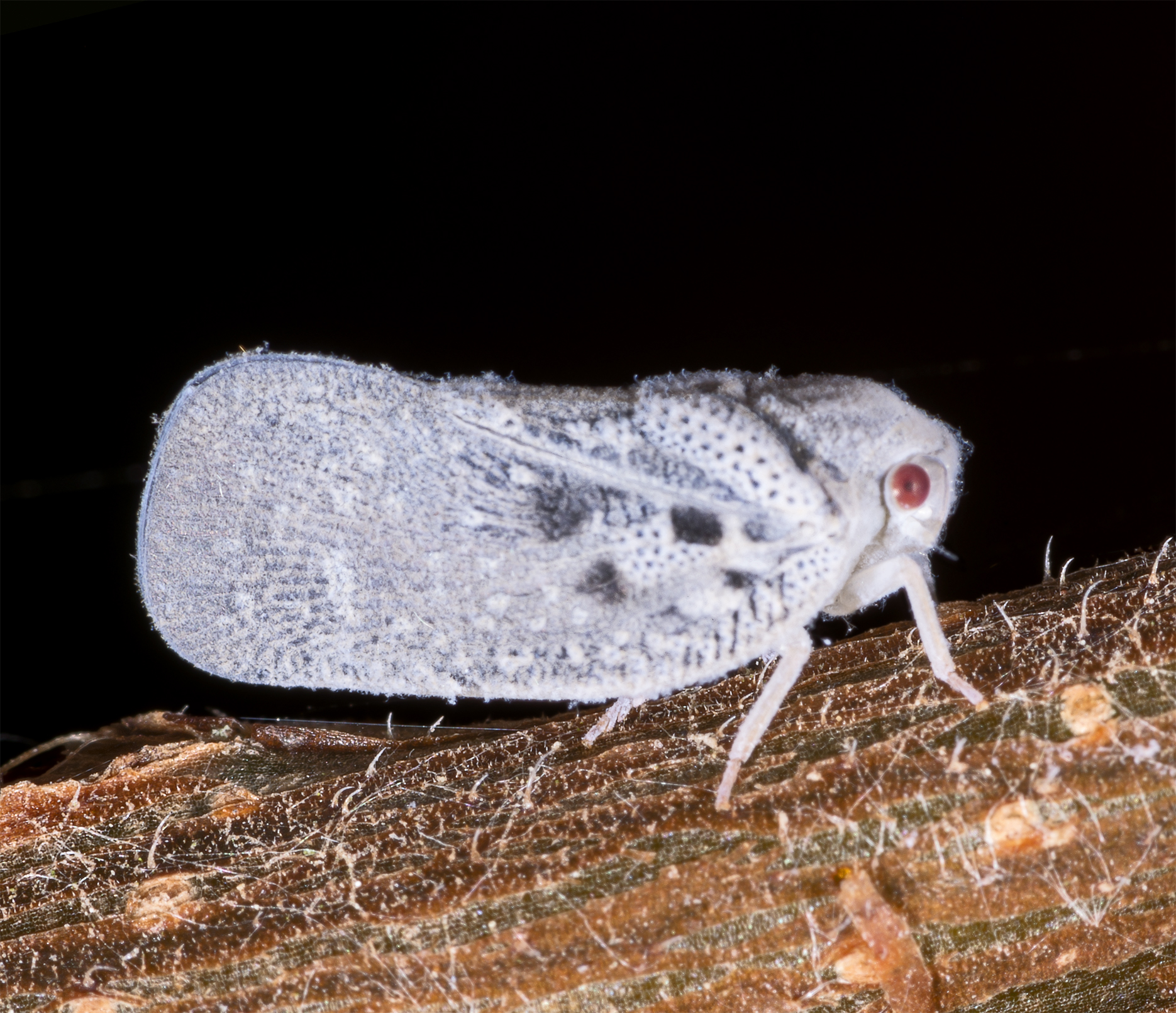
Metcalfa pruinosa (Flatidae)

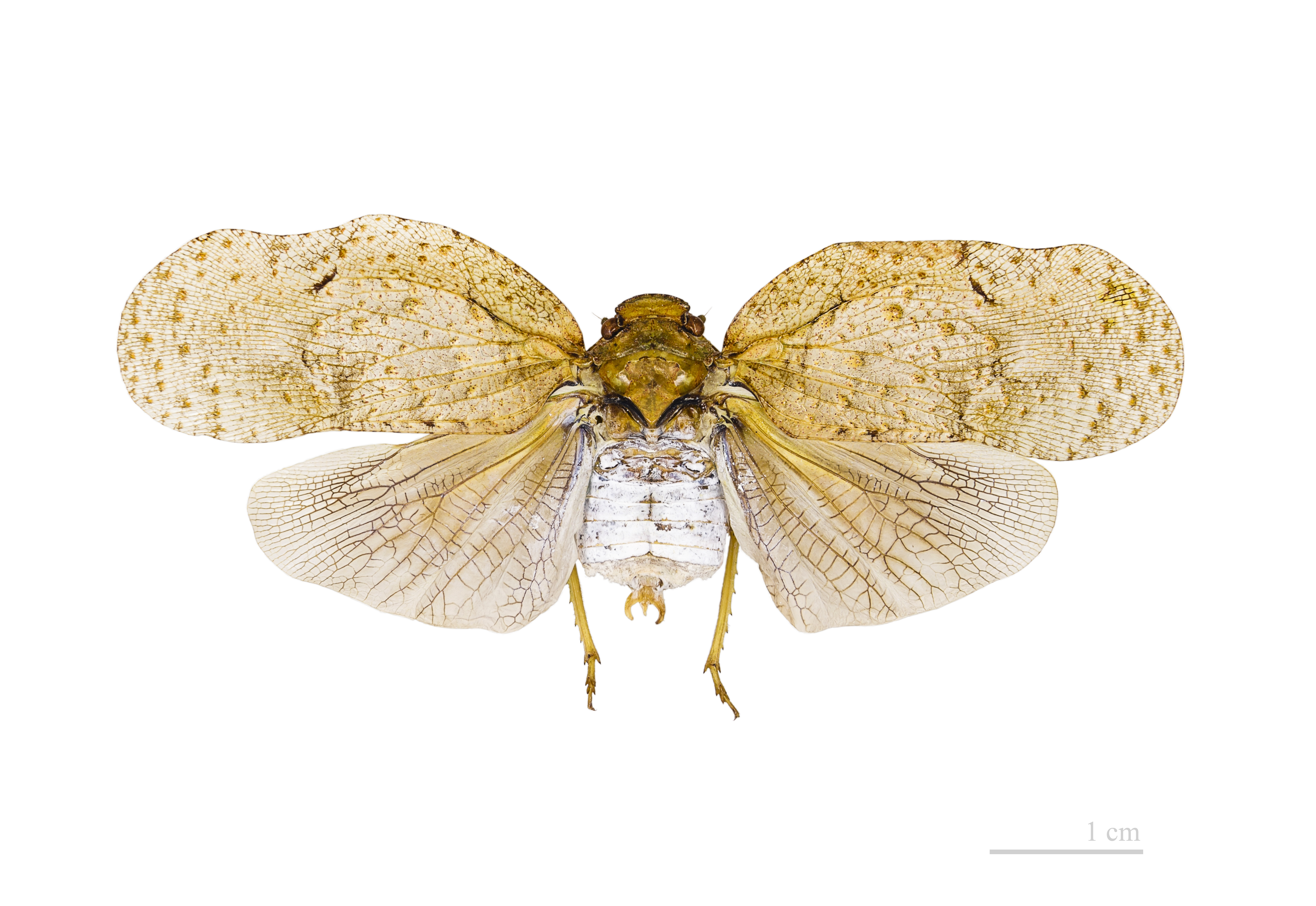
Flatolystra verrucosa (Fulgoridae)

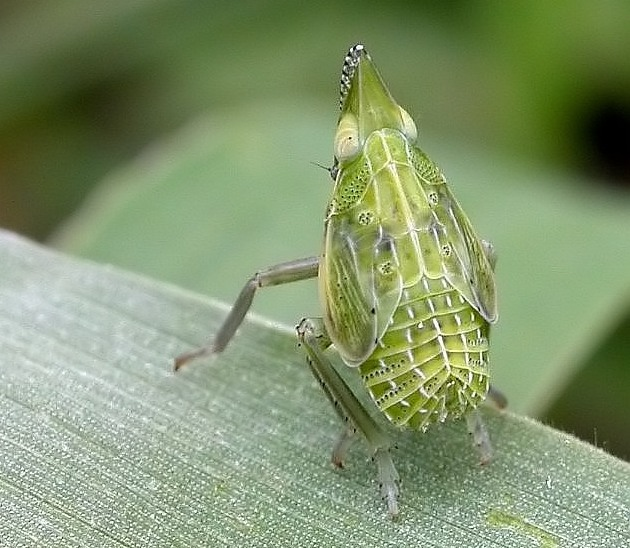
nymphal Dictyophara europaea (Dictyopharidae)

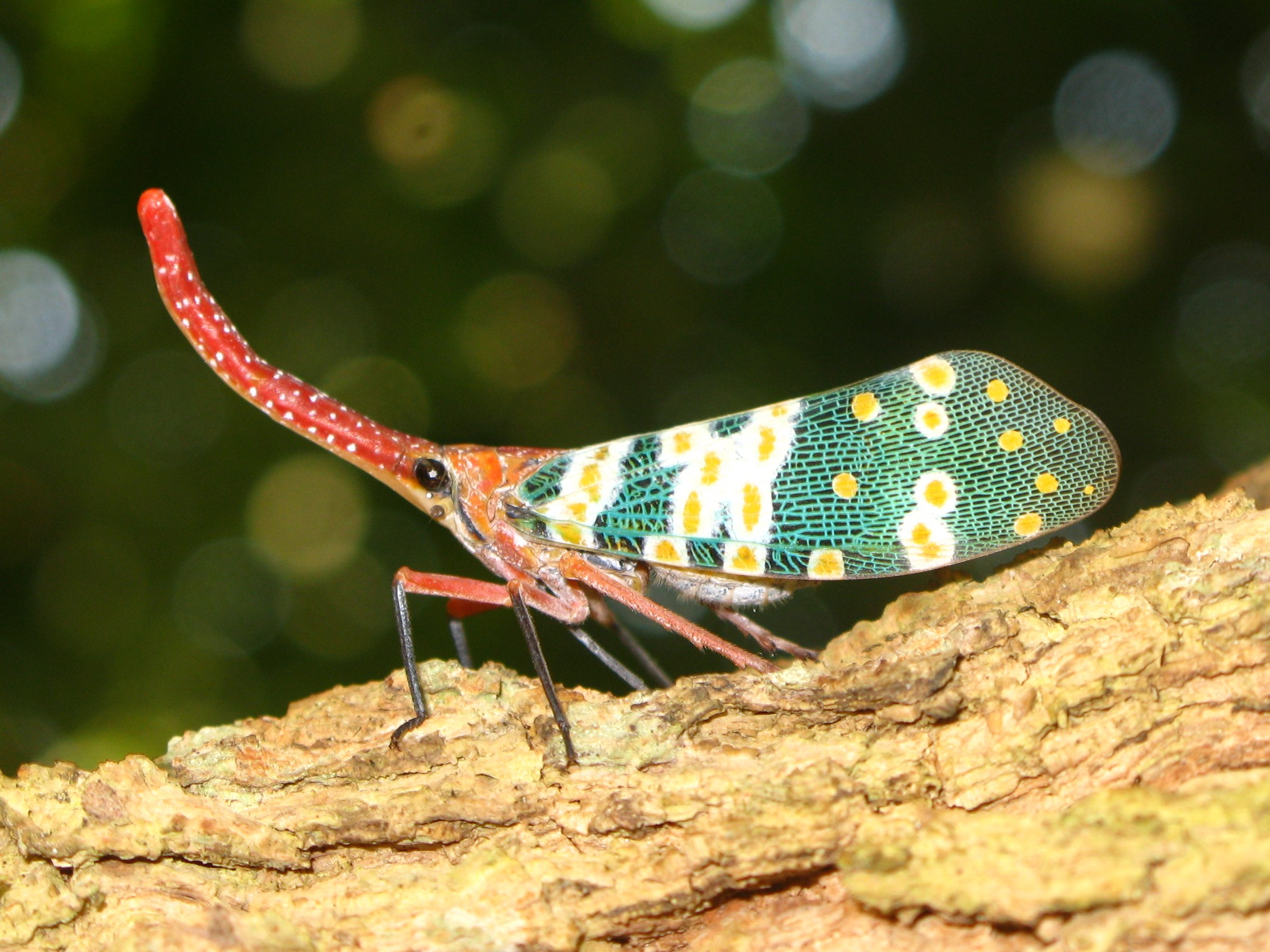
Pyrops candelaria (Fulgoridae)

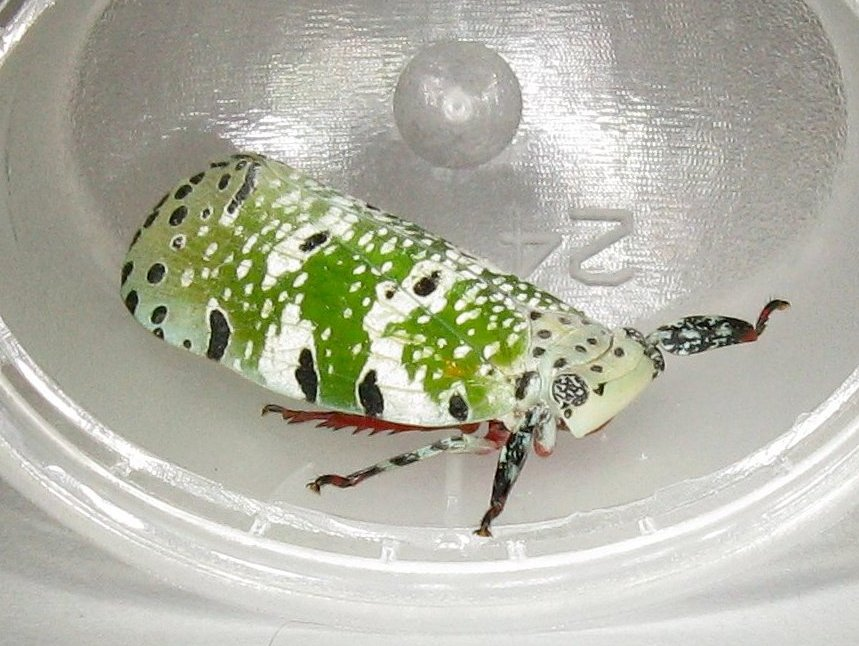
Paropioxys jucundus (Eurybrachidae)

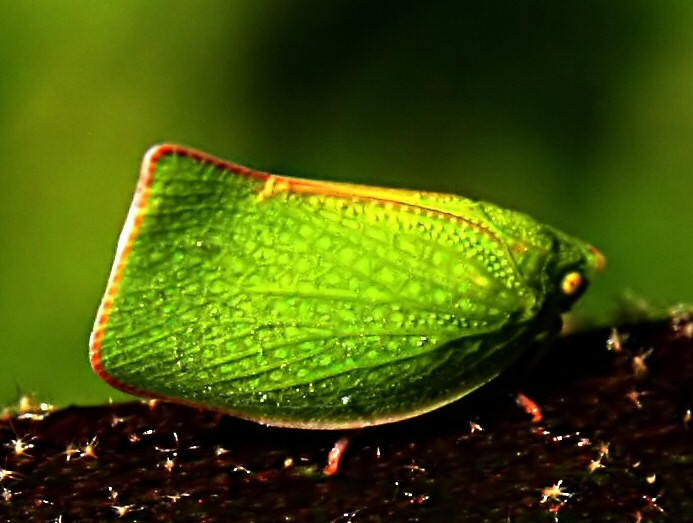
Siphanta acuta (Flatidae)

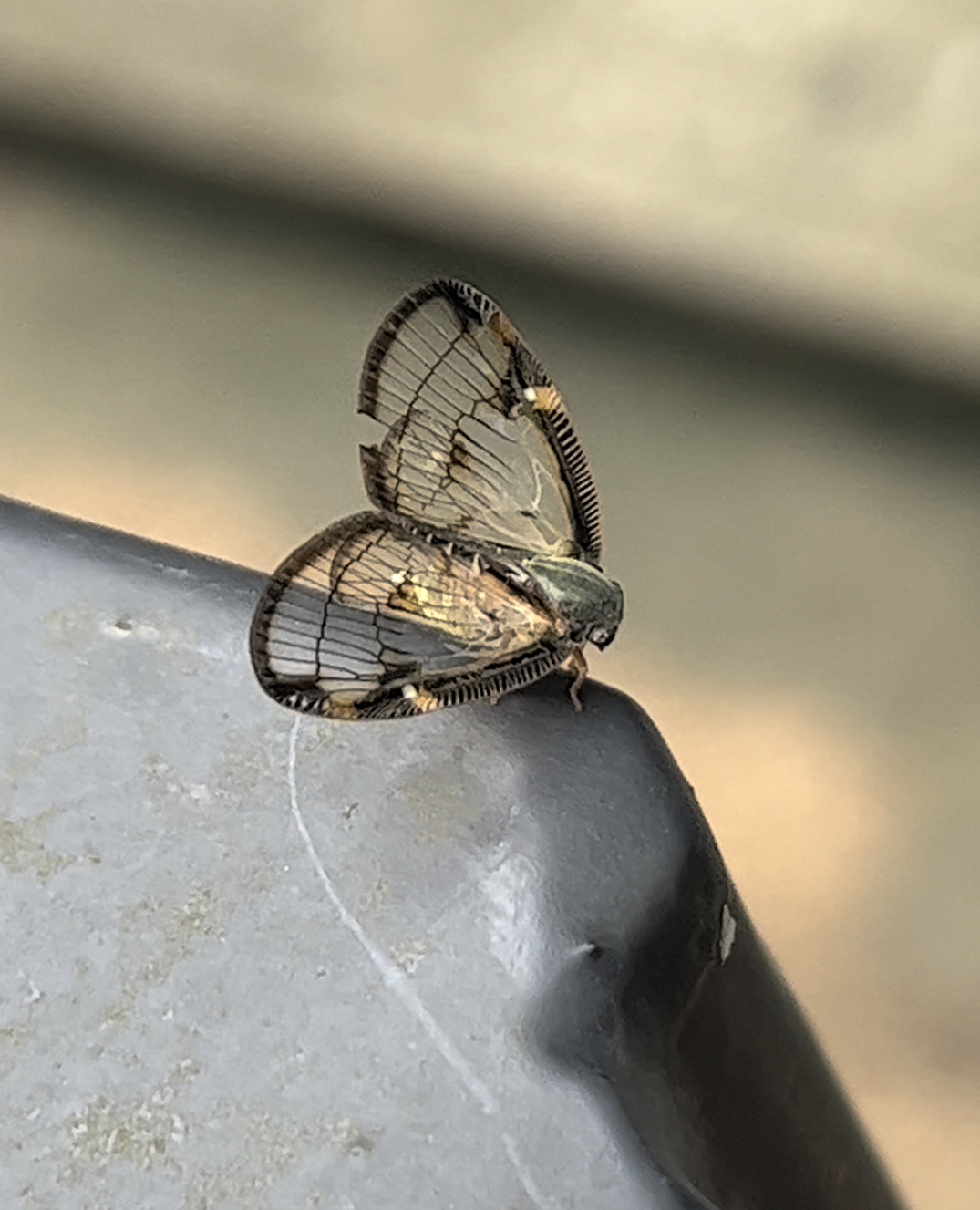
Euricania facialis (Ricaniidae)

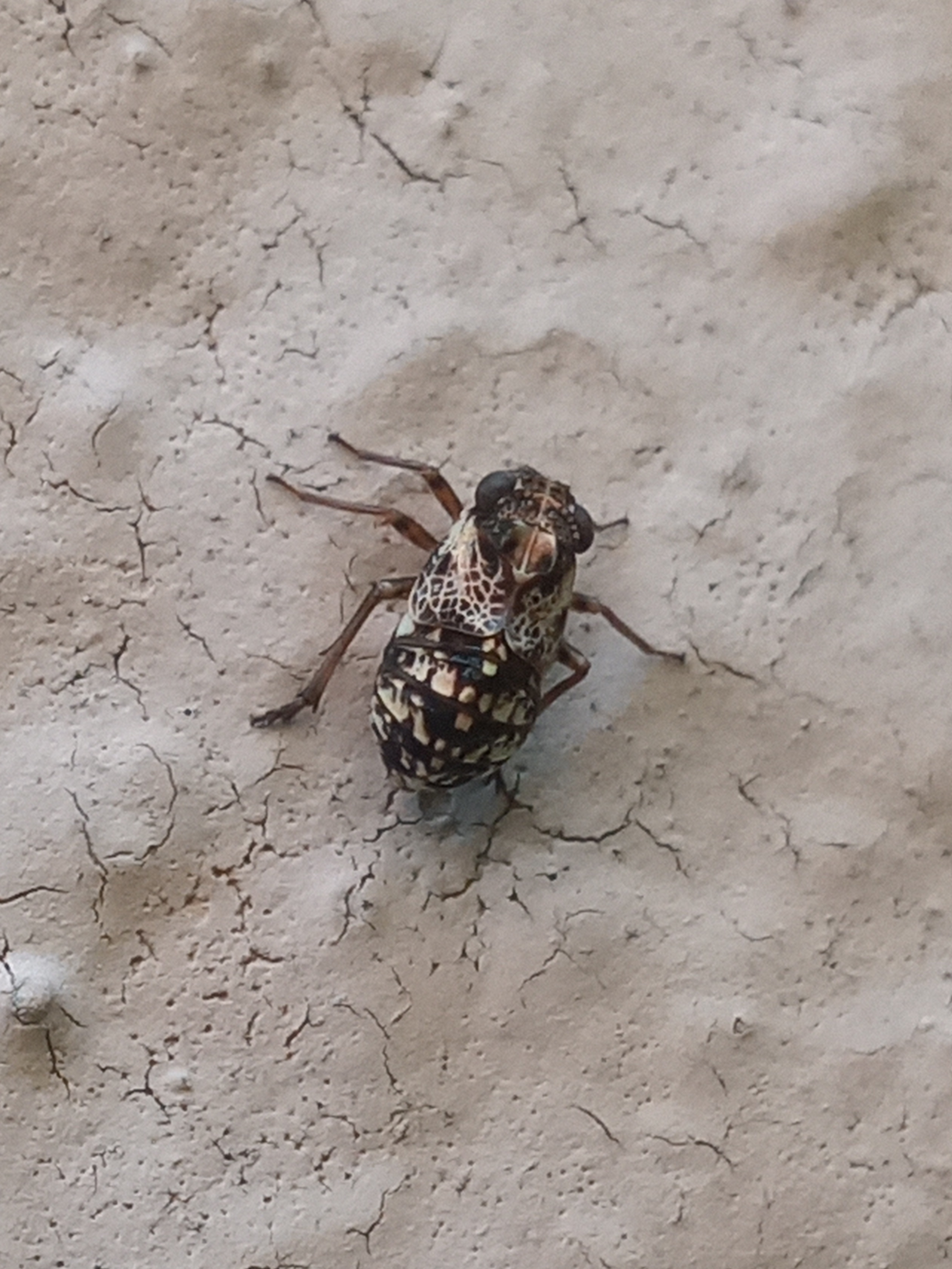
Bruchomorpha decorata (Caliscelidae)

Acanalonia conica (Acanaloniidae), on the underside of a milkweed leaf

Planthopper nymphs on coneflower stem. Includes a slow motion segment
