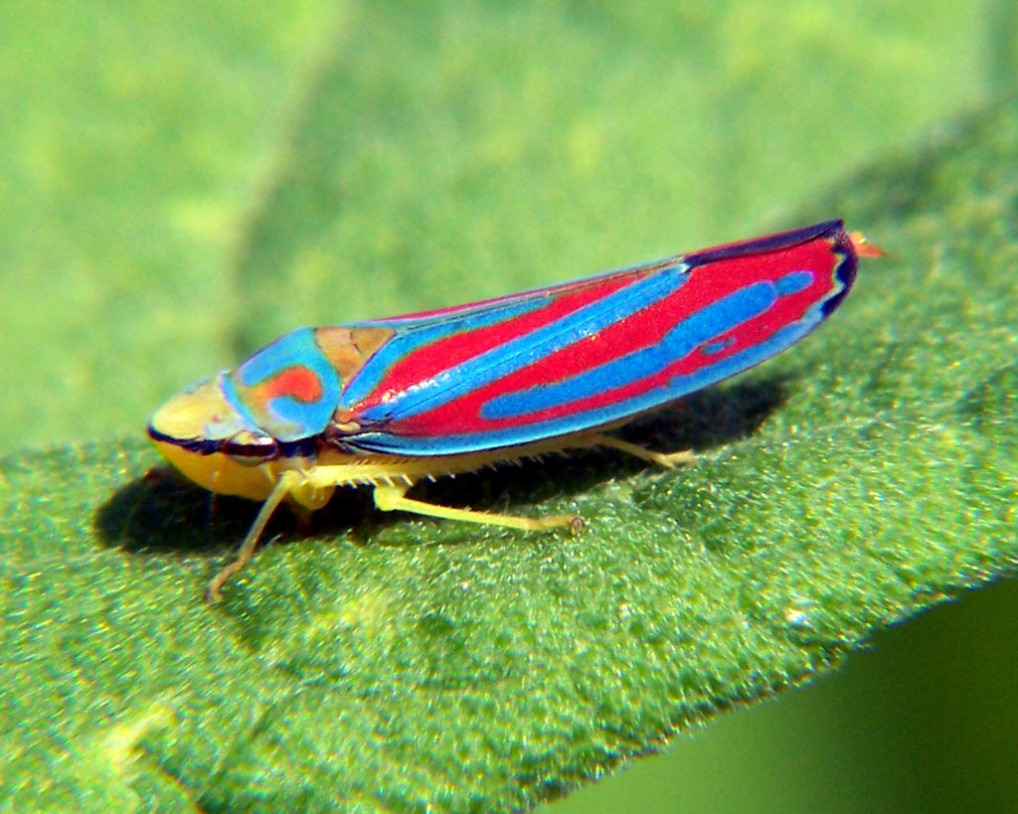
- Red-banded leafhopper, Graphocephala coccinea

Scientific classification
- Kingdom: Animalia
- Phylum: Arthropoda
- Clade: Pancrustacea
- Class: Insecta
- Order: Hemiptera
- Suborder: Auchenorrhyncha; Duméril, 1805

Infraorders
- Cicadomorpha; Fulgoromorpha

= Auchenorrhyncha =

Suborder of insects

The Auchenorrhyncha suborder of the Hemiptera contains most of the familiar members of what was called the "Homoptera" – groups such as cicadas, leafhoppers, treehoppers, planthoppers, and spittlebugs. The aphids and scale insects are the other well-known "Homoptera", and they are in the suborder Sternorrhyncha.

Distributed worldwide, all members of this group are plant-feeders, and many are vectors of viral and fungal diseases of plants.

It is also common for Auchenorrhyncha species to produce either audible sounds or substrate vibrations as a form of communication. Such calls range from vibrations inaudible to humans, to the calls of many species of cicadas that can be heard for hundreds of metres, at least. In season, they produce the most characteristic and ubiquitous noise of the bush.

== Etymology ==
The word "Auchenorrhyncha" is derived from the Greek words αὐχήν (auchēn), meaning "neck" or "throat," and ῥύγχος (rhynchos), meaning "snout".

== Classification ==
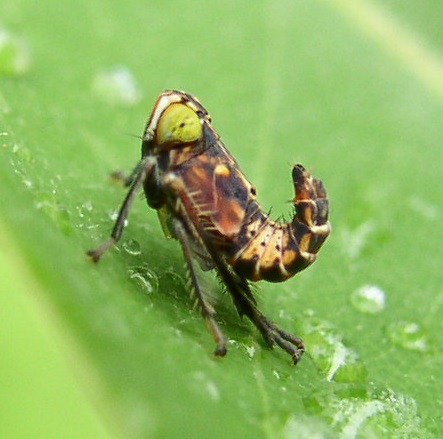
Jikradia olitoria, nymph (Cicadellidae)

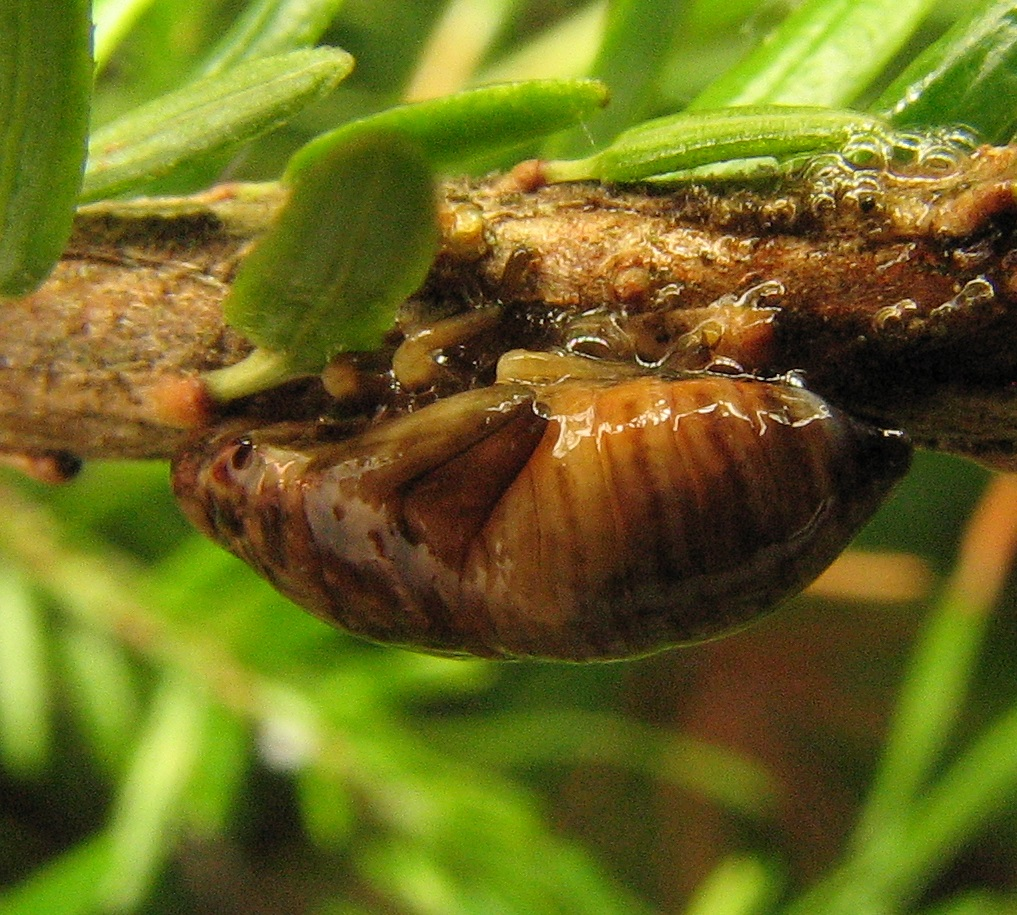
Aphrophora sp., nymph (Aphrophoridae)

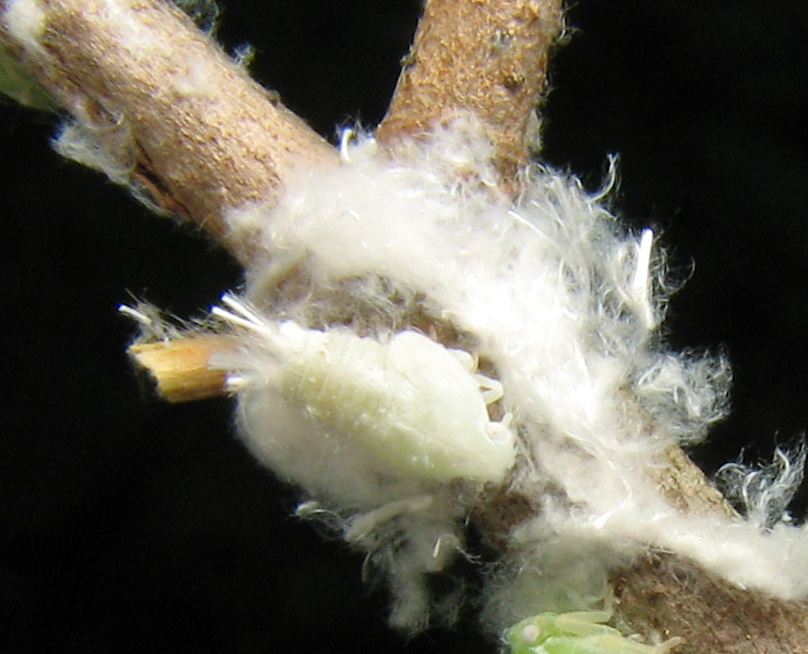
Metcalfa pruinosa, nymphs (Flatidae)

Green coneheaded planthoppers, Acanalonia conica in the infraorder Fulgoromorpha, on the underside of a milkweed leaf.

Planthopper nymphs on coneflower stem. Includes a slow motion segment

Debate and uncertainty as to whether the Auchenorrhyncha is a monophyletic group or not is ongoing; some authors, believing it was not, split it into two suborders, the Clypeorrhyncha (= Cicadomorpha) and the Archaeorrhyncha (= Fulgoromorpha). In the last ten years, there has been evidence to support the monophyletic interpretation, and the most recent research indicates the Auchenorrhyncha are in fact a monophyletic lineage. A classification of the Auchenorrhyncha is:

- Infraorder Cicadomorpha (Clypeorrhyncha, Clypeata)
  - Superfamily Cercopoidea (spittlebugs, froghoppers)
    - Aphrophoridae
    - Cercopidae
    - Clastopteridae
    - Epipygidae
    - Machaerotidae
  - Superfamily Cicadoidea (cicadas)
    - Cicadidae (Platypediidae, Plautillidae, Tettigadidae, Tibicinidae)
    - Tettigarctidae (hairy cicadas)
  - Superfamily Membracoidea (Cicadelloidea)
    - Aetalionidae (Biturritiidae)
    - Cicadellidae (Eurymelidae, Hylicidae, Ledridae, Ulopidae, leafhoppers)
    - Melizoderidae
    - Membracidae (Nicomiidae, treehoppers)
    - Myerslopiidae (Cicadellidae, in part)
- Infraorder Fulgoromorpha (Archaeorrhyncha, planthoppers)
  - Superfamily Fulgoroidea
    - Acanaloniidae
    - Achilidae
    - Achilixiidae
    - Caliscelidae
    - Cixiidae
    - Delphacidae
    - Derbidae
    - Dictyopharidae
    - Eurybrachyidae
    - Flatidae
    - Fulgoridae (lanternflies)
    - Gengidae
    - Hypochthonellidae
    - Issidae
    - Kinnaridae
    - Lophopidae
    - Meenoplidae
    - Nogodinidae
    - Ricaniidae
    - Tettigometridae
    - Tropiduchidae
