= Perinetia =

Perinetia is a scientific name at the rank of genus, not currently in use for any organisms, though proposed for several. Historical uses may refer to:

- Aylaella Demir & Özdikmen, 2009 - formerly Perinetia Lallemand & Synave, 1954; a genus of planthoppers in the family Acanaloniidae
- Barnardetia Xing & Chen, 2013 - formerly Perinetia Barnard, 1959; a genus of crustaceans in the family Philosciidae
- Brygophis Domergue & Bour, 1989 - formerly Perinetia Domergue, 1988; a genus of snakes in the family Lamprophiidae
- Descampsiella Özdikmen, 2008 - formerly Perinetia Descamps, 1964; a genus of grasshoppers in the family Euschmidtiidae
- Madagascesa Kocak & Kemal, 2008 - formerly Perinetia Seyrig, 1952; a genus of wasps in the family Ichneumonidae
- Perinetia (eulophid) Risbec, 1952, a genus of wasps in the family Eulophidae
- Stenaroa Hampson, 1910 - formerly Perinetia Collenette, 1936; a genus of moths in the family Erebidae
