= Apteropeoedes elegans =

Scientific classification
- Domain: Eukaryota
- Kingdom: Animalia
- Phylum: Arthropoda
- Class: Insecta
- Order: Orthoptera
- Suborder: Caelifera
- Family: Euschmidtiidae
- Genus: Apteropeoedes
- Species: A. elegans

Binomial name
- Apteropeoedes elegans (Descamps, M., 1964)

Synonyms
- Chloromastax elegans Descamps, 1964

Species of grasshopper

Apteropeoedes elegans is a species of grasshoppers. It is found in Madagascar.
