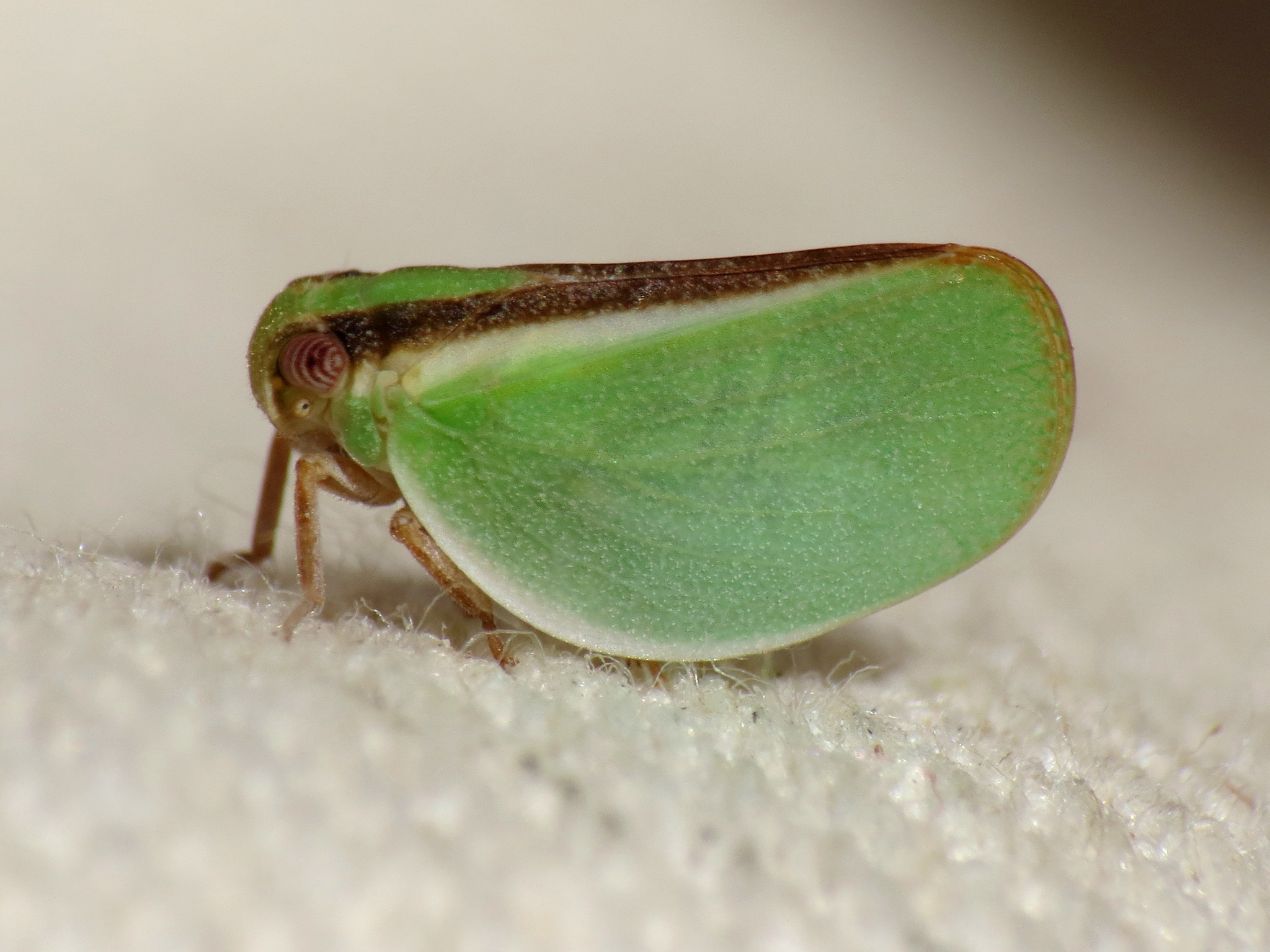

Scientific classification
- Domain: Eukaryota
- Kingdom: Animalia
- Phylum: Arthropoda
- Class: Insecta
- Order: Hemiptera
- Suborder: Auchenorrhyncha
- Infraorder: Fulgoromorpha
- Family: Acanaloniidae
- Genus: Acanalonia
- Species: A. fasciata

Binomial name
- Acanalonia fasciata Metcalf, 1923

= Acanalonia fasciata =

Species of planthopper

Acanalonia fasciata is a species of planthopper in the family Acanaloniidae. It can be found in the Southwestern United States and northwestern Mexico. Possible predators include several local species of dryinid wasp. It is a smaller species with a length varying from 4.2 to 6.2 mm. It is often confused with Acanalonia bivittata, but can be differentiated by its smaller size, lack of reticulation on the base of its elytra, and by its range being farther west.
