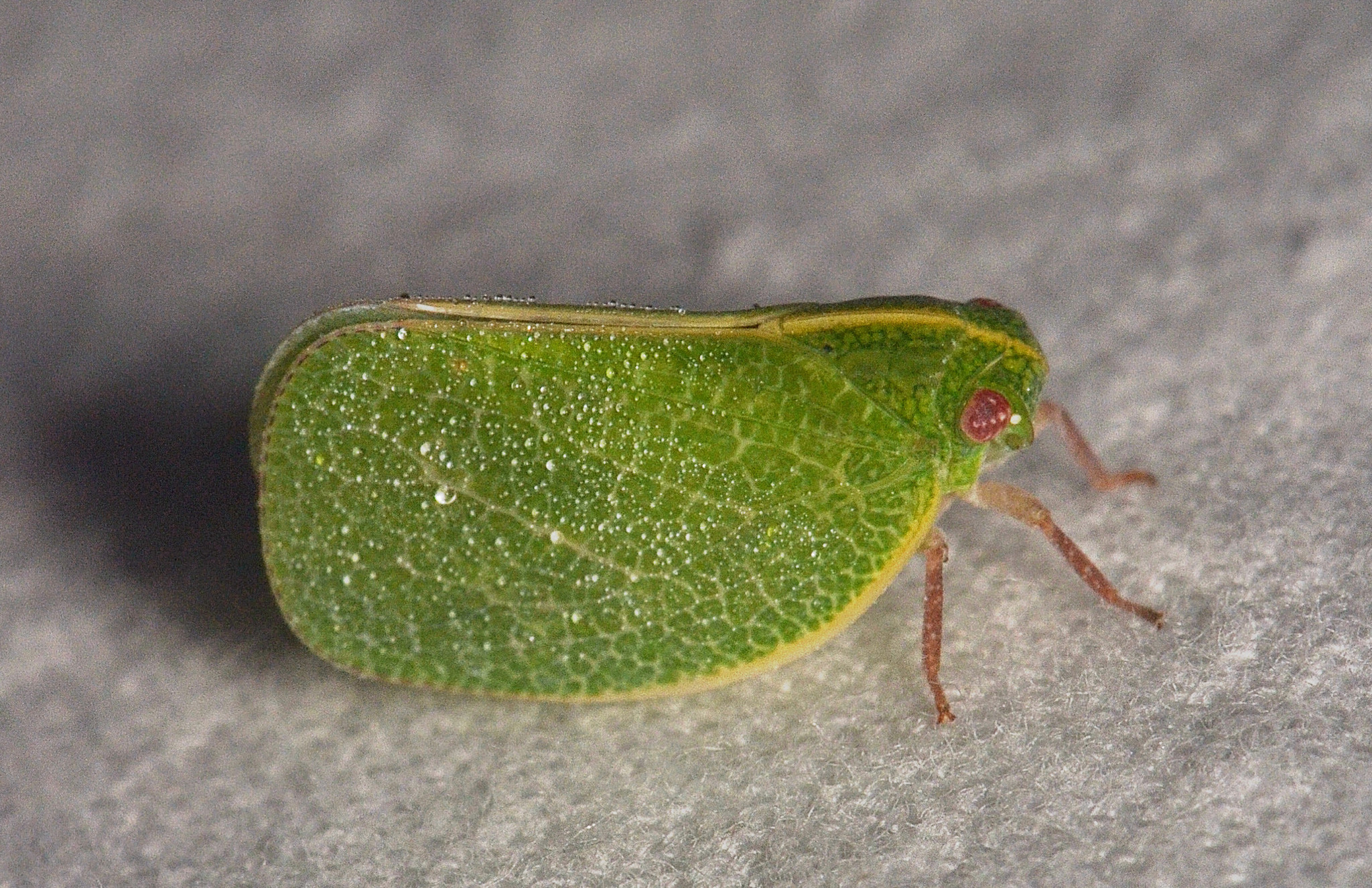
- From Florida

Scientific classification
- Domain: Eukaryota
- Kingdom: Animalia
- Phylum: Arthropoda
- Class: Insecta
- Order: Hemiptera
- Suborder: Auchenorrhyncha
- Infraorder: Fulgoromorpha
- Family: Acanaloniidae
- Genus: Acanalonia
- Species: A. servillei

Binomial name
- Acanalonia servillei Spinola, 1839

= Acanalonia servillei =

Species of insect

Acanalonia servillei is a species of planthopper in the family Acanaloniidae. It is a widely distributed species, being found along the East Coast and Gulf Coast of the United States as far southwest as Texas and as far north as New York. It is also found on many Caribbean islands such as The Bahamas, Cuba, Hispaniola, and Jamaica. Like most planthoppers, it feeds on the sap of plants. It is noted as being associated with Capparis cynophallophora along with other plants in the caper family, though not exclusively. It is a quite large species for its family, usually measuring more than 9mm.

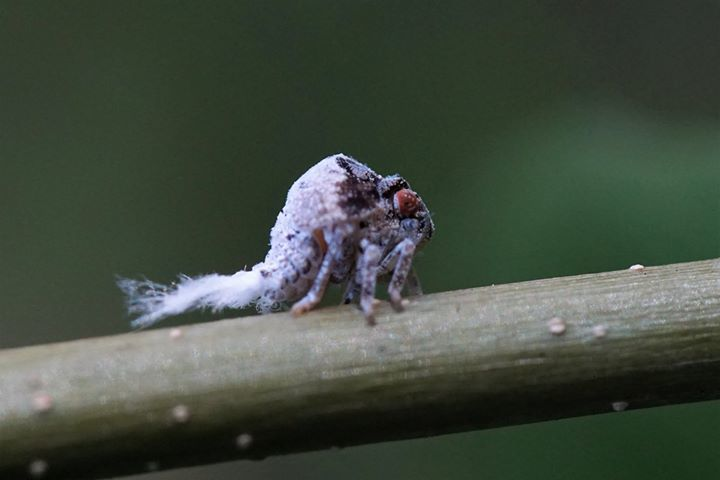
Nymph
