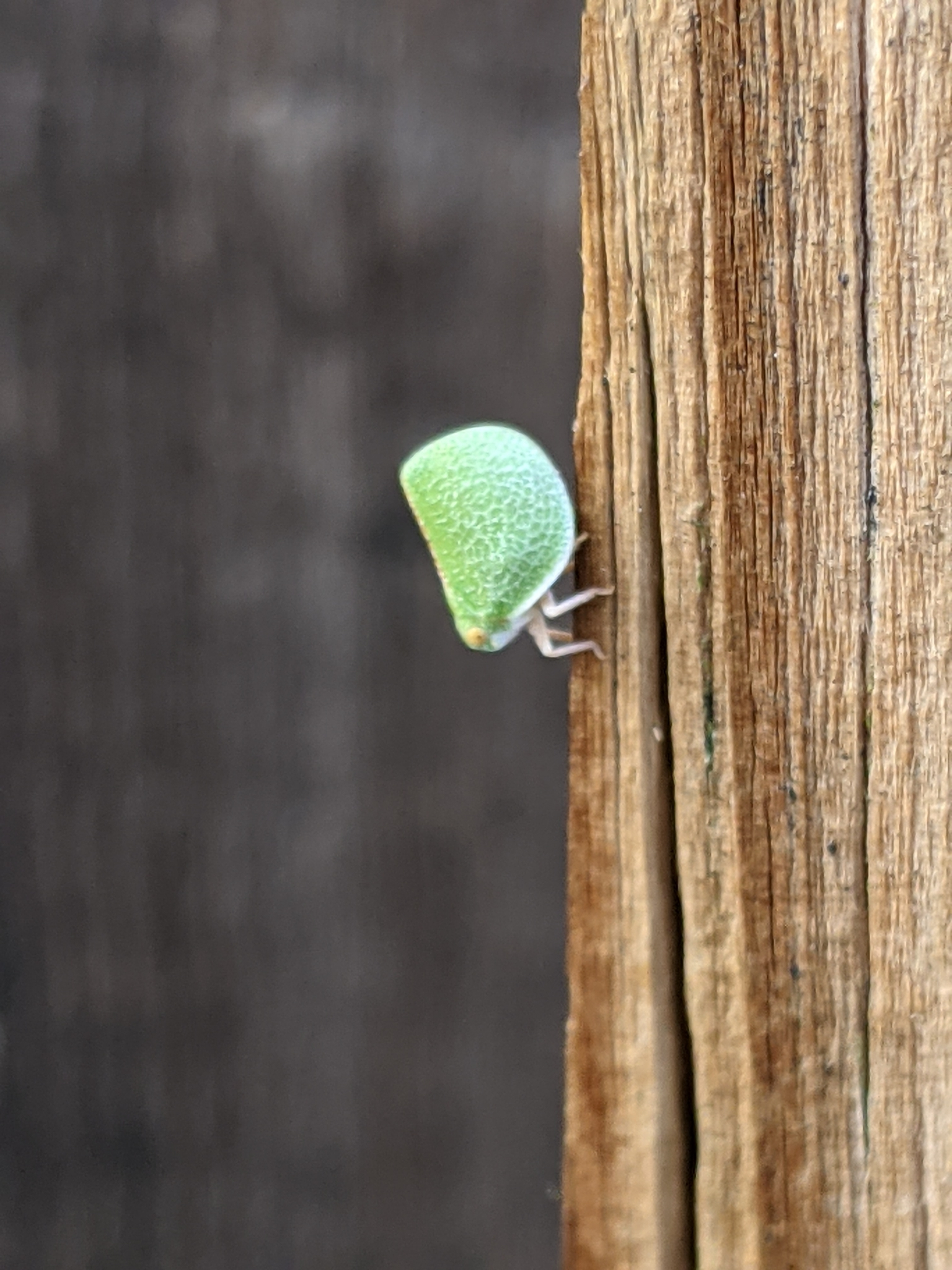

Scientific classification
- Domain: Eukaryota
- Kingdom: Animalia
- Phylum: Arthropoda
- Class: Insecta
- Order: Hemiptera
- Suborder: Auchenorrhyncha
- Infraorder: Fulgoromorpha
- Family: Acanaloniidae
- Genus: Acanalonia
- Species: A. similis

Binomial name
- Acanalonia similis Doering, 1932

= Acanalonia similis =

Species of planthopper

Acanalonia similis is a species of planthopper in the family Acanaloniidae. It is found in Texas, New Mexico, and Arizona. It is quite visually similar to Acanalonia invenusta, but though the two can be differentiated as A. similis has more prominent reticulation across its elytra than A. invenusta. A. similis measures 4.2 - 4.9 mm long.
