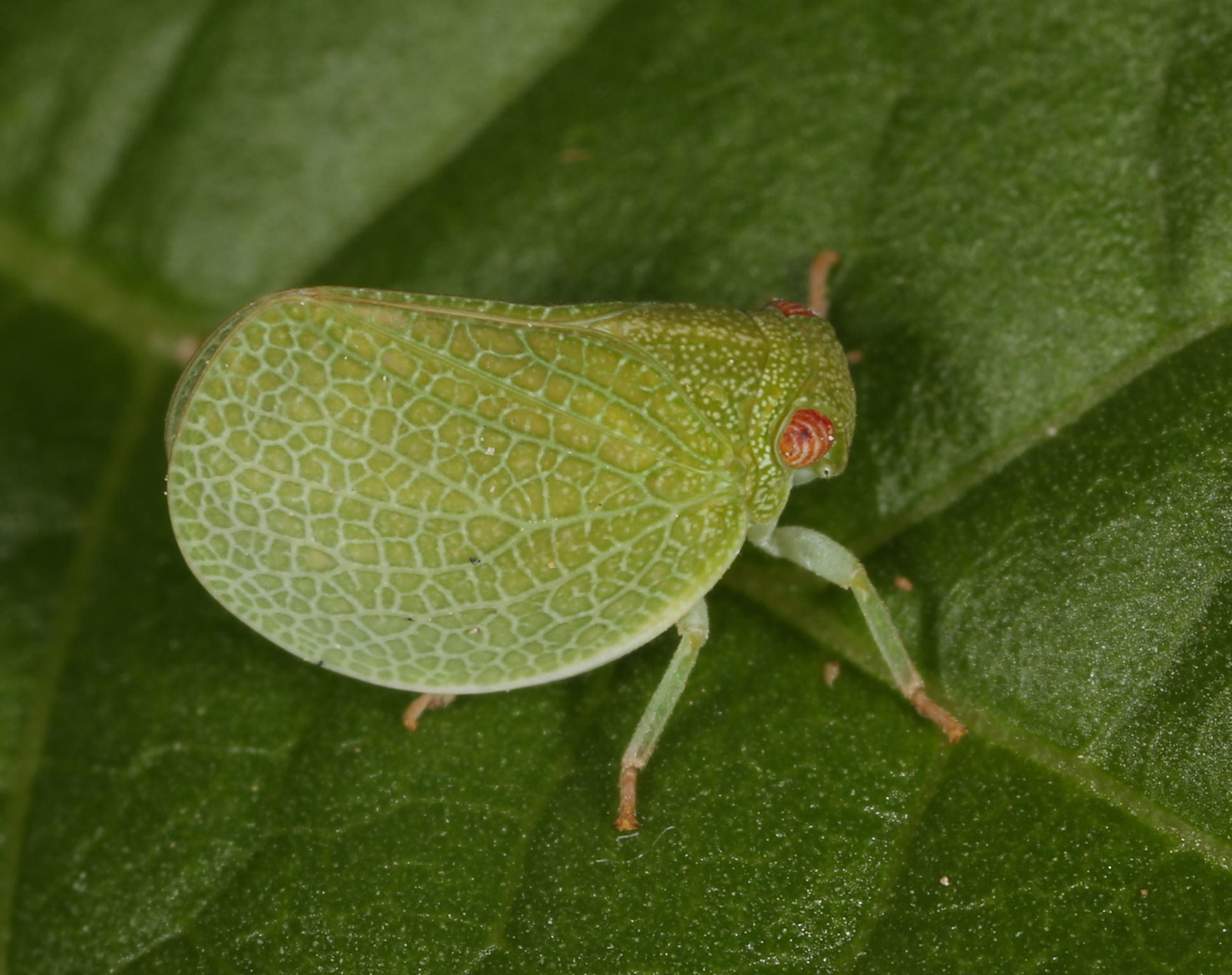

Scientific classification
- Domain: Eukaryota
- Kingdom: Animalia
- Phylum: Arthropoda
- Class: Insecta
- Order: Hemiptera
- Suborder: Auchenorrhyncha
- Infraorder: Fulgoromorpha
- Family: Acanaloniidae
- Genus: Acanalonia
- Species: A. immaculata

Binomial name
- Acanalonia immaculata (Kirkaldy, 1907)

= Acanalonia immaculata =

Species of insect

Acanalonia immaculata is a species of planthopper in the family Acanaloniidae. It can be found in southern New Mexico and Mexico. It is predated by dryinid wasps such as Apterodryinus torvus. A. immaculata can grow to 6.3 to 7.2 mm long.
