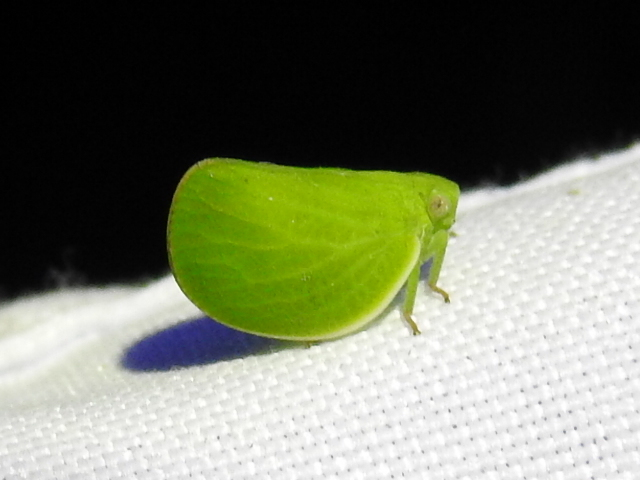

Scientific classification
- Kingdom: Animalia
- Phylum: Arthropoda
- Clade: Pancrustacea
- Class: Insecta
- Order: Hemiptera
- Suborder: Auchenorrhyncha
- Infraorder: Fulgoromorpha
- Family: Acanaloniidae
- Genus: Acanalonia
- Species: A. virescens

Binomial name
- Acanalonia virescens (Stål, 1864)

= Acanalonia virescens =

Species of insect

Acanalonia virescens is a species of planthopper in the family Acanaloniidae. It is found in coastal regions such as southern coastal Texas, the east coast of Mexico, and as far south as Panama. It was initially recorded in Florida, but has not been found there since.
