= Capparis elegans =

Scientific classification
- Kingdom: Plantae
- Clade: Tracheophytes
- Clade: Angiosperms
- Clade: Eudicots
- Clade: Rosids
- Order: Brassicales
- Family: Capparaceae
- Genus: Capparis
- Species: C. elegans

Binomial name
- Capparis elegans Mart.

Synonyms
- Capparidastrum elegans (Mart.) Hutch., 1967

Species of flowering plant

Capparis elegans is a flowering plant species in the genus Capparis found in Brazil.
