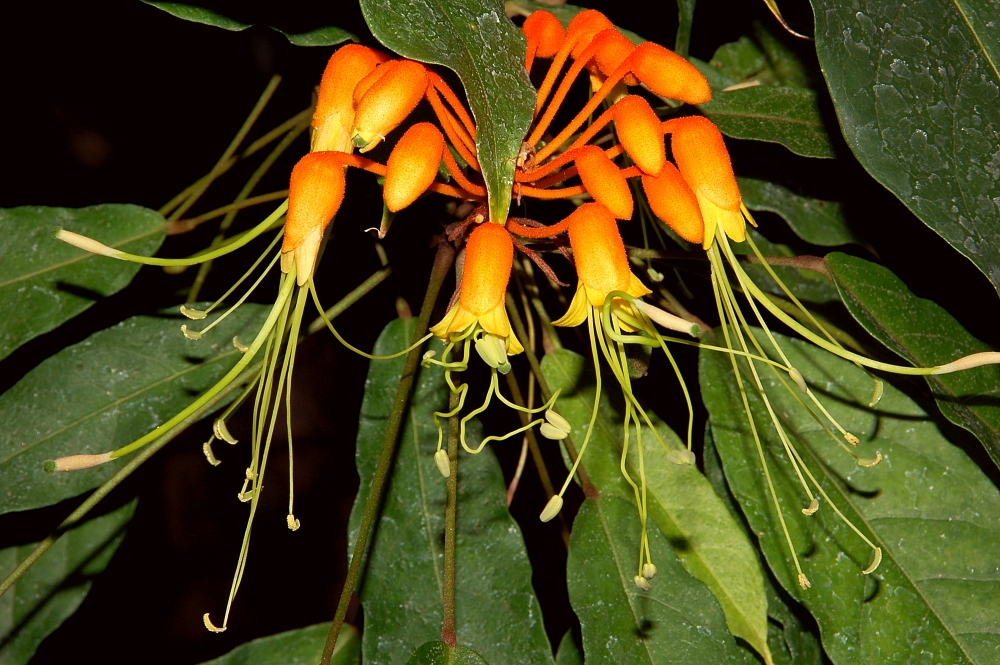
- Steriphoma paradoxum

Scientific classification
- Kingdom: Plantae
- Clade: Tracheophytes
- Clade: Angiosperms
- Clade: Eudicots
- Clade: Rosids
- Order: Brassicales
- Family: Capparaceae
- Genus: Steriphoma; Spreng.

= Steriphoma =

Genus of flowering plants

Steriphoma is a genus of flowering plant in family Capparaceae. It contains 11 species of which only 5 are accepted:

- Steriphoma ellipticum (DC.) Spreng.
- Steriphoma macranthum Standl.
- Steriphoma paradoxum (Jacq.) Endl.
- Steriphoma peruvianum Spruce ex Eichler
- Steriphoma urbani Eggers
