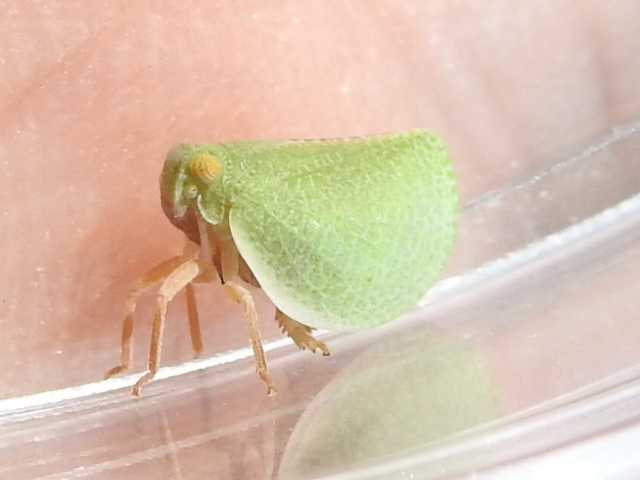

Scientific classification
- Domain: Eukaryota
- Kingdom: Animalia
- Phylum: Arthropoda
- Class: Insecta
- Order: Hemiptera
- Suborder: Auchenorrhyncha
- Infraorder: Fulgoromorpha
- Family: Acanaloniidae
- Genus: Acanalonia
- Species: A. invenusta

Binomial name
- Acanalonia invenusta Doering, 1932

= Acanalonia invenusta =

Species of insect

Acanalonia invenusta is a species of planthopper in the family Acanaloniidae. It is found in New Mexico, Texas, and northern Mexico. It is quite visually similar to Acanalonia similis, though the two can be differentiated by A. invenusta having less prominent reticulation across its elytra. It measures 4.2 - 5.6 mm.
