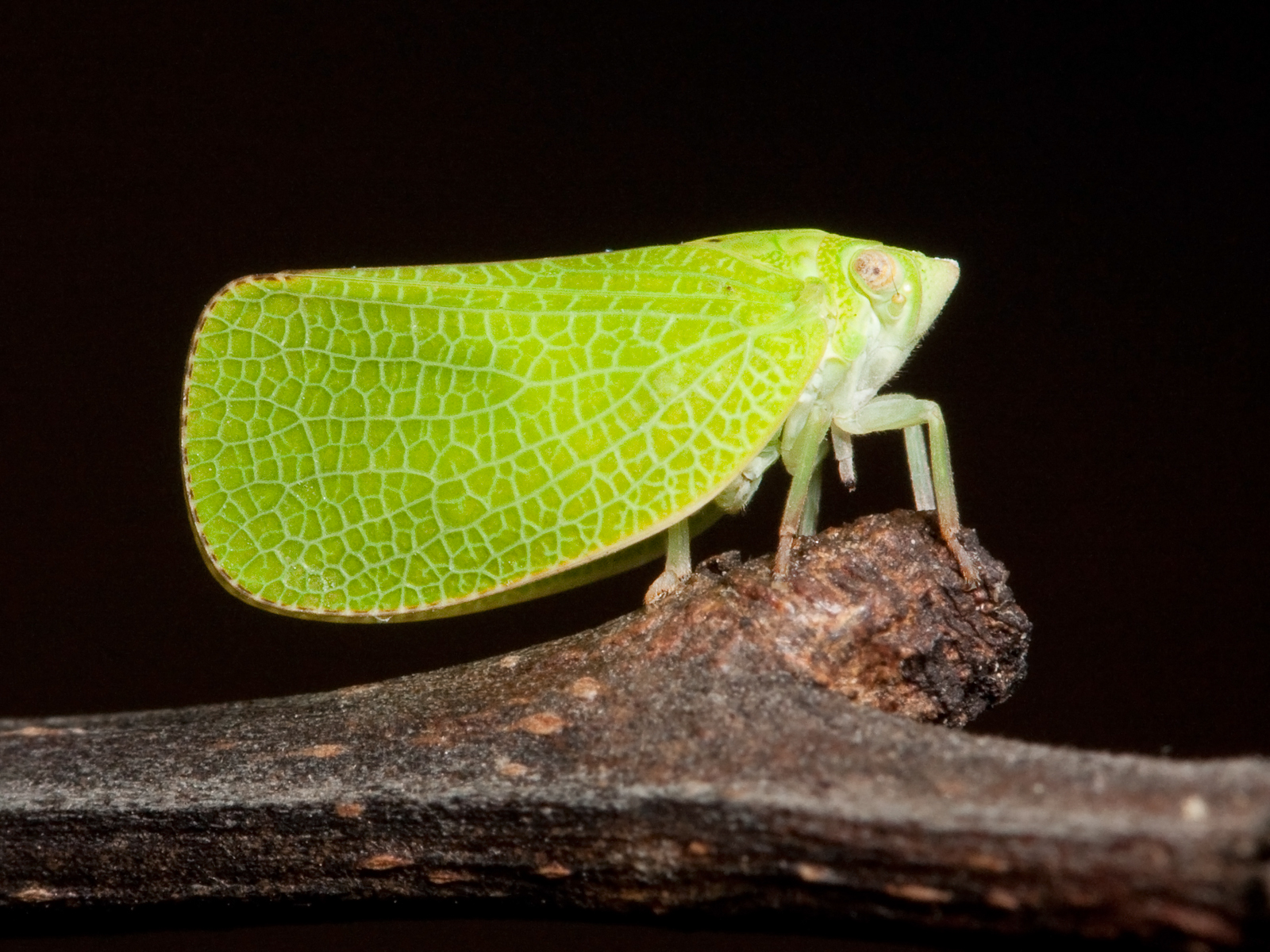
- Acanalonia conica

Scientific classification
- Domain: Eukaryota
- Kingdom: Animalia
- Phylum: Arthropoda
- Class: Insecta
- Order: Hemiptera
- Suborder: Auchenorrhyncha
- Infraorder: Fulgoromorpha
- Family: Acanaloniidae
- Genus: Acanalonia; Spinola, 1839

Type species
- Acanalonia servillei Spinola, 1839

Species
- See text

Synonyms
- Acanonia Amyot & Serville, 1843; Amphiscepa Glover, 1878 [nec. Germar 1830]; Acalonia Kramer, 1950 (misspelling)

= Acanalonia =

Genus of true bugs

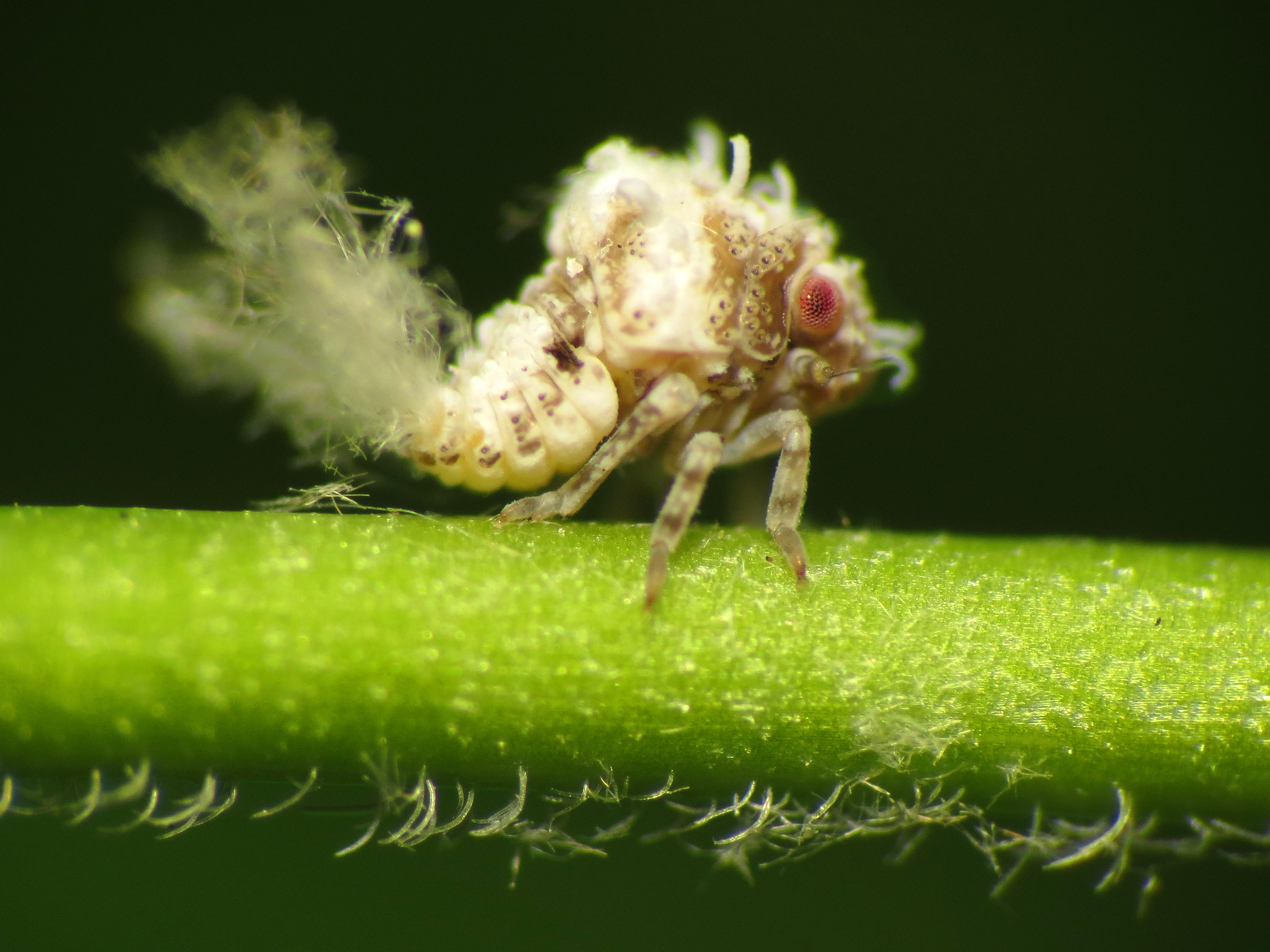
Nymph

Acanalonia is a genus of planthopper and contains the majority of the species within the family Acanaloniidae. Species have been recorded from southern Europe and the Americas.

== Description ==
They are generally about 10mm or less in length and are mostly green in colour, though some species have pink or tan forms. Like the rest of the Acanaloniidae family, the nymphs and adults feed mostly on the above-ground portions of woody and semi-woody plants and species have one generation per year.

Species include:

- Acanalonia affinis Fowler, 1900
- Acanalonia albacosta Caldwell, 1947
- Acanalonia bivittata (Say, 1825);
- Acanalonia bonducellae Fennah, 1955
- Acanalonia caelata Fowler, 1900
- Acanalonia calida (Fowler, 1904);
- Acanalonia carinata Metcalf & Bruner, 1930
- Acanalonia caymanensis Fennah, 1971
- Acanalonia chloris (Berg, 1879);
- Acanalonia clarionensis Van Duzee, 1933
- Acanalonia clypeata Van Duzee, 1908
- Acanalonia coacta Schmidt, 1908
- Acanalonia concinnula Fowler, 1900;
- Acanalonia conica (Say, 1830);
- Acanalonia consors Fennah, 1971
- Acanalonia decens (Stål, 1864);
- Acanalonia delicatula Fowler, 1900
- Acanalonia dubia Fowler, 1900
- Acanalonia ecuadoriensis Schmidt, 1908
- Acanalonia excavata Van Duzee, 1933
- Acanalonia fasciata Metcalf, 1923
- Acanalonia gaumeri Fowler, 1900
- Acanalonia grandicella Doering, 1932
- Acanalonia gundlachi Metcalf & Bruner, 1930
- Acanalonia hadesensis Caldwell, 1938
- Acanalonia hewanorrae Fennah, 1955
- Acanalonia humeralis Caldwell, 1947
- Acanalonia immaculata (Kirkaldy, 1907);
- Acanalonia inclinata Melichar, 1901
- Acanalonia ingens Fennah, 1971
- Acanalonia insularis Metcalf & Bruner, 1930
- Acanalonia invenusta Doering, 1932
- Acanalonia laticosta Doering, 1932
- Acanalonia laurifolia (Walker, 1858);
- Acanalonia lineata (Metcalf, Bruner, 1930)
- Acanalonia mintho Fennah, 1965
- Acanalonia mollicula Van Duzee, 1914
- Acanalonia ohausi Schmidt, 1908
- Acanalonia parva Doering, 1932;
- Acanalonia phorcys Fennah, 1971
- Acanalonia plana (Van Duzee, 1907);
- Acanalonia planata Ball, 1933
- Acanalonia puella Van Duzee, 1923
- Acanalonia pumila (Van Duzee, 1908);
- Acanalonia robusta (Walker 1851);
- Acanalonia saltonia Ball, 1933
- Acanalonia servillei Spinola, 1839;
- Acanalonia similis Doering, 1932
- Acanalonia sublinea (Walker, 1858); Stål, 1862 and Poeciloptera sublinea Walker, 1858
- Acanalonia subpellucida (Fowler, 1904)
- Acanalonia tehuacana Caldwell, 1947
- Acanalonia theobromae Fennah, 1945
- Acanalonia tripartita Caldwell, 1947
- Acanalonia umbellicauda Fennah, 1945
- Acanalonia umbraculata (Fabricius, 1803);
- Acanalonia varipennis (Walker, 1858);
- Acanalonia viequensis Caldwell & Martorell, 1951
- Acanalonia virescens (Stål, 1864);
- Acanalonia viridica Schmidt, 1932
- Acanalonia viridis Melichar, 1901
- Acanalonia viriditerminata (Lethierry, 1881);
  - Acanalonia viriditerminata muscosa Fennah, 1955
  - Acanalonia viriditerminata sylvestris Fennah, 1955
- Acanalonia viridula Metcalf & Bruner, 1930

The following species were moved in 2012 to the new genus Bulldolonia Gnezdilov, 2012:

- Acanalonia brevifrons Muir, 1924: Synonym of Bulldolonia brevifrons (Muir, 1924)
- Acanalonia depressa Melichar, 1901: Synonym of Bulldolonia depressa (Melichar, 1901)
- Acanalonia impressa Metcalf & Bruner, 1930: Synonym of Bulldolonia impressa (Metcalf & Bruner, 1930)
