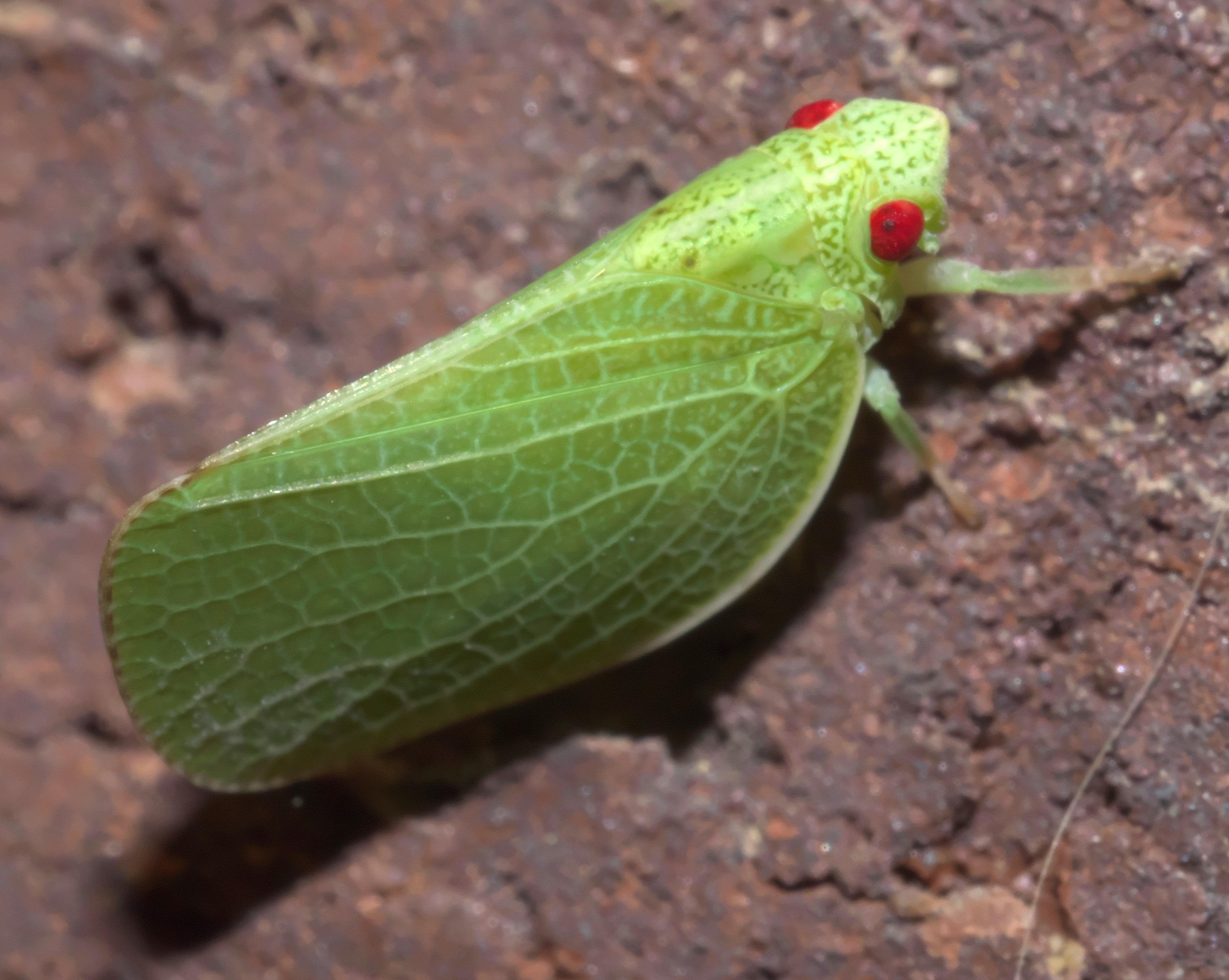
- Acanalonia conica

Scientific classification
- Kingdom: Animalia
- Phylum: Arthropoda
- Clade: Pancrustacea
- Class: Insecta
- Order: Hemiptera
- Suborder: Auchenorrhyncha
- Infraorder: Fulgoromorpha
- Family: Acanaloniidae
- Genus: Acanalonia
- Species: A. conica

Binomial name
- Acanalonia conica (Say, 1830)

= Acanalonia conica =

Species of true bug

Acanalonia conica is a species of planthopper in the family Acanaloniidae. It is found in North America and Europe. More accurately, it is native to North America, and was first found in Europe in Italy in 2003, most likely through human activity. It has since spread throughout Europe.

== Distribution ==
The species is native to the Nearctic realm, but has been found in Northern Italy for the first time in 2003. It was then found in Slovenia, Switzerland, France, Hungary, Austria, Romania, Bulgaria and Russia.

== Biology ==
A. conica is known to be a very polyphagous species, capable of developing on diverse host plants, including cultivated species. Since its introduction in Italy, the species has been observed to form populations much denser than the ones in its native range. It was estimated that due to its similarities to another introduced planthopper, Metcalfa pruinosa, it is at risk of spreading further and becoming a pest.

In its native range, A. conica is very often living in association with three flatid planthopper species.

== Life cycle ==
The species has only one generation per year (univoltine). Eggs are laid in the summer and in the Autumn, individually encased in concavities cut inside woody tissue of the plant host. Nymphs are brown in color and have a typical hump-backed, or generally more spherical shape. They are covered with long white waxy filaments. The adults are bright green, with a conic head, and bright red eyes. Their fore-wings display a visible network of veins. Both nymphs and adults produce abundant honeydew.

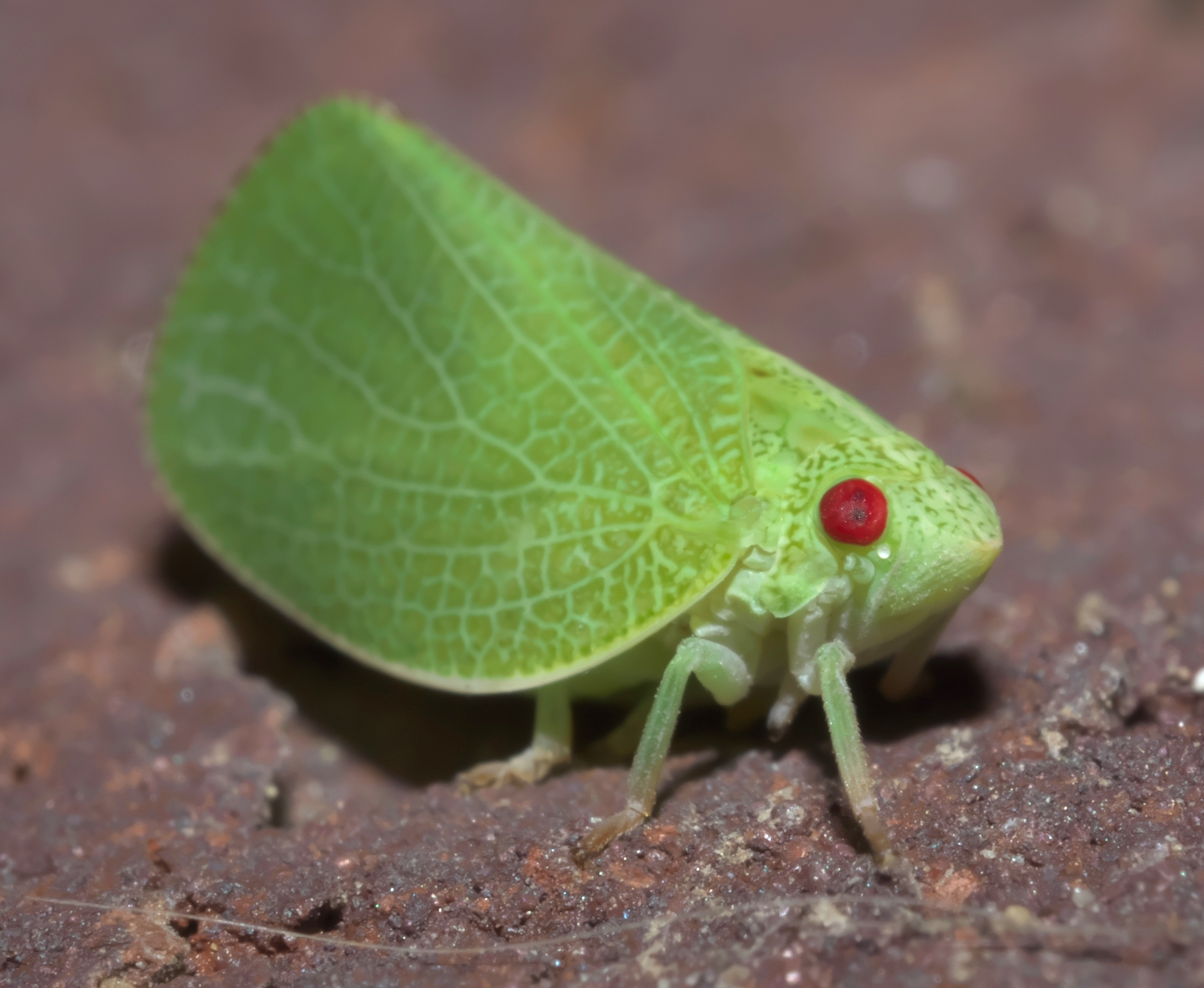
Acanalonia conica

Green coneheaded planthoppers, Acanalonia conica in the infraorder Fulgoromorpha, on the underside of a milkweed leaf.
