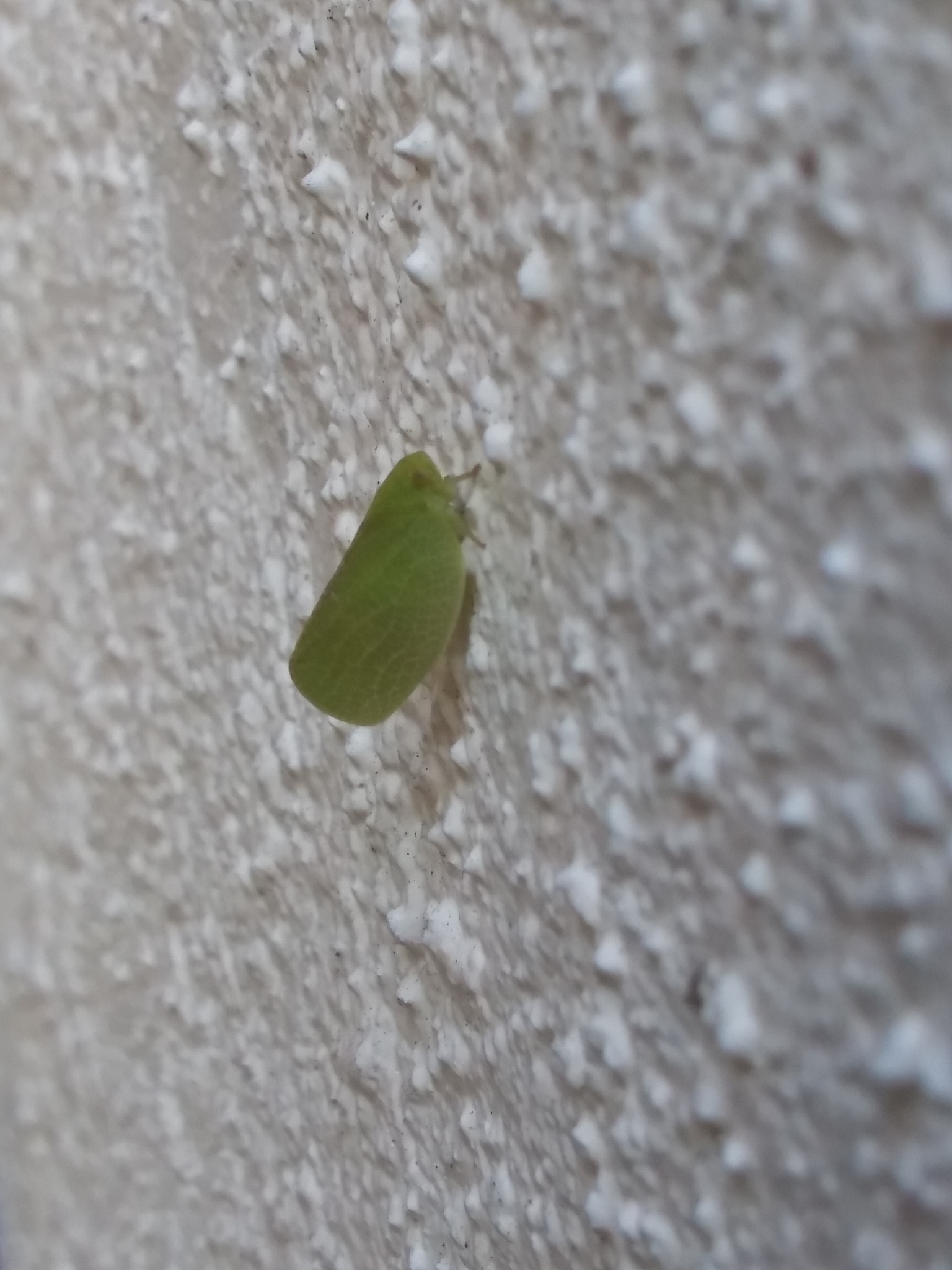

Scientific classification
- Kingdom: Animalia
- Phylum: Arthropoda
- Clade: Pancrustacea
- Class: Insecta
- Order: Hemiptera
- Suborder: Auchenorrhyncha
- Infraorder: Fulgoromorpha
- Family: Acanaloniidae
- Genus: Acanalonia
- Species: A. excavata

Binomial name
- Acanalonia excavata Van Duzee, 1933

= Acanalonia excavata =

Species of insects

Acanalonia excavata is a species of planthopper in the family Acanaloniidae. It is native to Nicaragua and is adventive in Florida. It is about 9 mm long.
