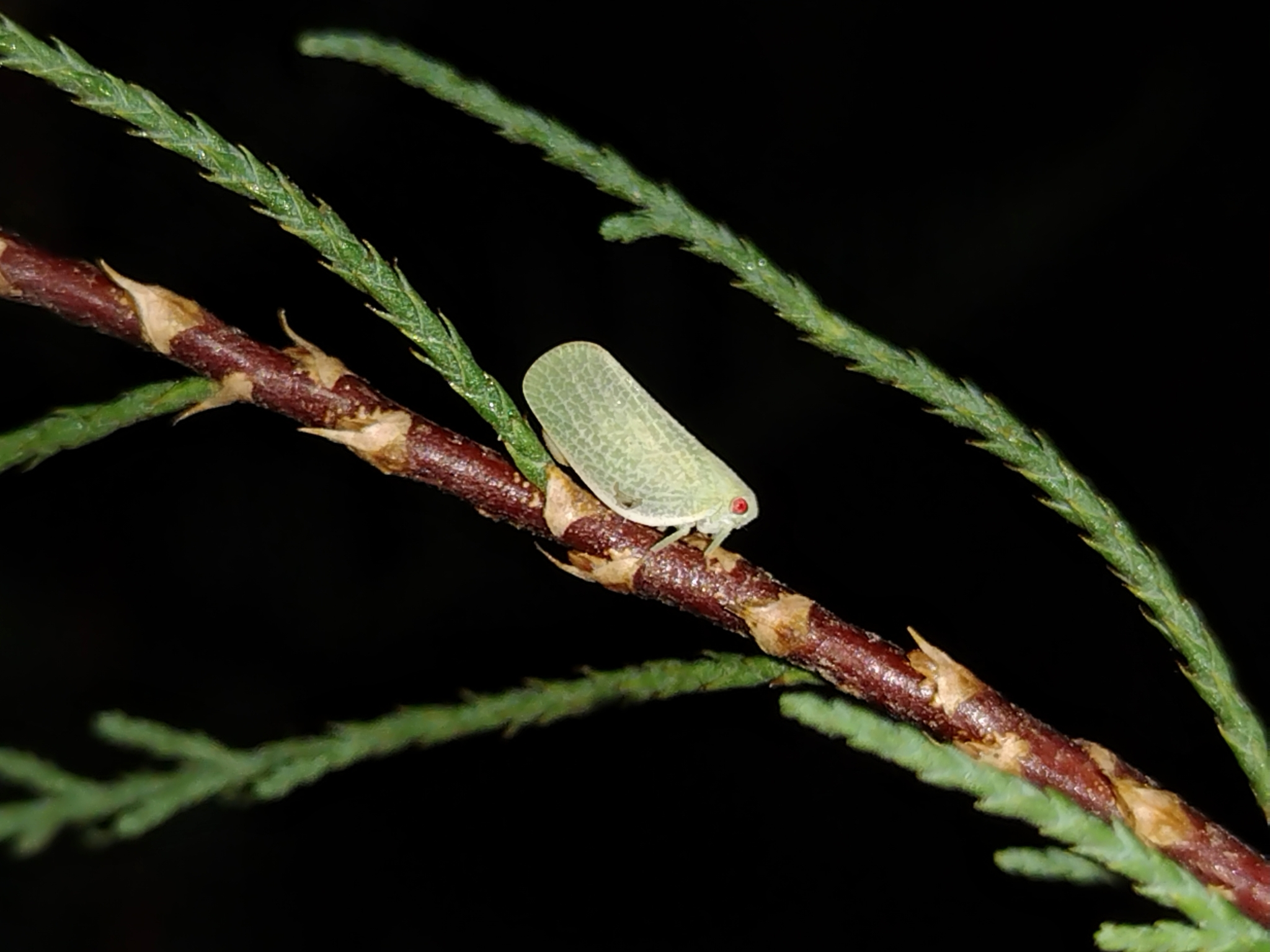

Scientific classification
- Domain: Eukaryota
- Kingdom: Animalia
- Phylum: Arthropoda
- Class: Insecta
- Order: Hemiptera
- Suborder: Auchenorrhyncha
- Infraorder: Fulgoromorpha
- Family: Acanaloniidae
- Genus: Acanalonia
- Species: A. clypeata

Binomial name
- Acanalonia clypeata Van Duzee, 1908

= Acanalonia clypeata =

Species of planthopper

Acanalonia clypeata is a species of planthopper in the family Acanaloniidae. It can be found in the Southwestern United States. It can be found feeding on many plants including but not limited to tumbleweed, four-wing saltbush, baccharises, and Prosopis. It is approximately 7 mm long and 3 mm wide.
