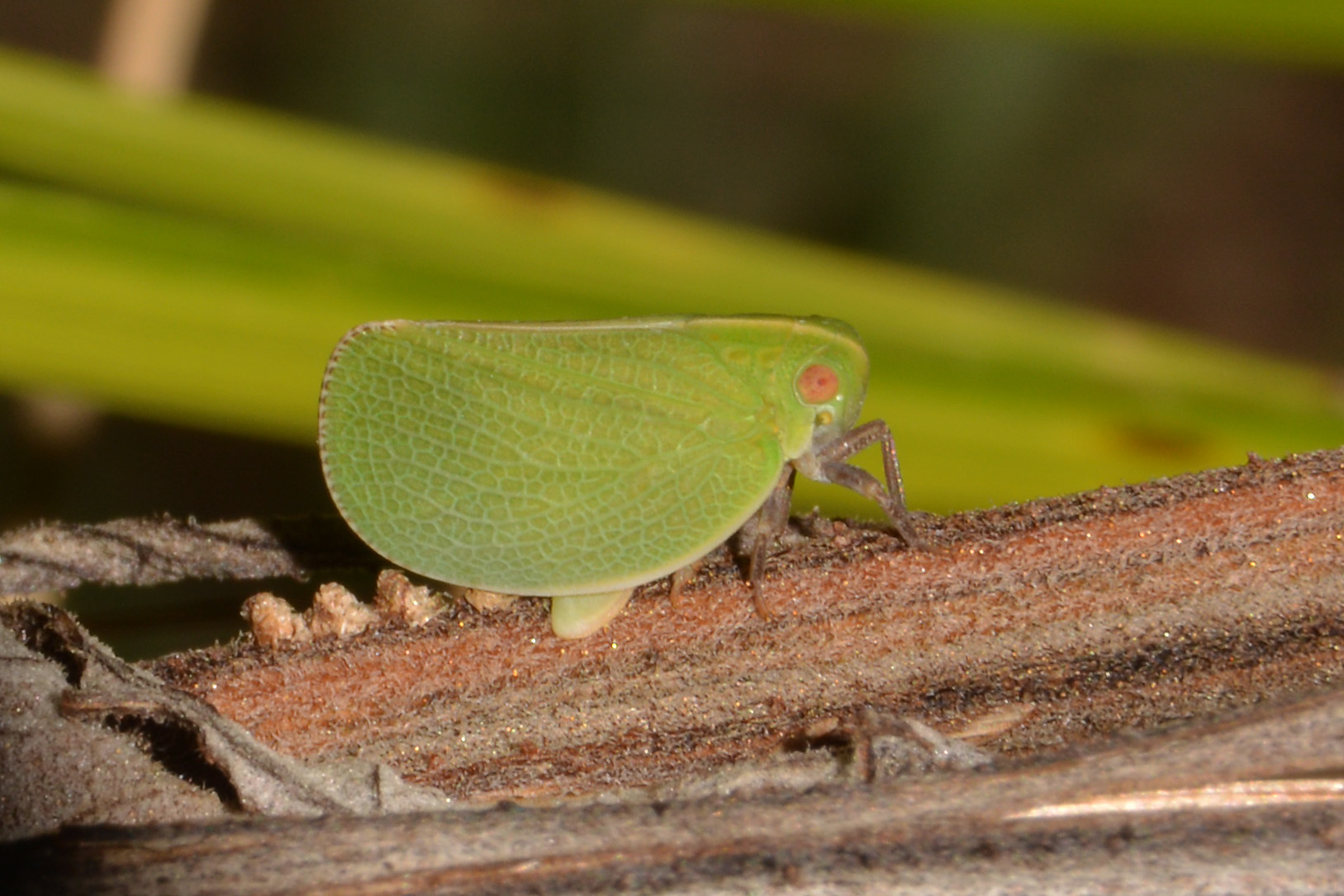

Scientific classification
- Domain: Eukaryota
- Kingdom: Animalia
- Phylum: Arthropoda
- Class: Insecta
- Order: Hemiptera
- Suborder: Auchenorrhyncha
- Infraorder: Fulgoromorpha
- Family: Acanaloniidae
- Genus: Acanalonia
- Species: A. chloris

Binomial name
- Acanalonia chloris (Berg, 1879)

= Acanalonia chloris =

Species of planthopper

Acanalonia chloris is a species of planthopper in the family Acanaloniidae. It can be found in northern Argentina, Chile, and Uruguay.
