= Steriphoma macranthum =

Conservation status
- Data Deficient (IUCN 2.3)

Scientific classification
- Kingdom: Plantae
- Clade: Tracheophytes
- Clade: Angiosperms
- Clade: Eudicots
- Clade: Rosids
- Order: Brassicales
- Family: Capparaceae
- Genus: Steriphoma
- Species: S. macranthum

Binomial name
- Steriphoma macranthum Standl.

Species of flowering plant

Steriphoma macranthum is a species of plant in the Capparaceae family. It is found in Colombia and Panama.
