= Batusa (planthopper) =

Scientific classification
- Domain: Eukaryota
- Kingdom: Animalia
- Phylum: Arthropoda
- Class: Insecta
- Order: Hemiptera
- Suborder: Auchenorrhyncha
- Infraorder: Fulgoromorpha
- Family: Acanaloniidae
- Genus: Batusa; Melichar, 1901

Genus of insects

Batusa is a genus of planthoppers belonging to the family Acanaloniidae. They are found in Mexico, Puerto Rico, and Brazil.

Species:

- Batusa agilis Melichar, 1901
  - Batusa agilis maricensis (Caldwell, 1951)
- Batusa conata Melichar, 1901
- Batusa pinniformis (Fowler, 1900)
- Batusa producta (Stål, 1864) - type species
