= Philatis =

Scientific classification
- Kingdom: Animalia
- Phylum: Arthropoda
- Clade: Pancrustacea
- Class: Insecta
- Order: Hemiptera
- Suborder: Auchenorrhyncha
- Infraorder: Fulgoromorpha
- Family: Acanaloniidae
- Genus: Philatis; Stål, 1862

Type species
- Philatis productus (Stål, 1859)

Genus of insects

Philatis is a genus of planthoppers belonging to the family Acanaloniidae. They can be found in California, Arizona, Mexico, Panama, Peru, and the Galápagos. All species in the genus other than Philatis producta, Philatis signata, and Philatis tuberculata, are native to the Galápagos.

== Species ==
- Philatis athamas Fennah, 1967
- Philatis atrax Fennah, 1967
- Philatis auson Fennah, 1967
- Philatis breviceps Van Duzee, 1933
- Philatis cinerea Osborn, 1924
- Philatis crockeri (Van Duzee, 1937)
- Philatis daunus Fennah, 1967
- Philatis delia Fennah, 1967
- Philatis deucalion Fennah, 1967
- Philatis latobius Fennah, 1967
- Philatis lento Fennah, 1967
- Philatis lycambes Fennah, 1967
- Philatis major Osborn, 1924
- Philatis monaeses Fennah, 1967
- Philatis opheltes Fennah, 1967
- Philatis producta (Stål, 1859) - type species
- Philatis rostrifer (Butler, 1877)
- Philatis servus Van Duzee, 1933
- Philatis signata (Van Duzee, 1923)
- Philatis tuberculata (Van Duzee, 1923)
- Philatis varia (Walker, 1851)
- Philatis vicinus Van Duzee, 1933
