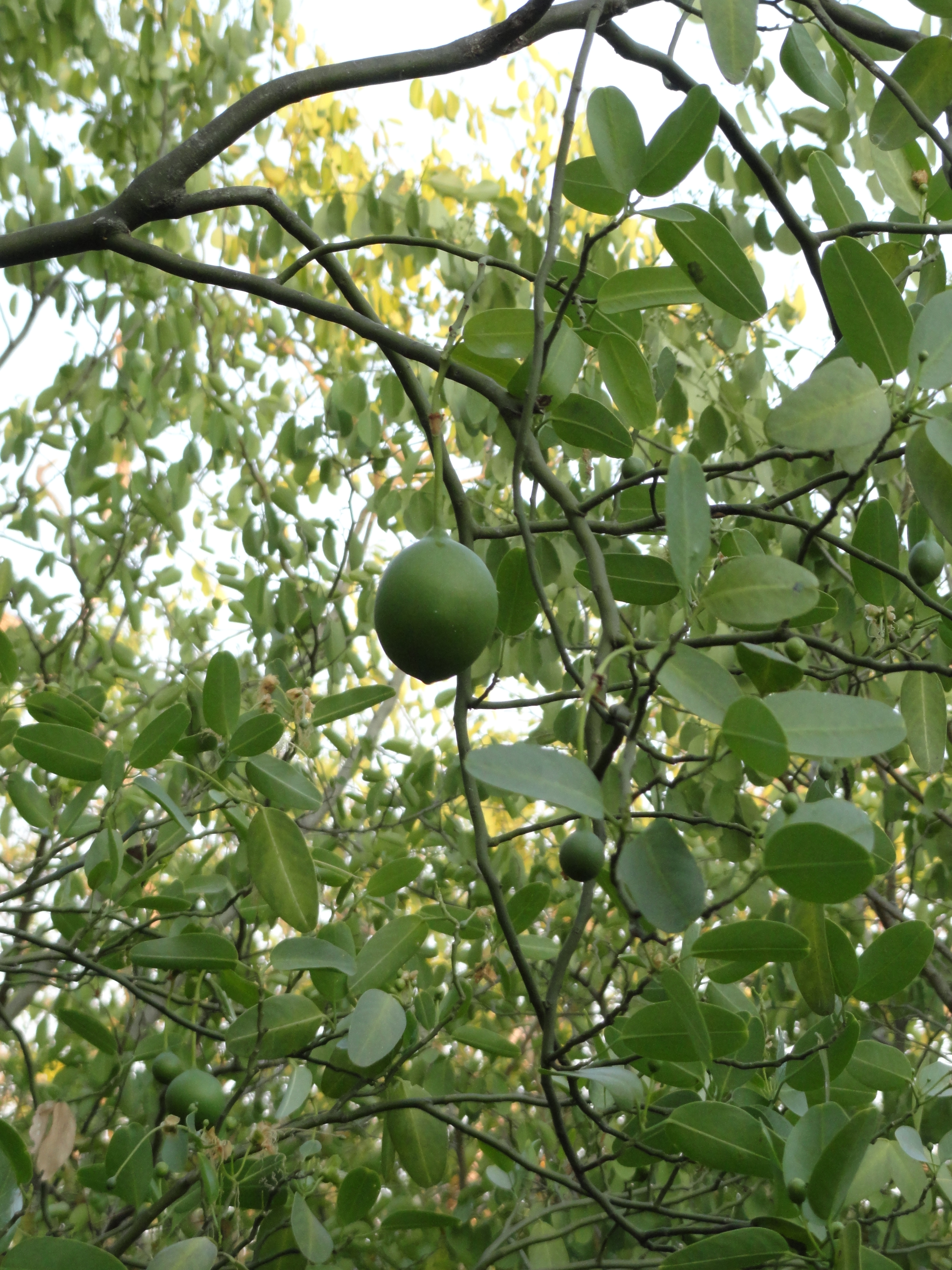
- In Laguna Fortín General Díaz, Paraguay

Conservation status
- Least Concern (IUCN 3.1)

Scientific classification
- Kingdom: Plantae
- Clade: Tracheophytes
- Clade: Angiosperms
- Clade: Eudicots
- Clade: Rosids
- Order: Brassicales
- Family: Capparaceae
- Genus: Morisonia
- Species: M. speciosa

Binomial name
- Morisonia speciosa (Griseb.) Christenh. & Byng

Synonyms
- Anisocapparis speciosa (Griseb.) Cornejo & Iltis; Capparis speciosa Griseb.; Capparis speciosa var. normalis Kuntze; Capparis speciosa var. vera Hassl.; Capparis malmeana Gilg; Capparis pruinosa Griseb.; Capparis speciosa var. lanceolata Kuntze; Capparis speciosa f. malmeana (Gilg) Hassl.; Capparis speciosa var. ovata Kuntze; Capparis speciosa var. pruinosa (Griseb.) Hassl.

= Morisonia speciosa =

Species of fruit and plant

Morisonia speciosa, commonly known as bola verde, is a species of tree in the family Capparaceae. It is native to the Gran Chaco region of Bolivia, Paraguay, western Brazil, and northern Argentina. It was formerly known under the scientific names Anisocapparis speciosa and Capparis speciosa. The fruit, seeds, and flowers of Morisonia speciosa are edible. The fruit is very sweet and has a spicy flavor reminiscent of mangoes. The Toba and Wichí peoples traditionally use it both culinarily and medicinally.

== Taxon and naming ==
Morisonia speciosa was first described in scientific literature by August Grisebach as Capparis speciosa as published in Abhandlungen der Königlichen Gesellschaft der Wissenschaften zu Göttingen in 1879. It was transferred from the genus Capparis to the monotypic genus Anisocapparis following a description by Xavier Cornejo and Hugh Iltis published in a 2008 paper. It was renamed Morisonia speciosa in 2018.

Morisonia speciosa is commonly known as bola verde. Other common names for the species include amarguillo, anquitsuk, ancocha, palo verde, payaguá naranja, sacha limón, and sacha naranja. The fruit is referred to as atsaj by the Wichí and neloma by the Qomle'ec (Toba) and in Pilagá.

== Distribution ==
Morisonia speciosa is native to the Gran Chaco region and can be found in Bolivia, Paraguay, western Brazil, and northern Argentina. It grows in tropical dry broadleaf forests, sometimes co-occurring with carob trees.

== Description ==
Morisonia speciosa is a tree or shrub that is 2–8 metres (6 ft 7 in – 26 ft 3 in) in height. It has a dense crown and foliage, with fine, tortuous branches and smooth, thornless, dark green bark. Its elliptic, green leaves are simple and alternate, ranging from 3–8 centimetres (1.2–3.1 in) in length and 2–4 centimetres (0.79–1.57 in) in width. The margins of the leaves are simple, with a prominent midrib on the underside, and often notched at the tip, with a small mucron or spine.

Morisonia speciosa has flowers with anisosepalous calyces which are distinctively decussate-imbricate. The floral nectaries have four dimorphic scales. The pollen grains have a fine reticulate surface. The yellowish flowers infloresce solitarily, reaching 3–5 centimetres (1.2–2.0 in) in length.

The fruit of Morisonia speciosa are green spherical berries with a shiny exterior. They are 3–5 centimetres (1.2–2.0 in) in diameter and hang from long peduncles. They contain a yellow-orange pulp and four to eight dark, subglobose seeds which are strongly anisocotylary. They have a compact major cotyledon and a reduced or suppressed minor cotyledon.

== Human use ==
The fruit, seeds, and flowers of Morisonia speciosa are edible. The yellowish pulp of the fruit is very sweet and has a spicy flavor reminiscent of mangoes. It is a significant source of dietary fiber, vitamin C and magnesium. The seeds and pulp have naturally occurring antioxidants.

The Toba and Wichí peoples have traditionally used Morisonia speciosa for culinary and medicinal purposes. The fruits are ripe when they fall from the tree. Preservation of the fruit can be done through sun-drying, and underripe fruit may be cooked. Preparation of the seeds involves boiling them and drying them in the sun. They are then crushed and made into flour or a puree that is often combined with oil or fat. The flowers of Morisonia speciosa have a bitter taste that can be removed by boiling.

Traditional medicinal uses for Morisonia speciosa include treatments for toothaches, as an antidysenteric, and against "cold stomach". The bark of Morisonia speciosa is ground and used in folk veterinary medicine for wound healing and as a treatment for skin myiasis. The fruit has been known to be used for fishing bait and the leaves have been used to dye chaguar fibers.

Fruits of the plant are also eaten by gray brockets.
