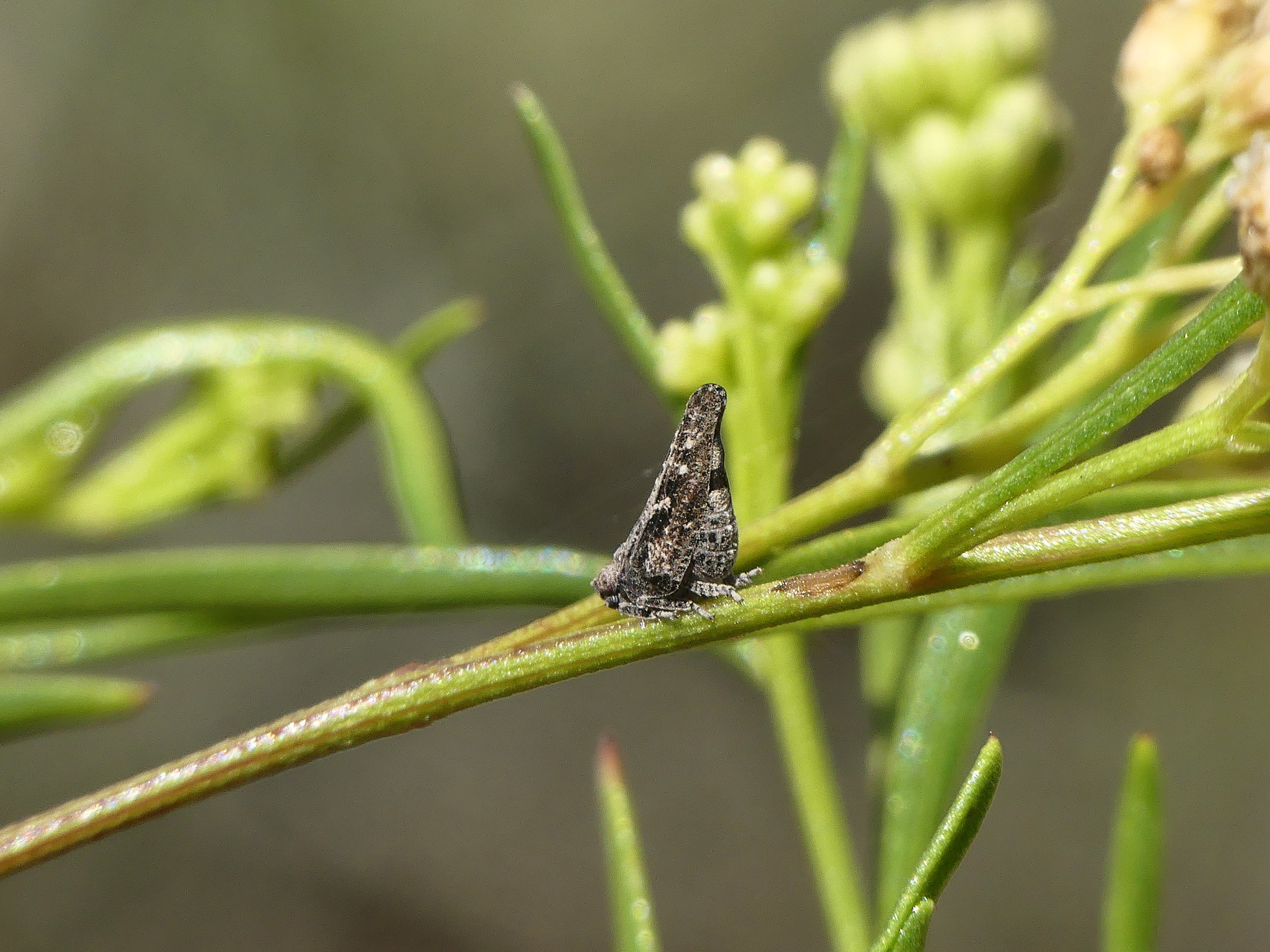

Scientific classification
- Kingdom: Animalia
- Phylum: Arthropoda
- Clade: Pancrustacea
- Class: Insecta
- Order: Hemiptera
- Suborder: Auchenorrhyncha
- Infraorder: Fulgoromorpha
- Family: Acanaloniidae
- Genus: Notosimus; Fennah, 1965
- Species: N. angustipennis

Binomial name
- Notosimus angustipennis Fennah, 1965

= Notosimus =

Genus of insects

Notosimus is a genus of planthopper and contains the single species, Notosimus angustipennis. It is found in northern Argentina. It was initially placed in the family Issidae, however analysis of the ovipositor in female specimens led the genus to be moved to Acanaloniidae in 2012.
