= Steriphoma urbani =

Conservation status
- Endangered (IUCN 3.1)

Scientific classification
- Kingdom: Plantae
- Clade: Tracheophytes
- Clade: Angiosperms
- Clade: Eudicots
- Clade: Rosids
- Order: Brassicales
- Family: Capparaceae
- Genus: Steriphoma
- Species: S. urbani

Binomial name
- Steriphoma urbani Eggers

Species of flowering plant

Steriphoma urbani is a species of plant in the family Capparaceae. It is endemic to Ecuador. It is natural habitat is subtropical or tropical moist lowland forests. It is threatened by habitat loss.
