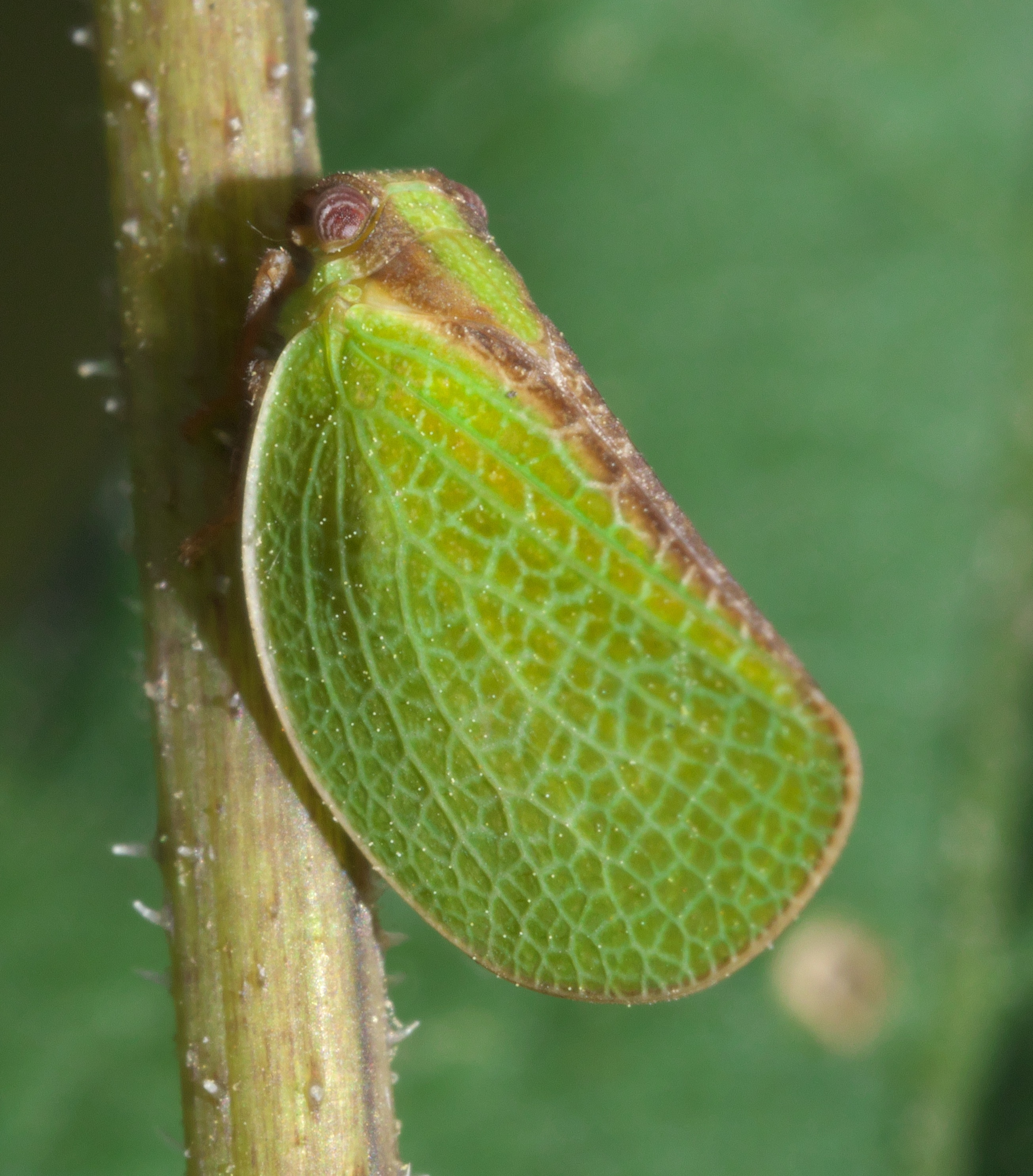
- In Missouri

Scientific classification
- Kingdom: Animalia
- Phylum: Arthropoda
- Clade: Pancrustacea
- Class: Insecta
- Order: Hemiptera
- Suborder: Auchenorrhyncha
- Infraorder: Fulgoromorpha
- Family: Acanaloniidae
- Genus: Acanalonia
- Species: A. bivittata

Binomial name
- Acanalonia bivittata (Say, 1825)

Synonyms
- Flata bivittata Say, 1825 (original combination)

= Acanalonia bivittata =

Species of true bug

Acanalonia bivittata, the two-striped planthopper, is a species of planthopper in the family Acanaloniidae, and the most common and widespread member of the genus Acanalonia. Adults of this species are typically green, though occasionally pink. There is a reddish stripe on the inner edge of the wing.

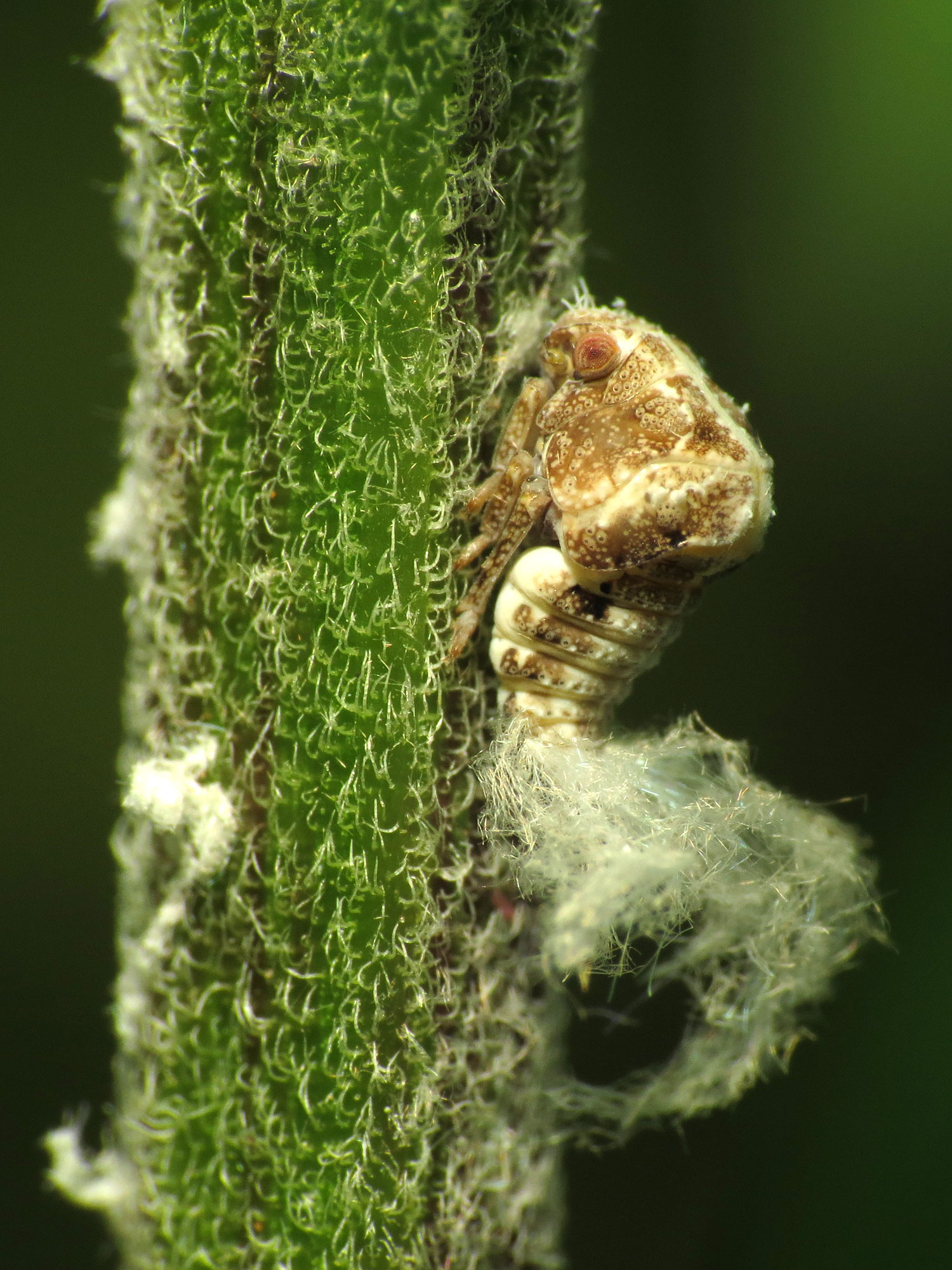
Nymph

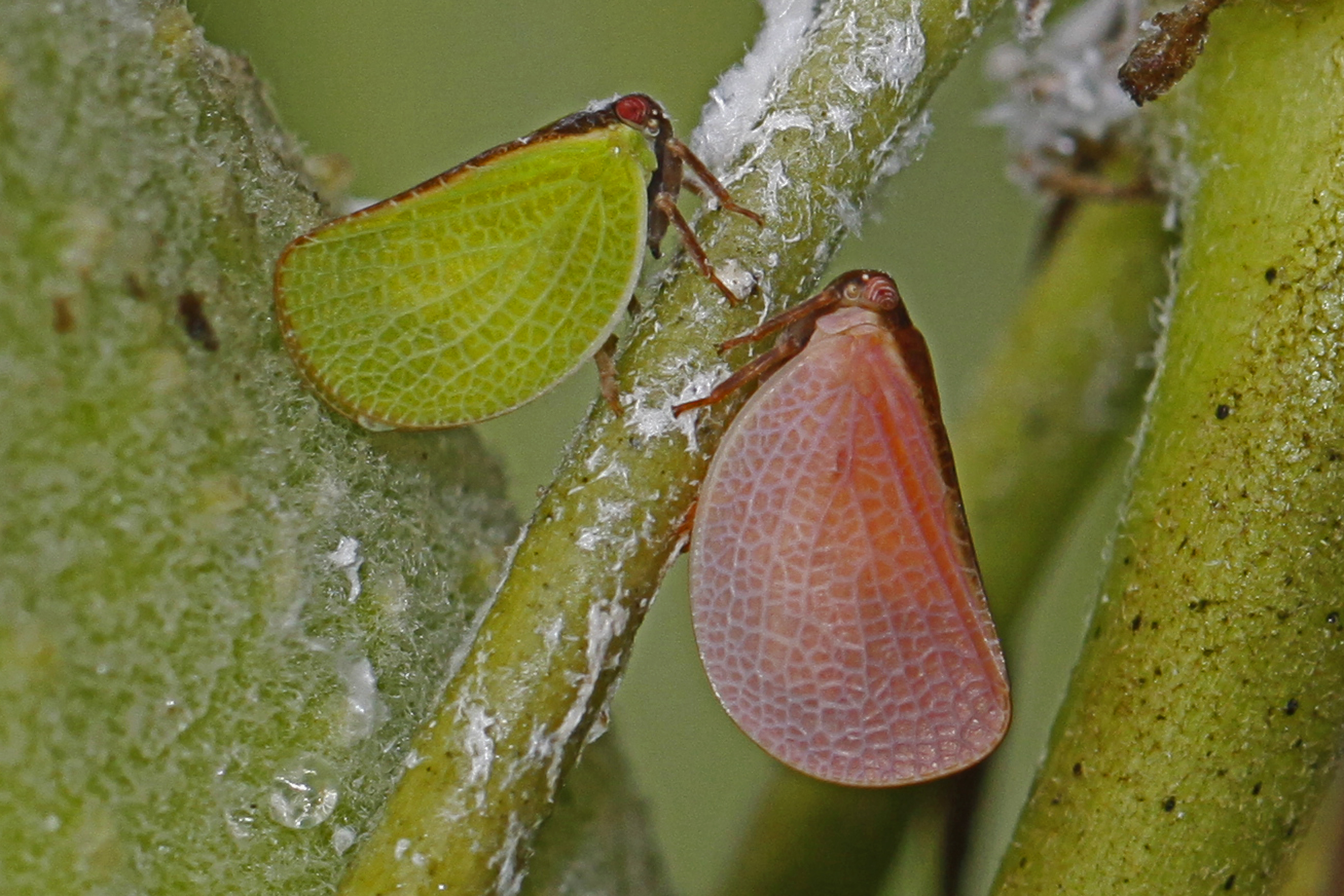
Adults - green and rarer pink form
