= Apteropeoedes =

Scientific classification
- Domain: Eukaryota
- Kingdom: Animalia
- Phylum: Arthropoda
- Class: Insecta
- Order: Orthoptera
- Suborder: Caelifera
- Family: Euschmidtiidae
- Subfamily: Pseudoschmidtiinae
- Tribe: Apteropeoedini
- Genus: Apteropeoedes; Bolivar, 1903

Species
- Apteropeoedes ankarafantsika Descamps, M., 1971; Apteropeoedes betrokae Descamps, M., 1971; Apteropeoedes centralis Descamps, M., 1971; Apteropeoedes dentifer Descamps, M., 1971; Apteropeoedes elegans (Descamps, M., 1964); Apteropeoedes himana Descamps, M., 1973; Apteropeoedes indigoferae (Descamps, M., 1964); Apteropeoedes inermis Descamps, M., 1964; Apteropeoedes marmoratus (Descamps & Wintrebert, 1965); Apteropeoedes monsarrati Descamps, M., 1971; Apteropeoedes nigroplagiatus Bolivar, I., 1903; Apteropeoedes pygmaeus Descamps, M., 1964; Apteropeoedes rostratus Descamps, M., 1971; Apteropeoedes tridens Descamps, M., 1973; Apteropeoedes variabilis Descamps, M., 1971; Apteropeoedes wintreberti (Descamps, M., 1964)

Synonyms
- Chloromastax (Descamps, 1964)

Genus of grasshoppers

Apteropeoedes is a genus of grasshoppers. Species are found in the Indian Ocean islands.
