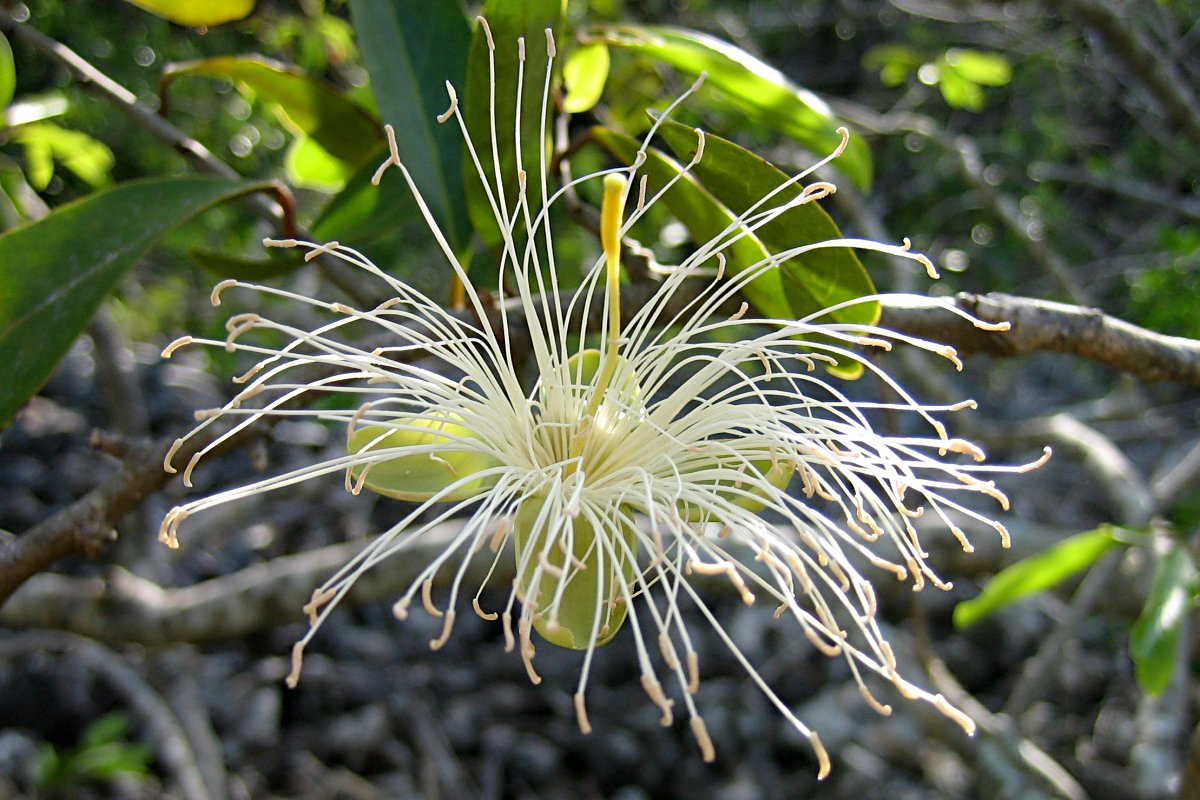
- Morisonia flexuosa flower, Florida Keys

Conservation status
- Least Concern (IUCN 3.1)

Scientific classification
- Kingdom: Plantae
- Clade: Tracheophytes
- Clade: Angiosperms
- Clade: Eudicots
- Clade: Rosids
- Order: Brassicales
- Family: Capparaceae
- Genus: Morisonia
- Species: M. flexuosa

Binomial name
- Morisonia flexuosa L. (1759)

Synonyms
- Capparis brevisiliqua Moc. & Sessé ex DC. (1824); Capparis diversifolia Sessé & Moc. (1894), nom. illeg.; Capparis eucalyptifolia Haught. (1929); Capparis eustachiana Jacq. (1760); Capparis flexuosa (L.) L. (1762); Capparis guayaquilensis Kunth (1821); Capparis laetevirens Mart. (1839); Capparis laevigata Mart. (1839); Capparis lanceolata Ruiz & Pav. ex DC. (1824); Capparis mollis Kunth (1821); Capparis pluvialis Mart. (1839); Capparis saligna Vahl (1794); Capparis sinclairii Benth. (1844); Capparis subbiloba Kunth (1821); Colicodendron subbilobum (Kunth) Seem. (1852); Cynophalla flexuosa (L.) J.Presl (1825); Cynophalla guayaquilensis (Kunth) Iltis (2008); Cynophalla mollis (Kunth) J.Presl (1825); Cynophalla saligna (Vahl) J.Presl (1825); Morisonia guayaquilensis (Kunth) Christenh. & Byng (2018); Uterveria eustachiana (Jacq.) Bertol. (1839)

= Morisonia flexuosa =

Bay-leaved Caper

Species of flowering plant

Morisonia flexuosa, the bay-leaved caper, is a 2–4 meter high shrub.

Morisonia flexuosa flowers from early summer to mid summer. The flowers are white to pink, the thin petals are 1.5 cm long. The fruits are green and cylindrical, up to 15 cm long and contain numerous white seeds which are displayed when the ripe fruits splits open. The pulp is bright pink.

Morisonia flexuosa grows in coastal regions from Florida, the West Indies, Mexico, Central America to South America.

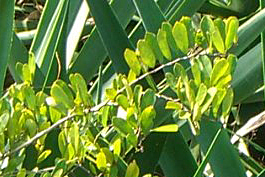
Leaves
