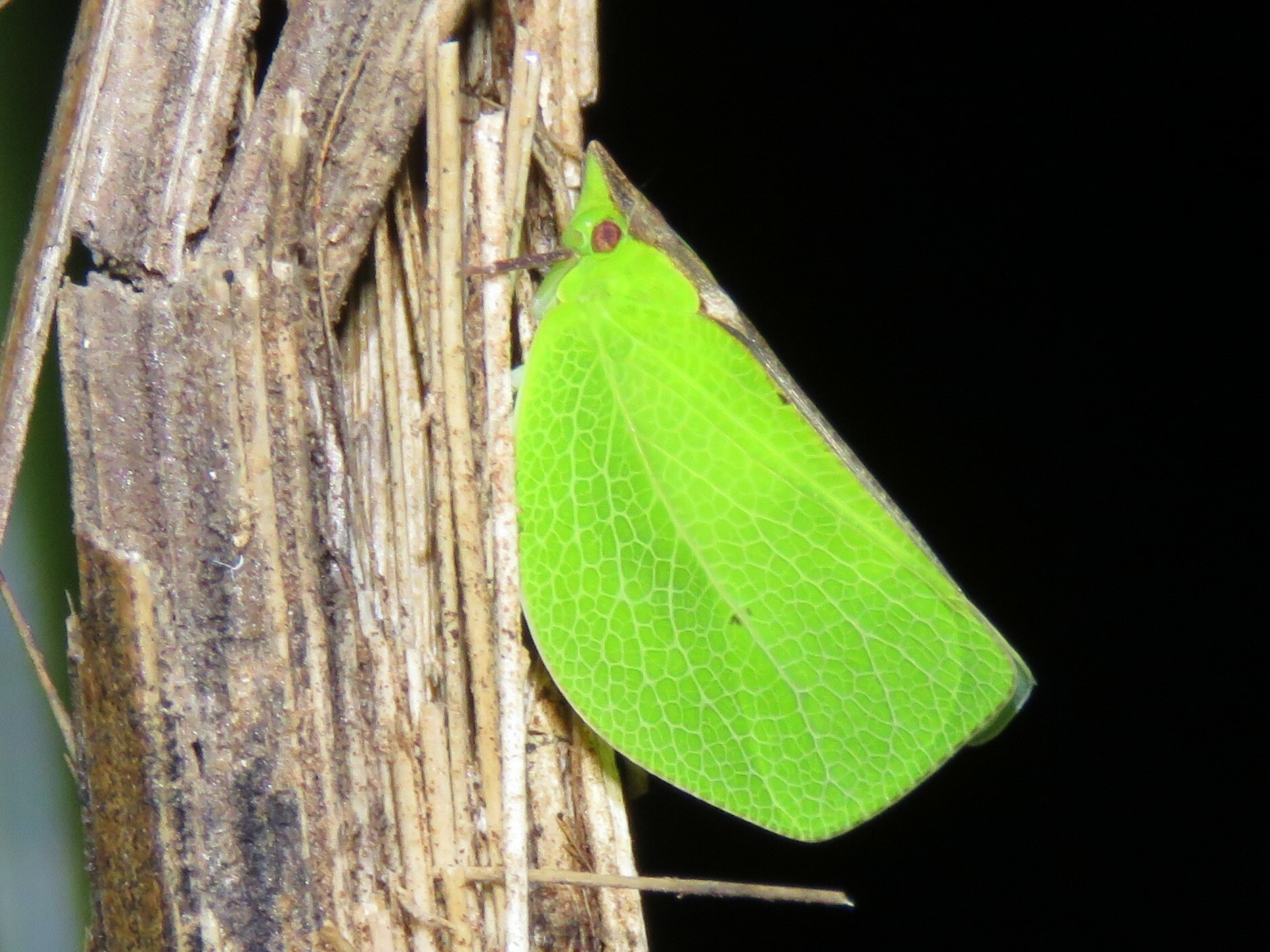
- Chlorochara vivida

Scientific classification
- Kingdom: Animalia
- Phylum: Arthropoda
- Clade: Pancrustacea
- Class: Insecta
- Order: Hemiptera
- Suborder: Auchenorrhyncha
- Infraorder: Fulgoromorpha
- Family: Acanaloniidae
- Genus: Chlorochara; Stål, 1869
- Species: C. vivida

Binomial name
- Chlorochara vivida (Fabricius, 1775)

Subspecies
- Chlorochara vivida vivida (Fabricius, 1775); Chlorochara vivida avivida Caldwell & Martorell, 1951

= Chlorochara =

Genus of insects

Chlorochara is a genus of planthoppers belonging to the family Acanaloniidae and contains one species, Chlorochara vivida, and two subspecies. It can be found in Puerto Rico, Cuba, and Suriname. They are green in color and with their whitish wing veins, they resemble a leaf.
