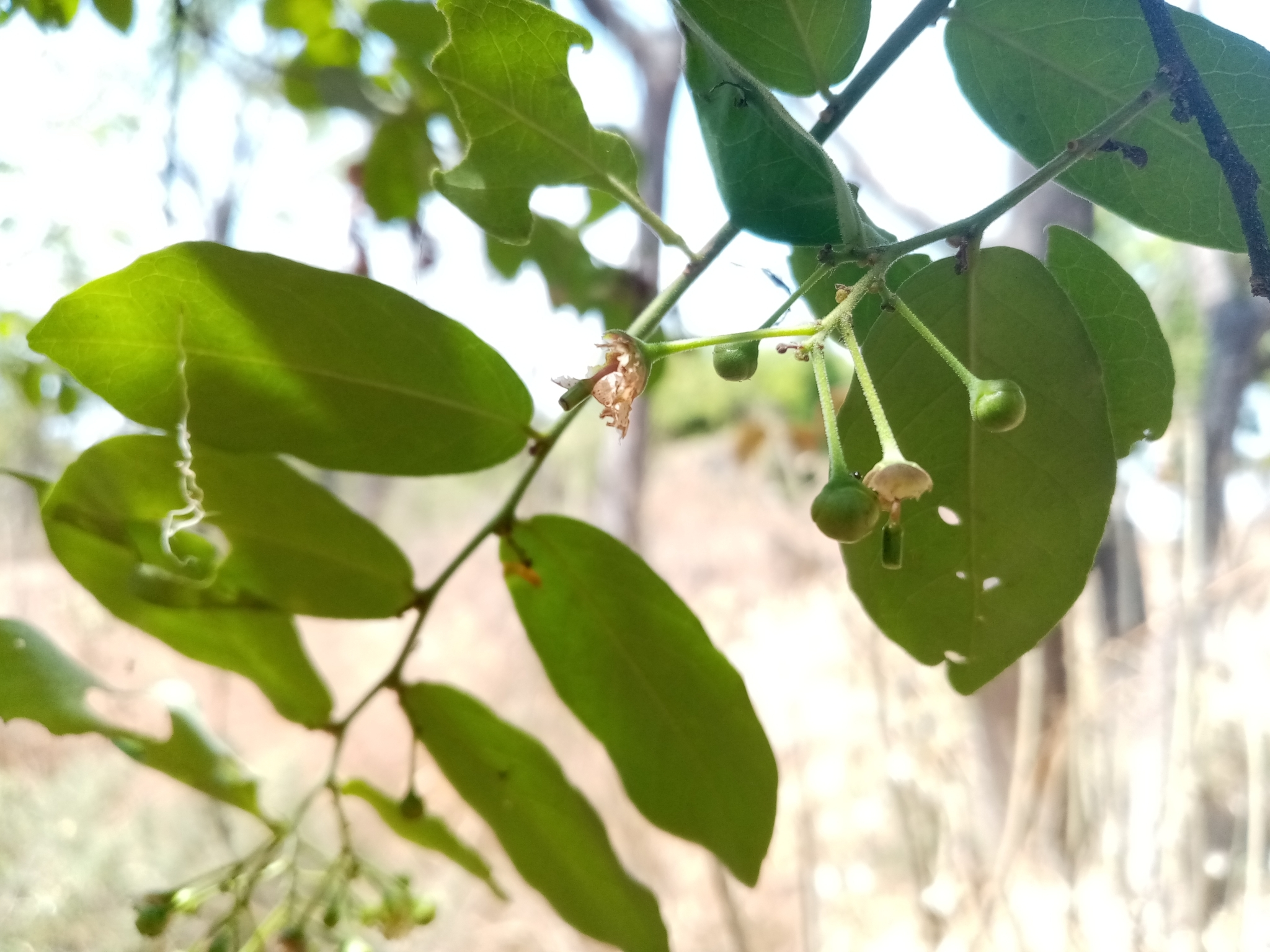

Conservation status
- Endangered (IUCN 3.1)

Scientific classification
- Kingdom: Plantae
- Clade: Tracheophytes
- Clade: Angiosperms
- Clade: Eudicots
- Clade: Rosids
- Order: Brassicales
- Family: Capparaceae
- Genus: Morisonia
- Species: M. heterophylla

Binomial name
- Morisonia heterophylla (Ruiz & Pav. ex DC.) Christenh. & Byng (2018)

Synonyms
- Capparis heterophylla Ruiz & Pav. ex DC. (1824); Cynophalla heterophylla (Ruiz & Pav. ex DC.) Iltis & Cornejo (2008)

= Morisonia heterophylla =

Species of flowering plant

Morisonia heterophylla is a species of flowering plant in the family Capparaceae. It is native to Ecuador and Peru. Its natural habitats are subtropical or tropical dry forests and subtropical or tropical dry shrubland. It is threatened by habitat loss.
