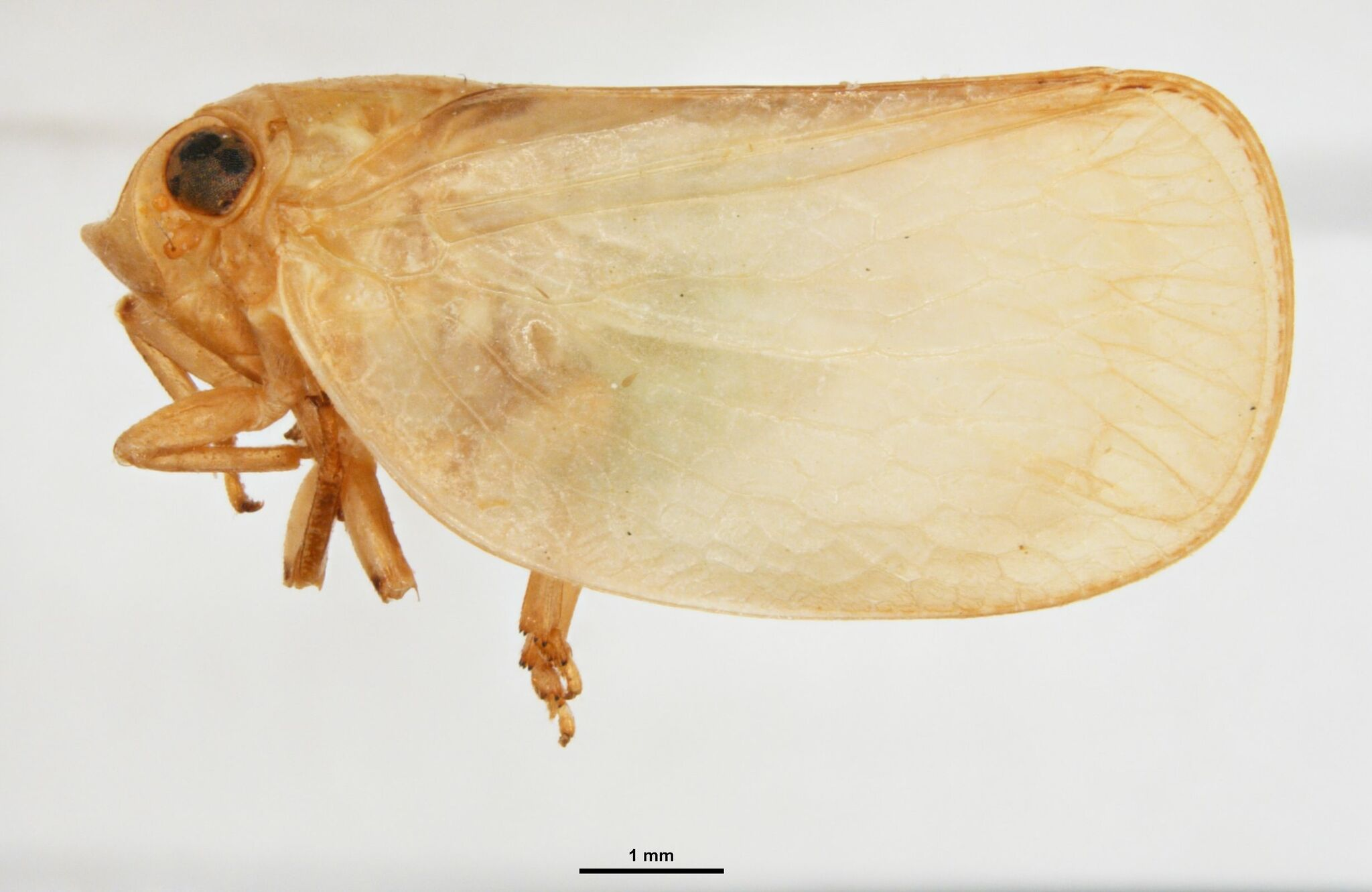
- Bulldolonia depressa

Scientific classification
- Domain: Eukaryota
- Kingdom: Animalia
- Phylum: Arthropoda
- Class: Insecta
- Order: Hemiptera
- Suborder: Auchenorrhyncha
- Infraorder: Fulgoromorpha
- Family: Acanaloniidae
- Genus: Bulldolonia; Gnezdilov, 2012

= Bulldolonia =

Genus of insects

Bulldolonia is a genus of planthoppers belonging to the family Acanaloniidae. It is found in Cuba, Puerto Rico, and the Virgin Islands.

Species:

- Bulldolonia brevifrons (Muir, 1924)
- Bulldolonia depressa (Melichar, 1901) - type species
- Bulldolonia impressa (Metcalf & Bruner, 1930)
