= Aylaella =

Scientific classification
- Domain: Eukaryota
- Kingdom: Animalia
- Phylum: Arthropoda
- Class: Insecta
- Order: Hemiptera
- Suborder: Auchenorrhyncha
- Infraorder: Fulgoromorpha
- Family: Acanaloniidae
- Genus: Aylaella; Demir & Özdikmen, 2009

Genus of insects

Aylaella is a genus of planthoppers belonging to the family Acanaloniidae.

The species of this genus are found in Madagascar.

Species:

- Aylaella reticulata (Lallemand & Synave, 1954)
