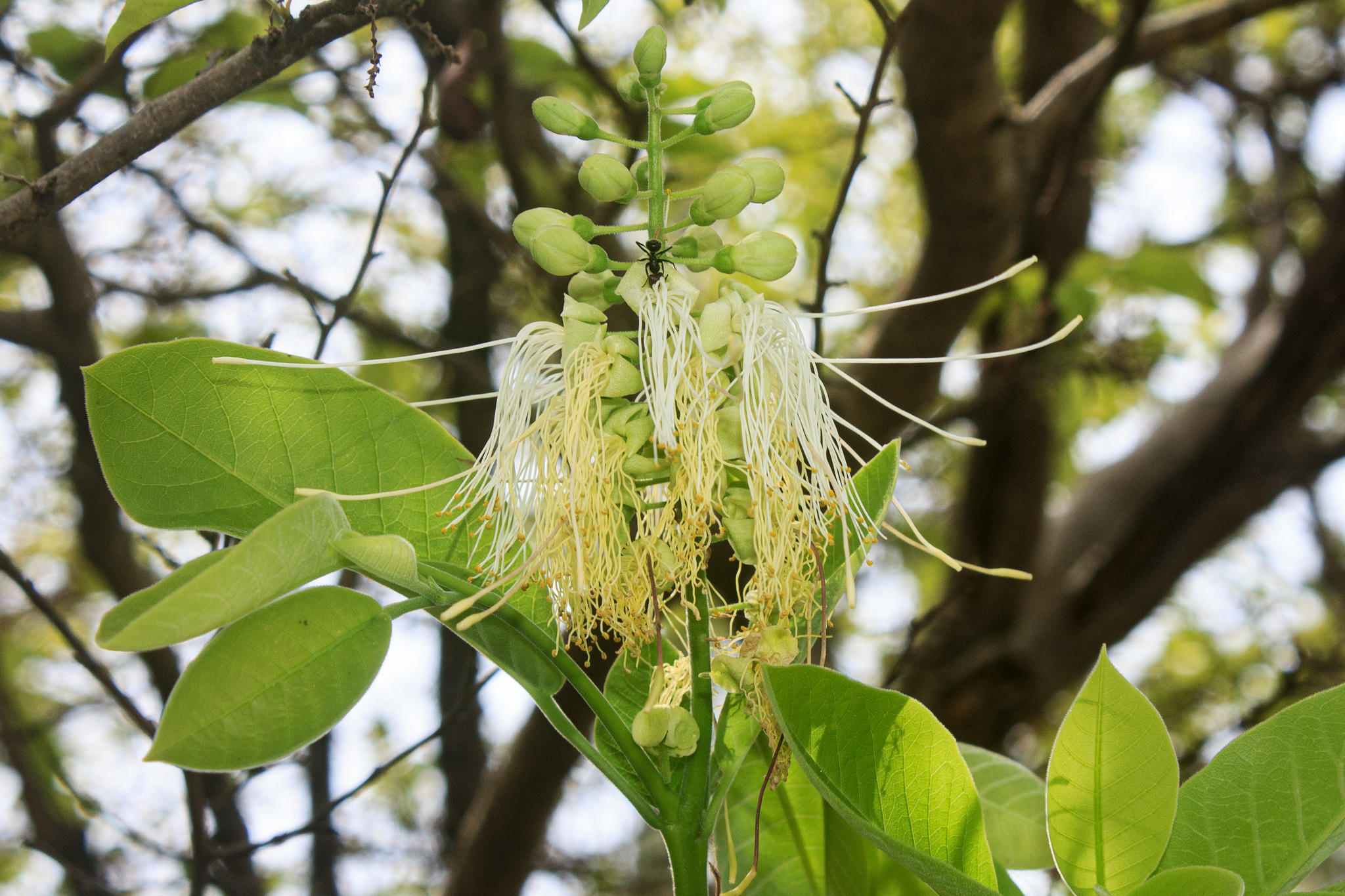
- Morisonia pachaca

Scientific classification
- Kingdom: Plantae
- Clade: Tracheophytes
- Clade: Angiosperms
- Clade: Eudicots
- Clade: Rosids
- Order: Brassicales
- Family: Capparaceae
- Genus: Morisonia; Plum. ex L. (1753)

Species
- See text

Synonyms
- List: Acanthocapparis Cornejo (2020); Anisocapparis Cornejo & Iltis (2008); Atamisquea Miers ex Hook. & Arn. (1833); Belencita H.Karst. (1857); Breynia L. (1753), nom. rej.; Calanthea (DC.) Miers (1864); Caphexandra Iltis & Cornejo (2011); Capparicordis Iltis & Cornejo (2007); Capparidastrum (DC.) Hutch. (1967); Colicodendron Mart. (1839); Cynophalla J.Presl (1825); Hermupoa Loefl. (1758); Hispaniolanthus Cornejo & Iltis (2009); Intutis Raf. (1838); Linnaeobreynia Hutch. (1967); Mesocapparis (Eichler) Cornejo & Iltis (2008); Monilicarpa Cornejo & Iltis (2008); Muco Loefl. (1758), nom. rej.; Neocapparis Cornejo (2017); Octanema Raf. (1838); Pleuteron Raf. (1838); Preslianthus Iltis & Cornejo (2011); Quadrella (DC.) J.Presl (1825); Roemera Tratt. (1802); Sarcotoxicum Cornejo & Iltis (2008); Stephania Willd. (1799), nom. illeg.; Steriphoma Spreng. (1827), nom. cons.; Stuebelia Pax (1887); Uterveria Bertol. (1839)

= Morisonia =

Genus of Capparaceae plants

Morisonia is a genus of flowering plants in the family Capparaceae, found across the Americas from the United States to Argentina. They are typically shrubs or small trees. The genus was recently enlarged with New World Capparis species due to existing taxonomic instability.

== Species ==
Currently accepted species include:

- Morisonia alainiana (Cornejo & Iltis) Christenh. & Byng
- Morisonia americana L.
- Morisonia amplissima (Lam.) Christenh. & Byng
- Morisonia angustifolia (Kunth) Christenh. & Byng
- Morisonia antonensis (Woodson) Christenh. & Byng
- Morisonia asperifolia (C.Presl) Christenh. & Byng
- Morisonia atamisquea (Kuntze) Christenh. & Byng
- Morisonia bahiana (Cornejo & Iltis) Christenh. & Byng
- Morisonia bonifaziana (Cornejo & Iltis) Christenh. & Byng
- Morisonia brasiliana (DC.) Christenh. & Byng
- Morisonia calciphila (Standl. & Steyerm.) Christenh. & Byng
- Morisonia coimbrana (Cornejo & Iltis) Christenh. & Byng
- Morisonia crotonoides (Kunth) Christenh. & Byng
- Morisonia cuatrecasasiana (Dugand) Christenh. & Byng
- Morisonia cynophallophora (L.) Christenh. & Byng
- Morisonia declinata (Vell.) Christenh. & Byng
- Morisonia detonsa (Triana & Planch.) Christenh. & Byng
- Morisonia didymobotrys (Ruiz & Pav. ex DC.) Christenh. & Byng
- Morisonia discolor (Donn.Sm.) Christenh. & Byng
- Morisonia dolichopoda (Helwig) Christenh. & Byng
- Morisonia domingensis (Spreng. ex DC.) Christenh. & Byng
- Morisonia dressleri (Cornejo & Iltis) Christenh. & Byng
- Morisonia ecuadorica (Iltis) Christenh. & Byng
- Morisonia ferruginea (L.) Christenh. & Byng
- Morisonia filipes (Donn.Sm.) Christenh. & Byng
- Morisonia flexuosa L.
- Morisonia frondosa (Jacq.) Christenh. & Byng
- Morisonia grandiflora (Cornejo & Iltis) Christenh. & Byng
- Morisonia hastata (Jacq.) Christenh. & Byng
- Morisonia heterophylla (Ruiz & Pav. ex DC.) Christenh. & Byng
- Morisonia heydeana (Donn.Sm.) Christenh. & Byng
- Morisonia humilis (Hassl.) Christenh. & Byng
- Morisonia incana (Kunth) Christenh. & Byng
- Morisonia indica (L.) ined.
- Morisonia isthmensis (Eichler) Christenh. & Byng
- Morisonia lindeniana (Cornejo & Iltis) Christenh. & Byng
- Morisonia linearis (Jacq.) Christenh. & Byng
- Morisonia lineata (Dombey ex Pers.) Christenh. & Byng
- Morisonia longifolia (Mart.) Christenh. & Byng
- Morisonia lundellii (Standl.) Christenh. & Byng
- Morisonia macrantha (Standl.) Christenh. & Byng
- Morisonia macrophylla (Kunth) Christenh. & Byng
- Morisonia martiana (Cornejo) Christenh. & Byng
- Morisonia matogrossensis (Pilg.) Christenh. & Byng
- Morisonia megalosperma (Cornejo & Iltis) Christenh. & Byng
- Morisonia mirifica (Standl.) Christenh. & Byng
- Morisonia mollicella (Standl.) Christenh. & Byng
- Morisonia morenoi (Cornejo & Iltis) Christenh. & Byng
- Morisonia multiflora Triana & Planch.
- Morisonia nemorosa (Jacq.) Christenh. & Byng
- Morisonia oblongifolia Britton
- Morisonia odoratissmia (Jacq.) Christenh. & Byng
- Morisonia osmantha (Diels) Christenh. & Byng
- Morisonia pachaca (Kunth) Christenh. & Byng
- Morisonia panamensis (Iltis) Christenh. & Byng
- Morisonia paradoxa (Jacq.) Christenh. & Byng
- Morisonia peruviana (Spruce ex Eichler) Christenh. & Byng
- Morisonia petiolaris (Kunth) Christenh. & Byng
- Morisonia pittieri (Standl.) Christenh. & Byng
- Morisonia polyantha (Triana & Planch.) Christenh. & Byng
- Morisonia pringlei (Briq.) Christenh. & Byng
- Morisonia pulcherrima (Jacq.) Christenh. & Byng
- Morisonia quina (J.F.Macbr.) Christenh. & Byng
- Morisonia quintanarooensis (Iltis & Cornejo) Christenh. & Byng
- Morisonia quiriguensis (Standl.) Christenh. & Byng
- Morisonia retusa (Griseb.) Christenh. & Byng
- Morisonia salicifolia (Griseb.) Christenh. & Byng
- Morisonia scabrida (Kunth) Christenh. & Byng
- Morisonia sclerophylla (Iltis & Cornejo) Christenh. & Byng
- Morisonia sessilis (Banks ex DC.) Christenh. & Byng
- Morisonia singularis (R.Rankin) Christenh. & Byng
- Morisonia sola (J.F.Macbr.) Christenh. & Byng
- Morisonia speciosa (Griseb.) Christenh. & Byng
- Morisonia sprucei (Eichler) Christenh. & Byng
- Morisonia stenopetala (Urb.) Christenh. & Byng
- Morisonia steyermarkii (Standl.) Christenh. & Byng
- Morisonia tafallana (Cornejo, Iltis & Cerón) Christenh. & Byng
- Morisonia tarapotensis (Eichler) Christenh. & Byng
- Morisonia tenuisiliqua (Jacq.) Christenh. & Byng
- Morisonia tuxtlensis (Cornejo & Iltis) Christenh. & Byng
- Morisonia tweedieana (Eichler) Christenh. & Byng
- Morisonia urbani (Eggers) Christenh. & Byng
- Morisonia valerabella (Iltis, T.Ruíz & G.S.Bunting) Christenh. & Byng
- Morisonia verrucosa (Jacq.) Christenh. & Byng
- Morisonia yco (Mart.) Christenh. & Byng
- Morisonia yunckeri (Standl.) Christenh. & Byng
