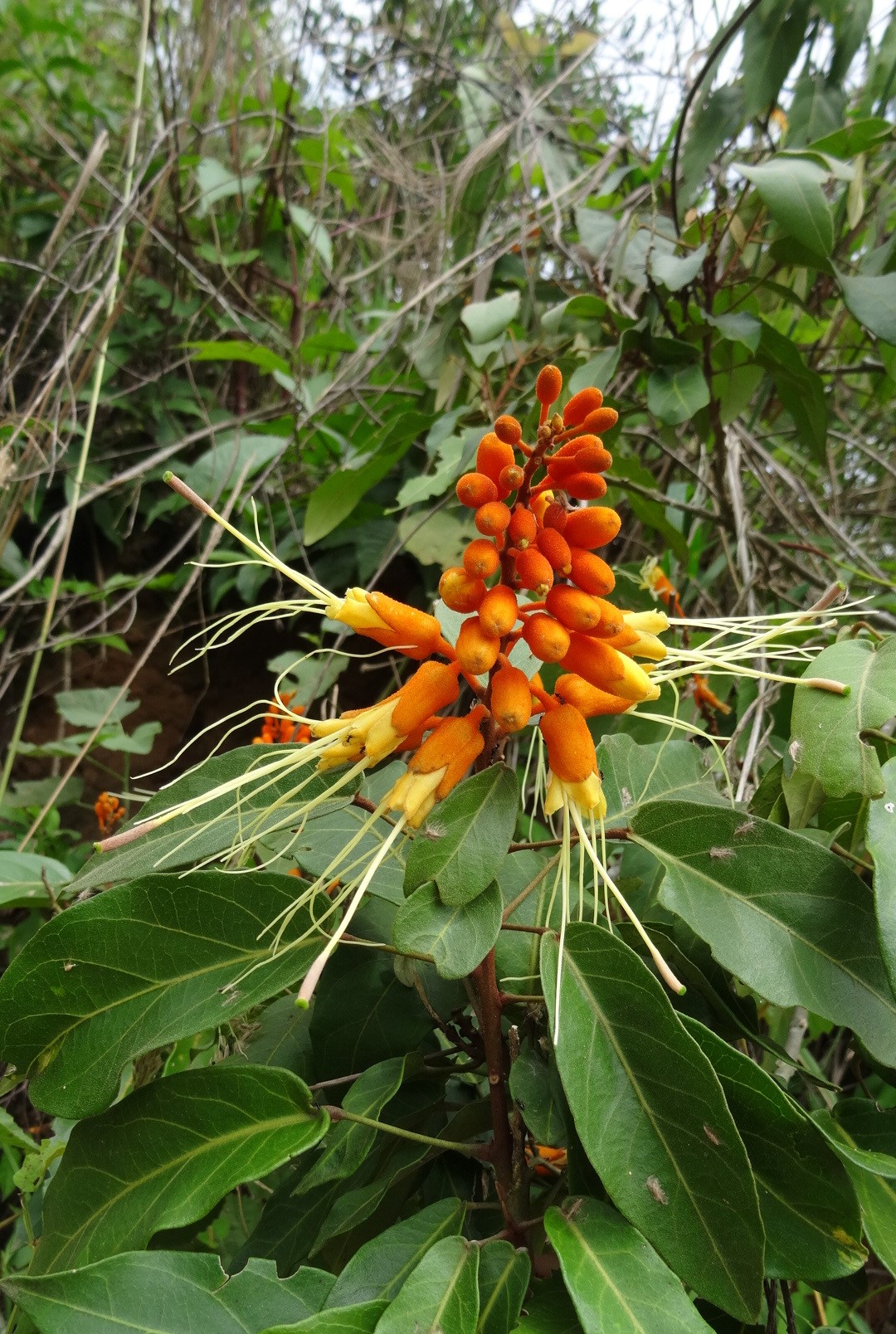

Scientific classification
- Kingdom: Plantae
- Clade: Tracheophytes
- Clade: Angiosperms
- Clade: Eudicots
- Clade: Rosids
- Order: Brassicales
- Family: Capparaceae
- Genus: Morisonia
- Species: M. peruviana

Binomial name
- Morisonia peruviana (Spruce ex Eichler) Christenh. & Byng

Synonyms
- Steriphoma peruvianum Spruce ex Eichler

= Morisonia peruviana =

Species of flowering plant

Morisonia peruviana is a species of flowering plant in the family Capparaceae. It is native to Peru.
