= Marius Descamps =

French entomologist (1924–1996)

- Born: June 16, 1924
- Died: February 20, 1996 (aged 71)
- Citizenship: French
- Scientific career
- Fields: Entomology
- Institutions: Museum National d'Histoire Naturelle, Paris

Marius Descamps (16 June 1924 – 20 February 1996) was a French entomologist, specialist of orthoptera at the Museum National d'Histoire Naturelle in Paris.

== Works ==
Published Recherches morphologiques et biologiques sur les Diopsidae du Nord Cameroun.
