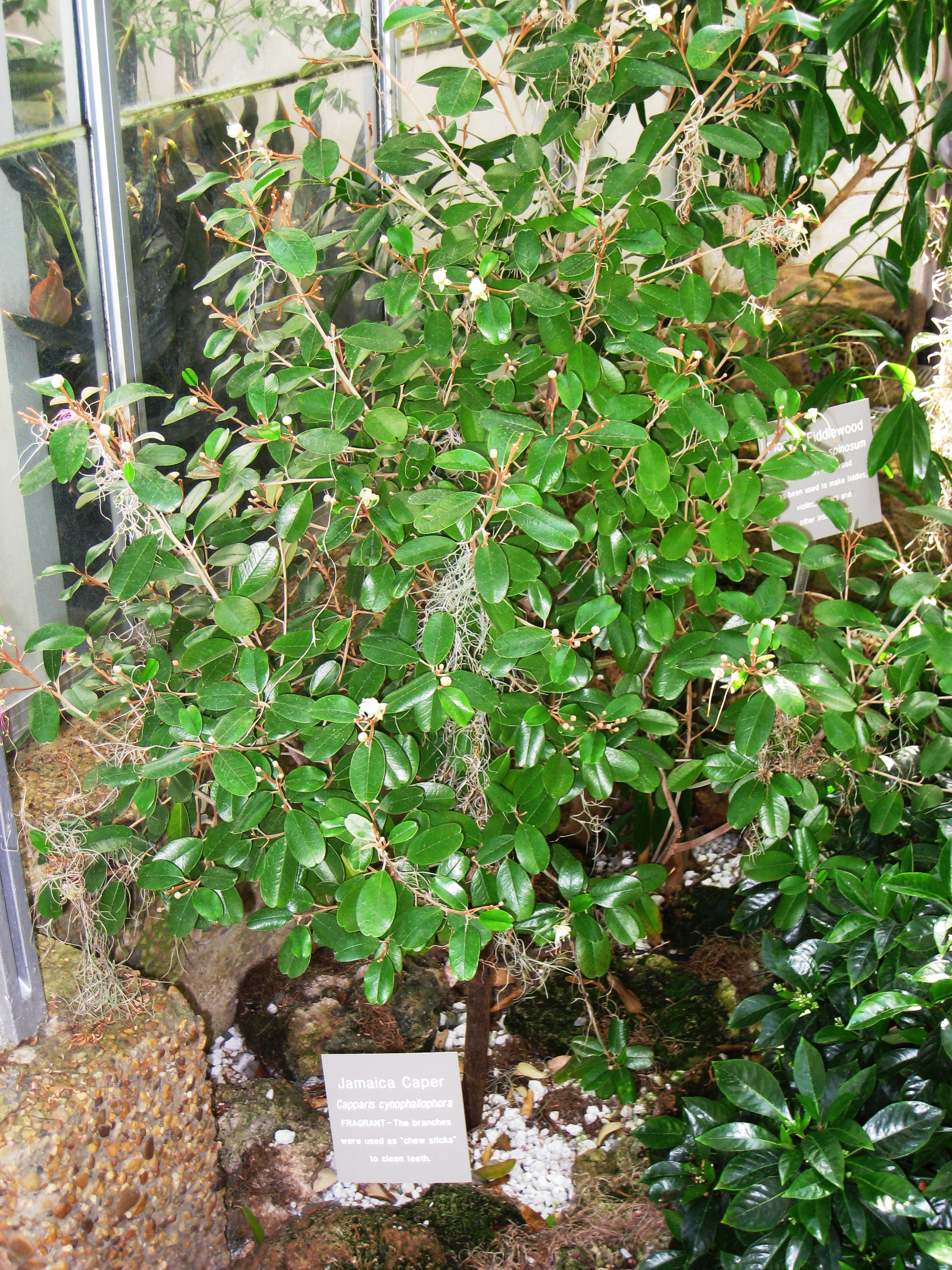

Conservation status
- Secure (NatureServe)

Scientific classification
- Kingdom: Plantae
- Clade: Tracheophytes
- Clade: Angiosperms
- Clade: Eudicots
- Clade: Rosids
- Order: Brassicales
- Family: Capparaceae
- Genus: Morisonia
- Species: M. cynophallophora

Binomial name
- Morisonia cynophallophora L. Christenh. & Byng (2018)

Synonyms
- Synonymy: Capparis cynophallophora L. (1753); Capparis emarginata A.Rich. (1841), nom. illeg.; Capparis gonaivensis Helwig (1929); Capparis jamaicensis Jacq. (1760); Capparis longifolia Sw. (1788); Capparis obtusa Raf. (1838); Capparis pauciflora Kunth (1821); Capparis siliquosa L. (1759); Capparis torulosa Sw. (1788); Capparis uncinata Lodd. ex Eichl. (1865); Capparis verticillaris Turcz. (1863); Colicodendron anceps Shuttlew. ex Chapm. (1860); Cynophalla pauciflora (Kunth) J.Presl (1825); Morisonia gonaivensis (Helwig) Christenh. & Byng (2018); Morisonia jamaicensis (Jacq.) Christenh. & Byng (2018); Morisonia siliquosa (L.) Christenh. & Byng (2018); Pleuteron hastata Raf. (1838); Pleuteron siliquosa (L.) Raf. (1838); Pleuteron torulosa (Sw.) Raf. (1838); Quadrella cynophallophora (L.) Hutch. (1967); Quadrella gonaivensis (Helwig) Hutch. (1967); Quadrella jamaicensis (Jacq.) J.Presl (1825); Quadrella jamaicensis f. longifolia (Sw.) Iltis (2010); Quadrella siliquosa (L.) Iltis & Cornejo (2010); Quadrella torulosa (Sw.) J.Presl (1838); Uterveria cynophallophora (L.) Bertol. (1839)

= Morisonia cynophallophora =

Jamaican caper

Species of tree

Morisonia cynophallophora (synonym Capparis cynophallophora), commonly known as the Jamaican caper, is small tree in the caper family, Capparaceae, that is native to the Neotropical realm.

== Description ==
The brand new leaves at the apical tips of twigs are folded in half showing only the whitish, hairy abaxial (lower or ventral) side of the leaf. The adaxial (upper or dorsal) side of the leaf is glossy and darker. Fruits are long and split to release several large, brown seeds.

== Habitat and range ==
The native range of M. cyanophallophora includes the United States (Florida), Mexico, the Caribbean, Central America, and South America as far south as northern Argentina. It inhabits mangrove forests, hammocks and shellmounds in coastal Florida and is extremely drought resistant

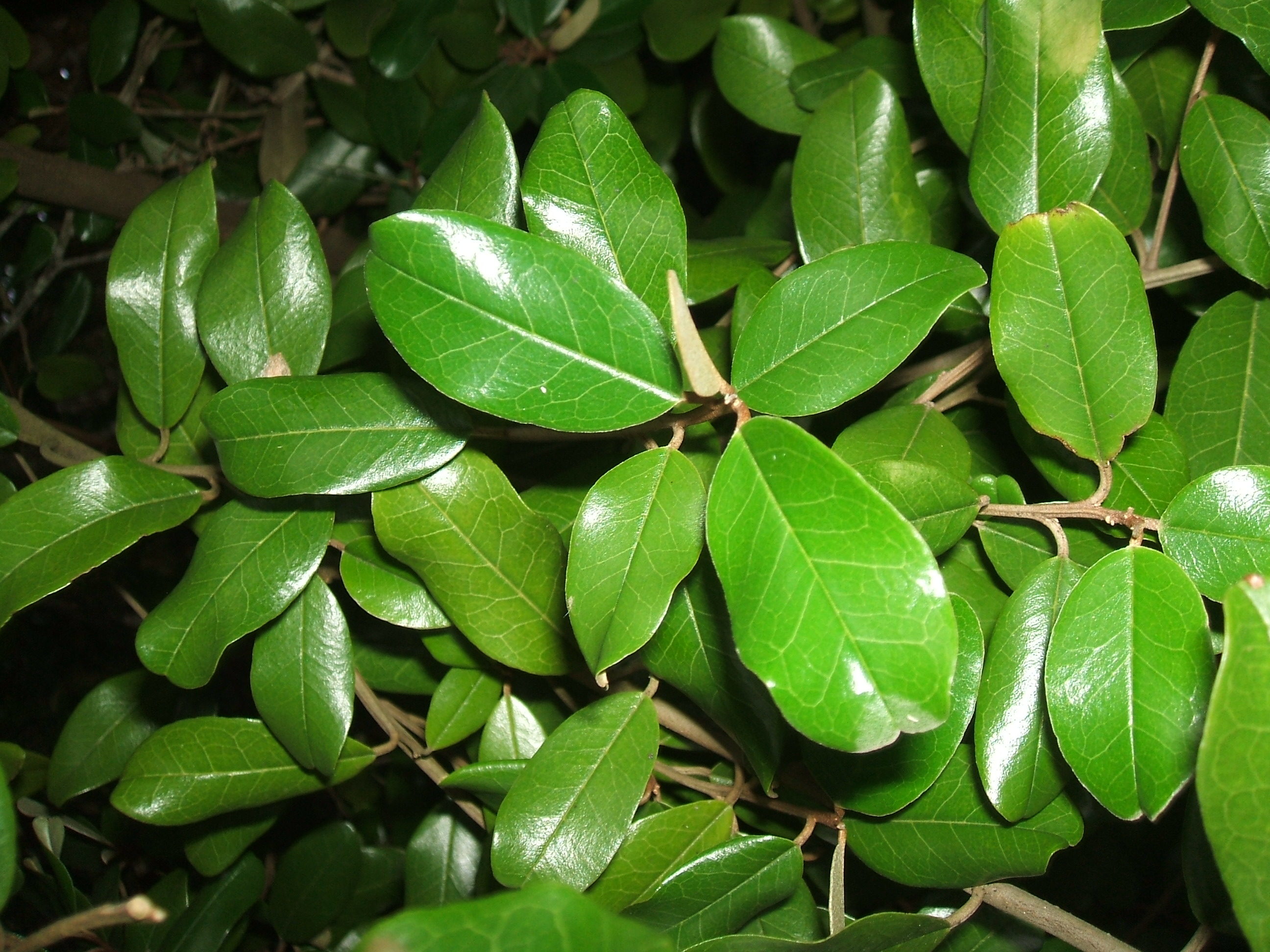
Detail of apical twig showing young leaf folded to reveal the hairy lower surface

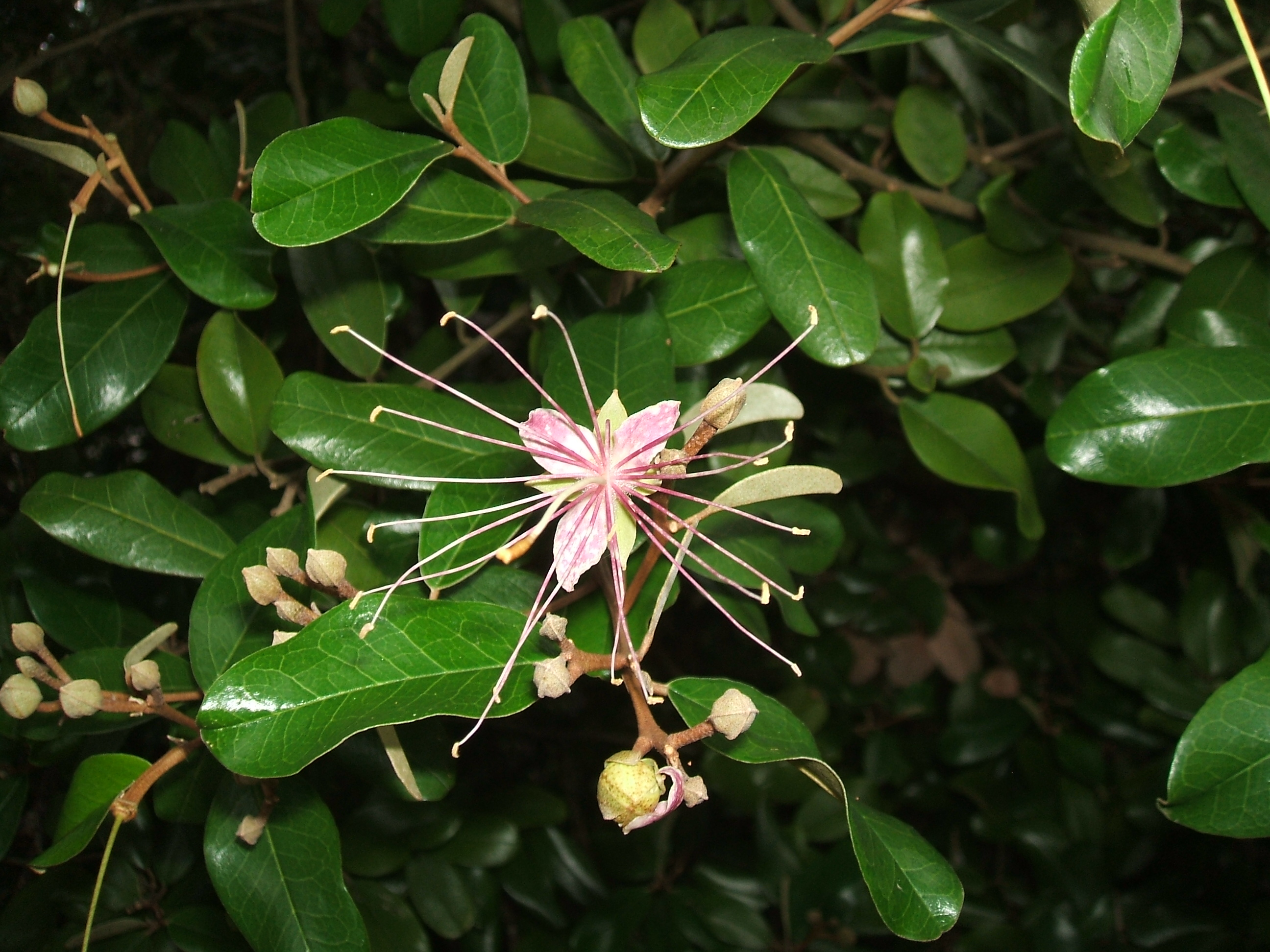
Flower and flower buds
