= Descampsiella =

Scientific classification
- Domain: Eukaryota
- Kingdom: Animalia
- Phylum: Arthropoda
- Class: Insecta
- Order: Orthoptera
- Suborder: Caelifera
- Family: Euschmidtiidae
- Genus: Descampsiella; Özdikmen, 2008

Synonyms
- Perinetella Descamps & Wintrebert, 1965; Perinetia Descamps, 1964

Genus of insects

Descampsiella is a genus of grasshoppers belonging to the family Euschmidtiidae.

Species:

- Descampsiella annulipes (Descamps, 1964)
