= Euschmidtiidae =

Scientific classification
- Kingdom: Animalia
- Phylum: Arthropoda
- Clade: Pancrustacea
- Class: Insecta
- Order: Orthoptera
- Suborder: Caelifera
- Superfamily: Eumastacoidea
- Family: Euschmidtiidae; Rehn, 1948

Family of grasshoppers

Euschmidtiidae is a family of grasshoppers in the order Orthoptera. There are at least 60 genera and more than 240 described species in Euschmidtiidae, found in Sub-Saharan Africa and surrounding islands.

== Genera ==
These 60 genera belong to the family Euschmidtiidae:

- Acanthomastax Descamps, 1964
- Acridomastax Descamps, 1971
- Amalomastax Rehn & Rehn, 1945
- Amatonga Rehn & Rehn, 1945
- Ambatomastax Descamps & Wintrebert, 1965
- Apteropeoedes Bolívar, 1903
- Apteroschmidtia Descamps, 1973
- Caenoschmidtia Descamps, 1973
- Carcinomastax Rehn & Rehn, 1945
- Chromomastax Descamps, 1964
- Cryptomastax Descamps, 1971
- Dactulomastax Descamps, 1971
- Dendromastax Descamps & Wintrebert, 1965
- Descampsiella Özdikmen, 2008
- Dichromastax Descamps, 1971
- Elutronuxia Descamps, 1964
- Eudirshia Roy, 1961
- Euschmidtia Karsch, 1889
- Exophtalmomastax Descamps, 1964
- Harpemastax Descamps, 1964
- Isalomastax Descamps & Wintrebert, 1965
- Kratopodia Descamps, 1964
- Kwalea Descamps, 1973
- Lavanonia Descamps, 1964
- Lobomastax Descamps, 1964
- Loboschmidtia Descamps, 1973
- Macromastax Karsch, 1889
- Malagamastax Descamps, 1964
- Maroantsetraia Descamps, 1964
- Mastachopardia Descamps, 1964
- Mastaleptea Descamps, 1971
- Microlobia Descamps, 1964
- Micromastax Descamps, 1964
- Microschmidtia Descamps, 1973
- Namontia Descamps, 1964
- Paraschmidtia Descamps, 1964
- Parasymbellia Descamps, 1964
- Parawintrebertia Descamps & Wintrebert, 1965
- Pauromastax Descamps, 1974
- Penichrotes Karsch, 1889
- Peoedes Karsch, 1889
- Platymastax Descamps, 1964
- Pseudamatonga Descamps, 1971
- Pseudoschmidtia Rehn & Rehn, 1945
- Raphimastax Descamps, 1971
- Rhinomastax Descamps, 1971
- Sauromastax Descamps, 1964
- Scleromastax Descamps, 1971
- Sphaerophallus Descamps, 1964
- Symbellia Burr, 1899
- Tapiamastax Descamps & Wintrebert, 1965
- Teratomastax Descamps, 1964
- Tetefortina Descamps, 1964
- Trichoschmidtia Descamps, 1974
- Wintrebertella Descamps, 1964
- Wintrebertia Descamps, 1964
- Wintrebertina Descamps, 1971
- Xenomastax Descamps, 1964
- Xenoschmidtia Descamps, 1973
- † Stenoschmidtia Descamps, 1973
