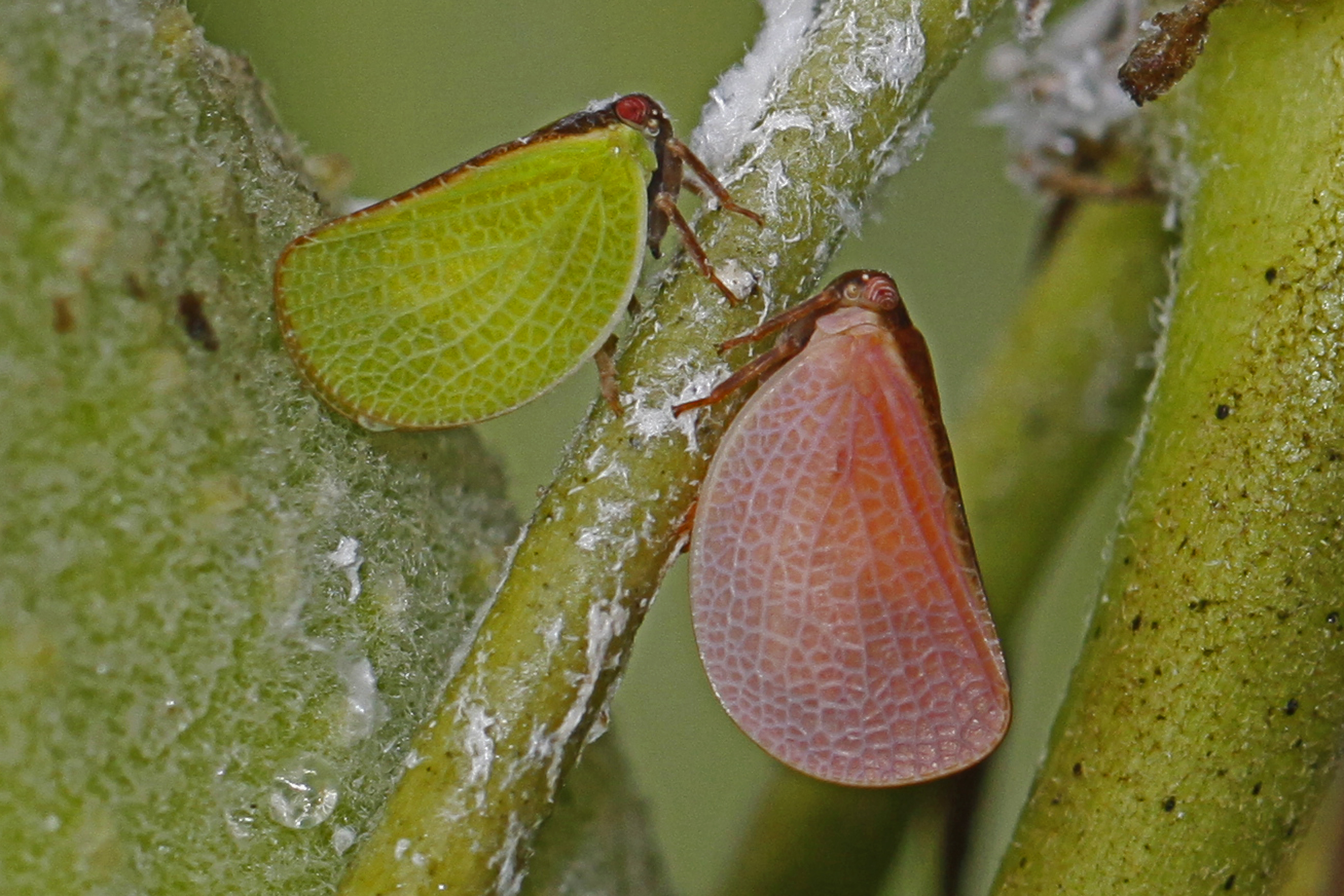

Scientific classification
- Kingdom: Animalia
- Phylum: Arthropoda
- Class: Insecta
- Order: Hemiptera
- Suborder: Auchenorrhyncha
- Infraorder: Fulgoromorpha
- Superfamily: Fulgoroidea
- Family: Acanaloniidae; Amyot & Serville 1843

= Acanaloniidae =

Family of true bugs

Acanaloniidae is a family of planthoppers. It is sometimes treated as a subfamily of Issidae (as Acanaloniinae).

== Genera ==
Genera include:

- Acanalonia Spinola, 1839
- Aylaella Demir & Özdikmen, 2009
- Batusa Melichar, 1901
- Bulldolonia Gnezdilov, 2012
- Chlorochara Stål, 1869
- Notosimus Fennah, 1965
- Philatis Stål, 1862
