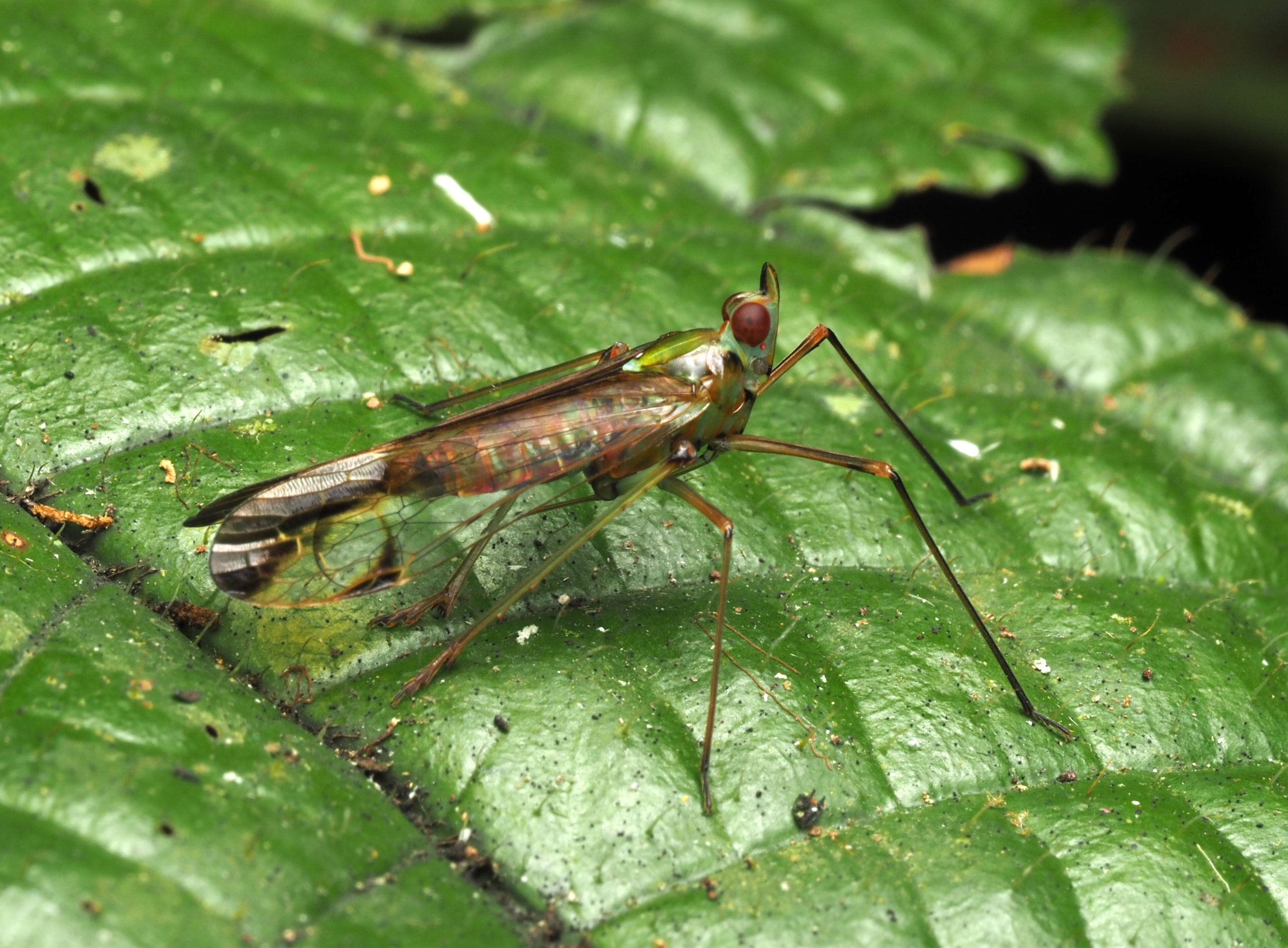
- From Wayanad

Scientific classification
- Kingdom: Animalia
- Phylum: Arthropoda
- Clade: Pancrustacea
- Class: Insecta
- Order: Hemiptera
- Suborder: Auchenorrhyncha
- Infraorder: Fulgoromorpha
- Family: Dictyopharidae
- Subfamily: Dictyopharinae
- Tribe: Orthopagini
- Genus: Indomiasa; Song, Webb & Liang, 2014
- Species: I. distanti

Binomial name
- Indomiasa distanti Song, Webb & Liang, 2014

= Indomiasa =

Genus of insects

Indomiasa distanti is the sole species of dictyopharid planthopper in the genus Indomiasa described from southern India in 2014. It is related to the genus Miasa of Southeast Asia and belongs to the tribe Orthopagini but it has a distinctly shorter and rounded cephalic process. The holotype was collected in Tenmalai, south of the Palghat gap, in 1938. The hind tibiae have 7 apical teeth, the hind tarsomeres have black tipped apical teeth, 16 to 17 in the first segment and 13 to 14 in the second segment. Centromeria has a similar cephalic process but the forewing is more slender and elongate in Indomiasa.

The species name honours the British entomologist W. L. Distant.

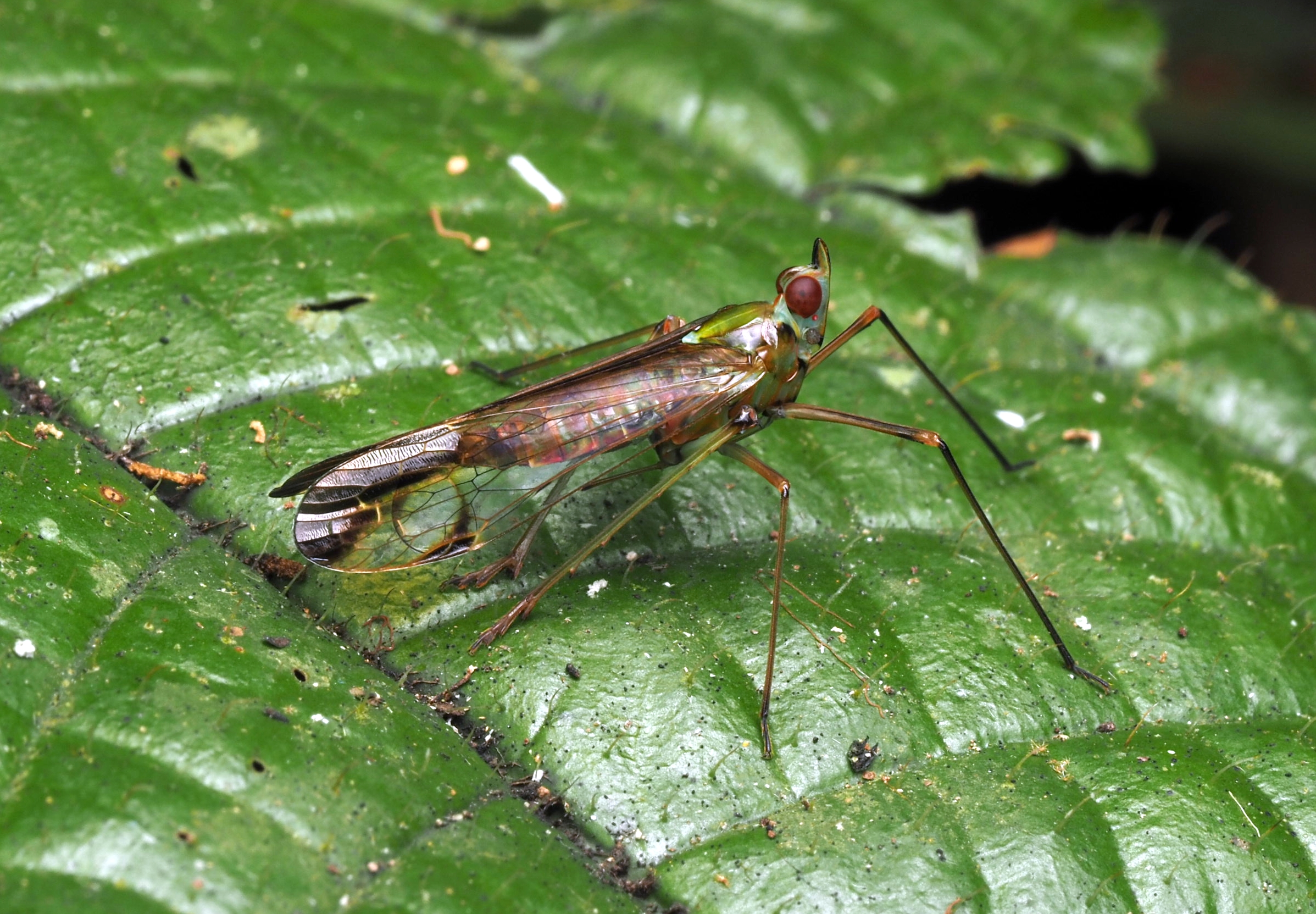

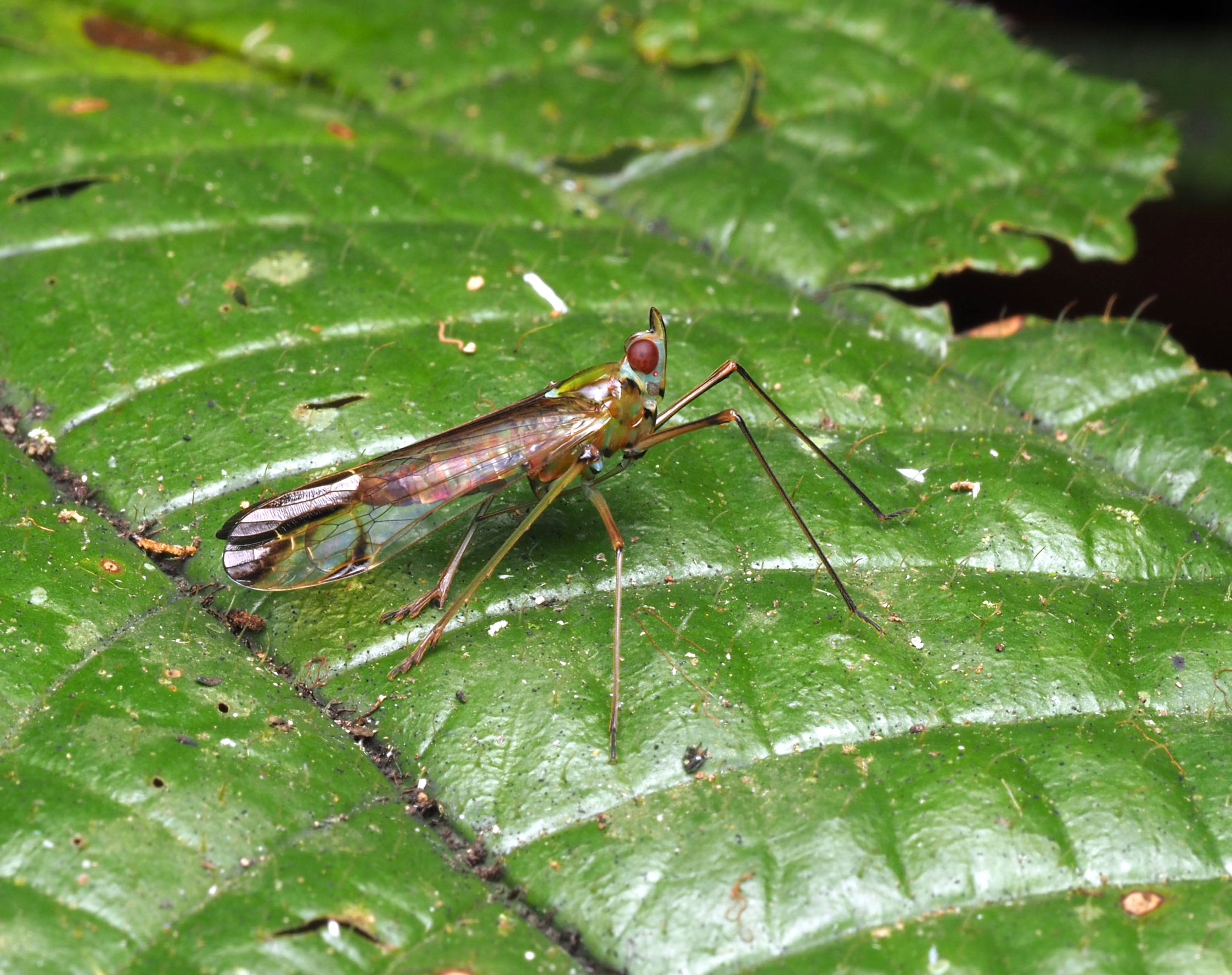
