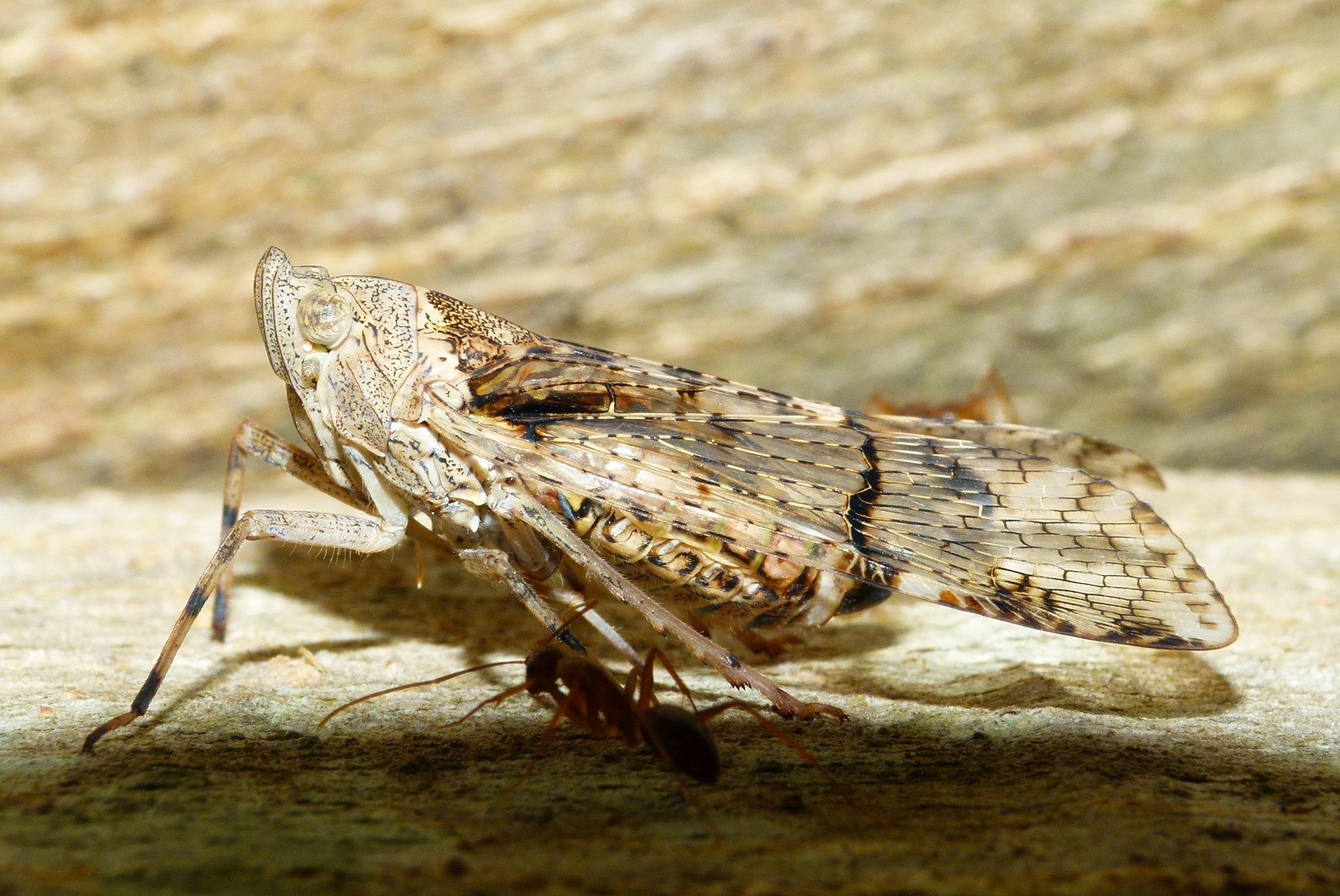
- Dichoptera hyalinata

Scientific classification
- Domain: Eukaryota
- Kingdom: Animalia
- Phylum: Arthropoda
- Class: Insecta
- Order: Hemiptera
- Suborder: Auchenorrhyncha
- Infraorder: Fulgoromorpha
- Family: Fulgoridae
- Subfamily: Dichopterinae
- Genus: Dichoptera; Spinola, 1839

Type species
- Dichoptera hyalinata (Fabricius, 1781)

Species
- D. conspersa Schmidt, 1911; D. guttulosa Stål, 1870; D. hampsoni Distant, 1892; D. hyalinata (Fabricius, 1781); D. lurida (Walker, 1858); D. maculata Schmidt, 1911; D. nasuta Distant, 1892; D. picticeps Stål, 1870; D. signifrons Stål, 1870; D. similis Schumacher, 1915; D. stigivatta Walker, 1858

= Dichoptera =

Genus of planthoppers

Dichoptera is a genus of planthoppers found in tropical Asia. They were formerly placed in the family Dictyopharidae but are now considered members of the family Fulgoridae.

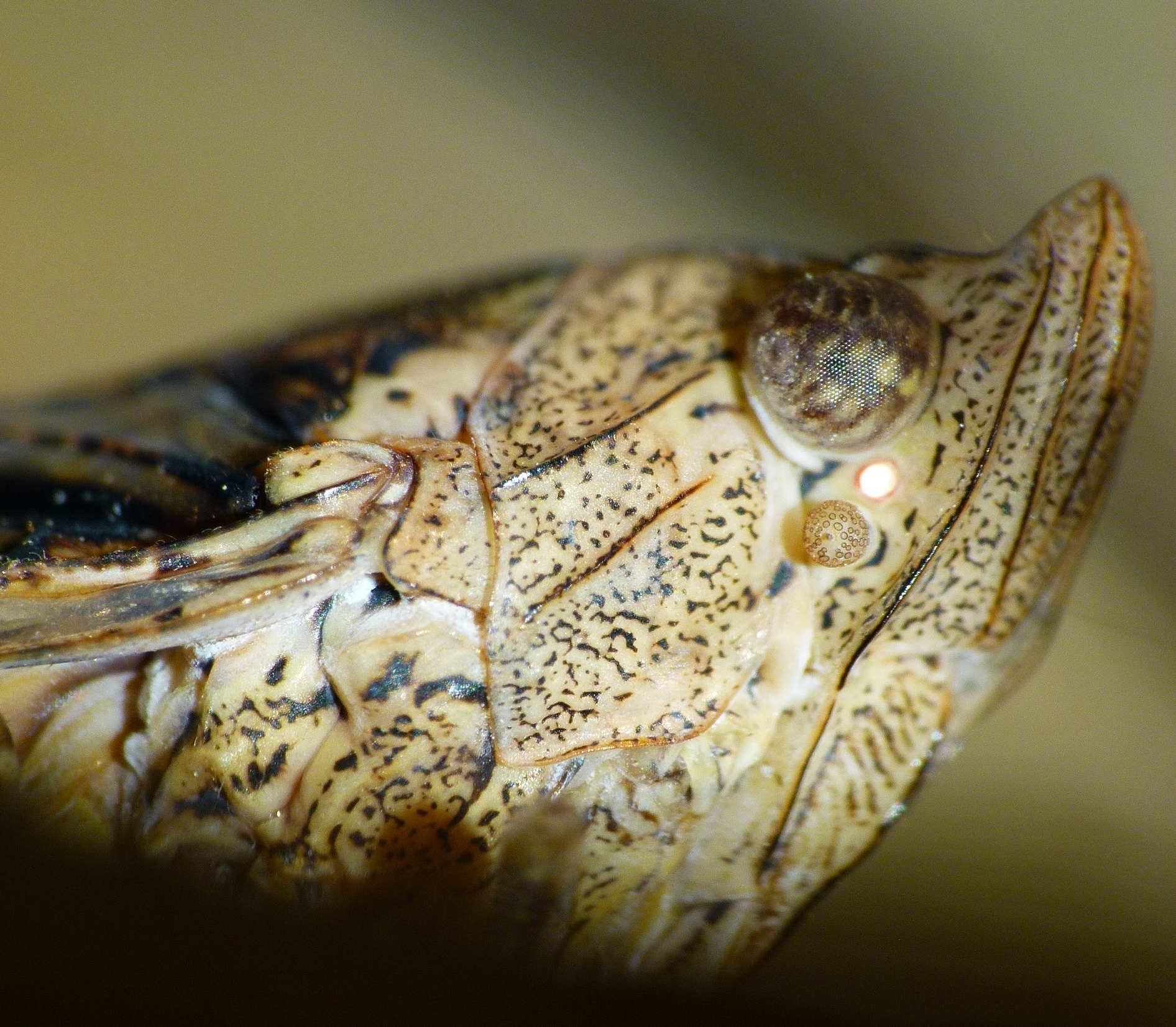
Head profile

They have large and stout bodies with long membranous forewings. The head is short and may have a long process. There are 11 species in the genus.

Often found on the bark of Ficus trees, they are tended by ants and sometimes parasitized by Dryinidae.
