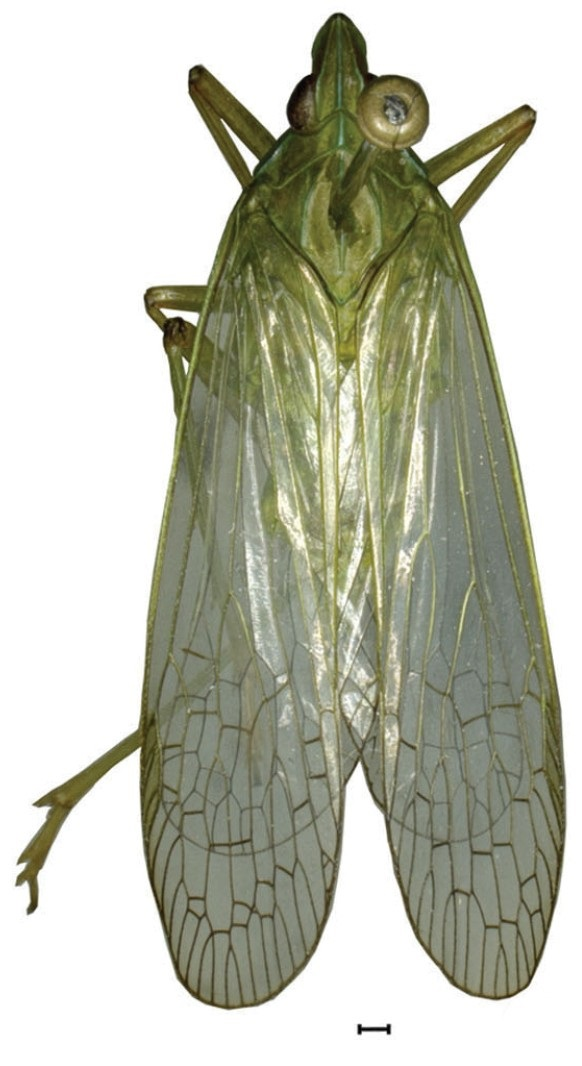

Scientific classification
- Domain: Eukaryota
- Kingdom: Animalia
- Phylum: Arthropoda
- Class: Insecta
- Order: Hemiptera
- Suborder: Auchenorrhyncha
- Infraorder: Fulgoromorpha
- Family: Dictyopharidae
- Genus: Dictyotenguna
- Species: D. angusta

Binomial name
- Dictyotenguna angusta Zheng & Chen, 2014

= Dictyotenguna angusta =

Species of true bug

Dictyotenguna angusta is a species of planthopper native to Guangxi, China. General coloration is green. Males measure 14.6 millimeters long with 11.5 millimeter forewings, and females measure 17.3 millimeters long with 14.1 millimeter wings. The name is derived from Greek angusta, meaning "narrow" or "slender".
