= Phylloscelis rubra =

Scientific classification
- Kingdom: Animalia
- Phylum: Arthropoda
- Clade: Pancrustacea
- Class: Insecta
- Order: Hemiptera
- Suborder: Auchenorrhyncha
- Infraorder: Fulgoromorpha
- Family: Dictyopharidae
- Genus: Phylloscelis
- Species: P. rubra

Binomial name
- Phylloscelis rubra Ball, 1930

Species of insect

Phylloscelis rubra, commonly known as the cranberry toadbug, is a species of planthopper belonging to the family Dictyopharidae, that is a specialist on cranberry. Feeding damage by the cranberry toadbug is characterized by discoloration (reddish to brownish) and dead "burnt" vines, which can lead to reduction in fruit mass and yields. Cranberry toadbug has one generation a year, overwintering as eggs and emerging mid to late July throughout August in New Jersey. They are native to the East Coast of the United States.
