= Florissantia =

Florissantia can refer to:

- Florissantia (plant), an extinct plant genus in the family Malvaceae
- Florissantia (planthopper), an extinct dictyopharid planthopper insect genus
