= Limnia jakovlevi =

Scientific classification
- Kingdom: Animalia
- Phylum: Arthropoda
- Clade: Pancrustacea
- Class: Insecta
- Order: Diptera
- Family: Sciomyzidae
- Genus: Limnia
- Species: L. jakovlevi

Binomial name
- Limnia jakovlevi (Elberg, 1965)

Synonyms
- Neodictya jakovlevi Elberg, 1965

Species of fly

Limnia jakovlevi is a species of fly in the family Sciomyzidae. It is found in the Palearctic.

The fly genus name Neodictya Elberg, 1965 is a junior primary homonym of the planthopper genus name Neodictya Synave, 1965, and permanently invalid under the rules of the ICZN.
