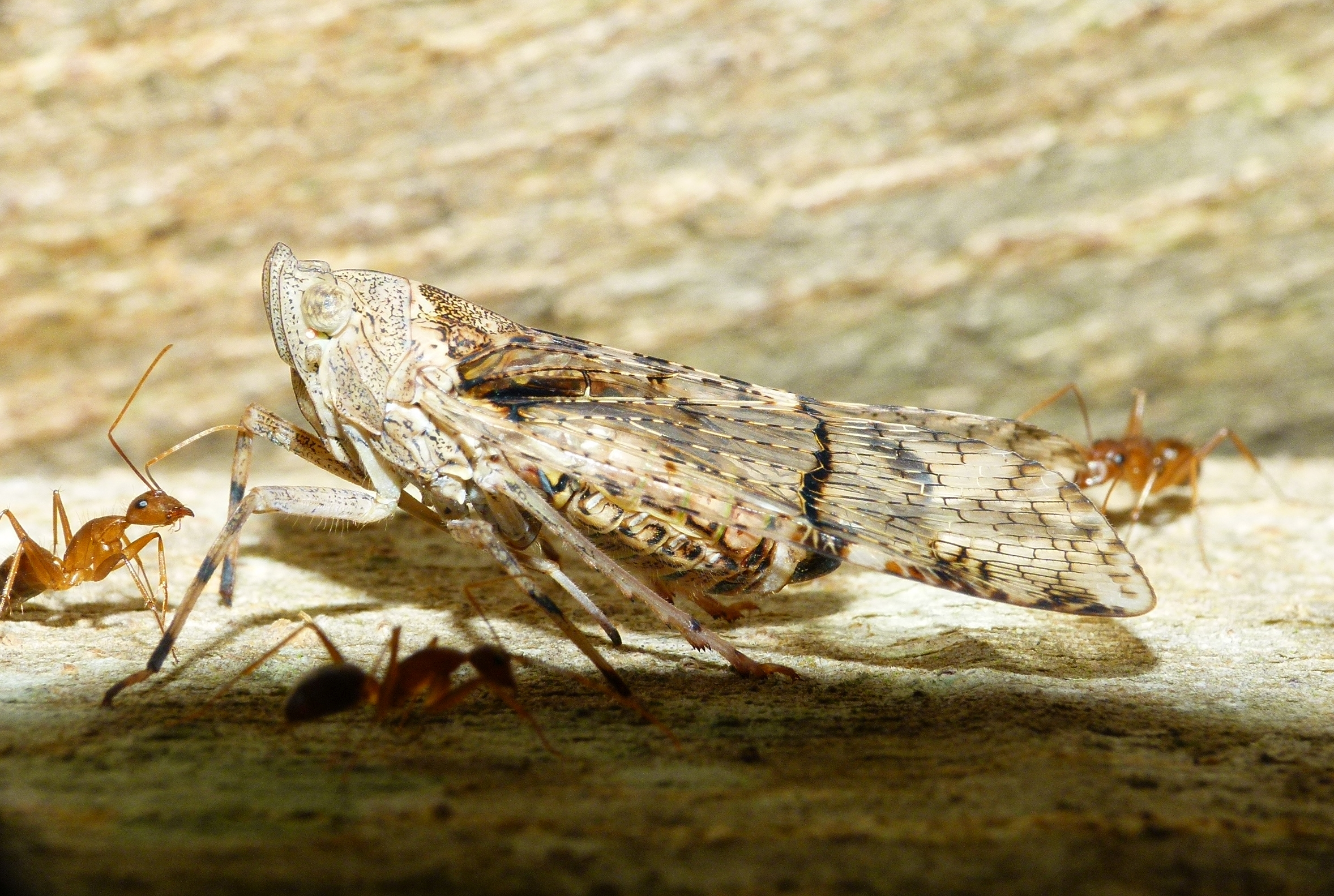
- Dichoptera hyalinata

Scientific classification
- Domain: Eukaryota
- Kingdom: Animalia
- Phylum: Arthropoda
- Class: Insecta
- Order: Hemiptera
- Suborder: Auchenorrhyncha
- Infraorder: Fulgoromorpha
- Superfamily: Fulgoroidea
- Family: Fulgoridae
- Subfamily: Dichopterinae; Melichar, 1912

= Dichopterinae =

Subfamily of true bugs

The Dichopterinae are a sub-family of planthoppers, now placed in the Fulgoridae, erected by Leopold Melichar in 1912. The recorded distribution is: South America, Africa, Europe (German fossil species) and Asia through to Borneo.

== Tribes and Genera ==
Fulgoromorpha Lists On the Web lists:

=== Cladodipterini ===
Authority: Metcalf, 1938 (South America)

1. Cladodiptera Spinola, 1839
2. Diacira Walker, 1858
3. Sclerodepsa Emeljanov, 2011

=== Dichopterini ===
Authority: Melichar, 1912

1. Dichoptera Spinola, 1839 (type genus - Asia)
2. †Wedelphus Szwedo & Wappler, 2006 (Germany)

=== Dorysarthrini ===
Authority: Emeljanov, 1979

1. Dorysarthrus Puton, 1895 (Africa, Middle East)
2. Pibrocha Kirkaldy, 1902 (Sri Lanka, Thailand)

=== Protachilini ===
Authority: Emeljanov, 2013 (South America)

1. Protachilus – monotypic P. rex Fennah, 1944
