= Limnia sparsa =

Scientific classification
- Domain: Eukaryota
- Kingdom: Animalia
- Phylum: Arthropoda
- Class: Insecta
- Order: Diptera
- Family: Sciomyzidae
- Genus: Limnia
- Species: L. sparsa

Binomial name
- Limnia sparsa (Loew, 1862)

Synonyms
- Limnia combinata Cresson, 1920; Tetanocera sparsa Loew, 1862

Species of fly

Limnia sparsa is a species of marsh fly in the family Sciomyzidae.
