= Limnia conica =

Scientific classification
- Domain: Eukaryota
- Kingdom: Animalia
- Phylum: Arthropoda
- Class: Insecta
- Order: Diptera
- Family: Sciomyzidae
- Genus: Limnia
- Species: L. conica

Binomial name
- Limnia conica Steyskal, 1978

Species of fly

Limnia conica is a species of marsh fly in the family Sciomyzidae.
