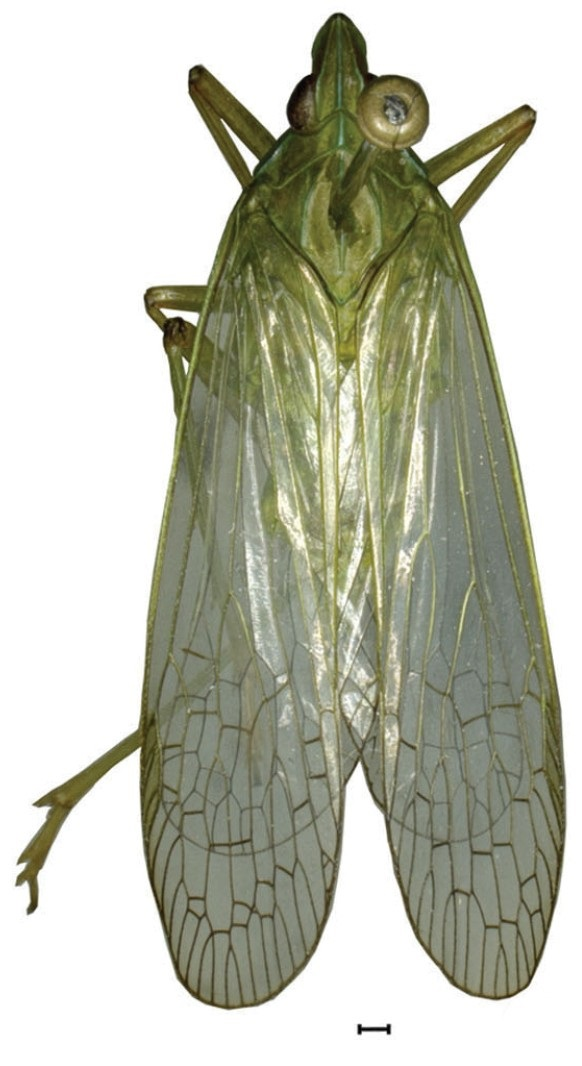
- Dictyotenguna angusta

Scientific classification
- Domain: Eukaryota
- Kingdom: Animalia
- Phylum: Arthropoda
- Class: Insecta
- Order: Hemiptera
- Suborder: Auchenorrhyncha
- Infraorder: Fulgoromorpha
- Family: Dictyopharidae
- Tribe: Orthopagini
- Genus: Dictyotenguna; Song & Liang, 2012

Species
- Dictyotenguna angusta Zheng & Chen, 2014; Dictyotenguna choui Song & Liang, 2012

= Dictyotenguna =

Genus of planthoppers

Dictyotenguna is a genus of planthoppers native to Guangxi, China.
