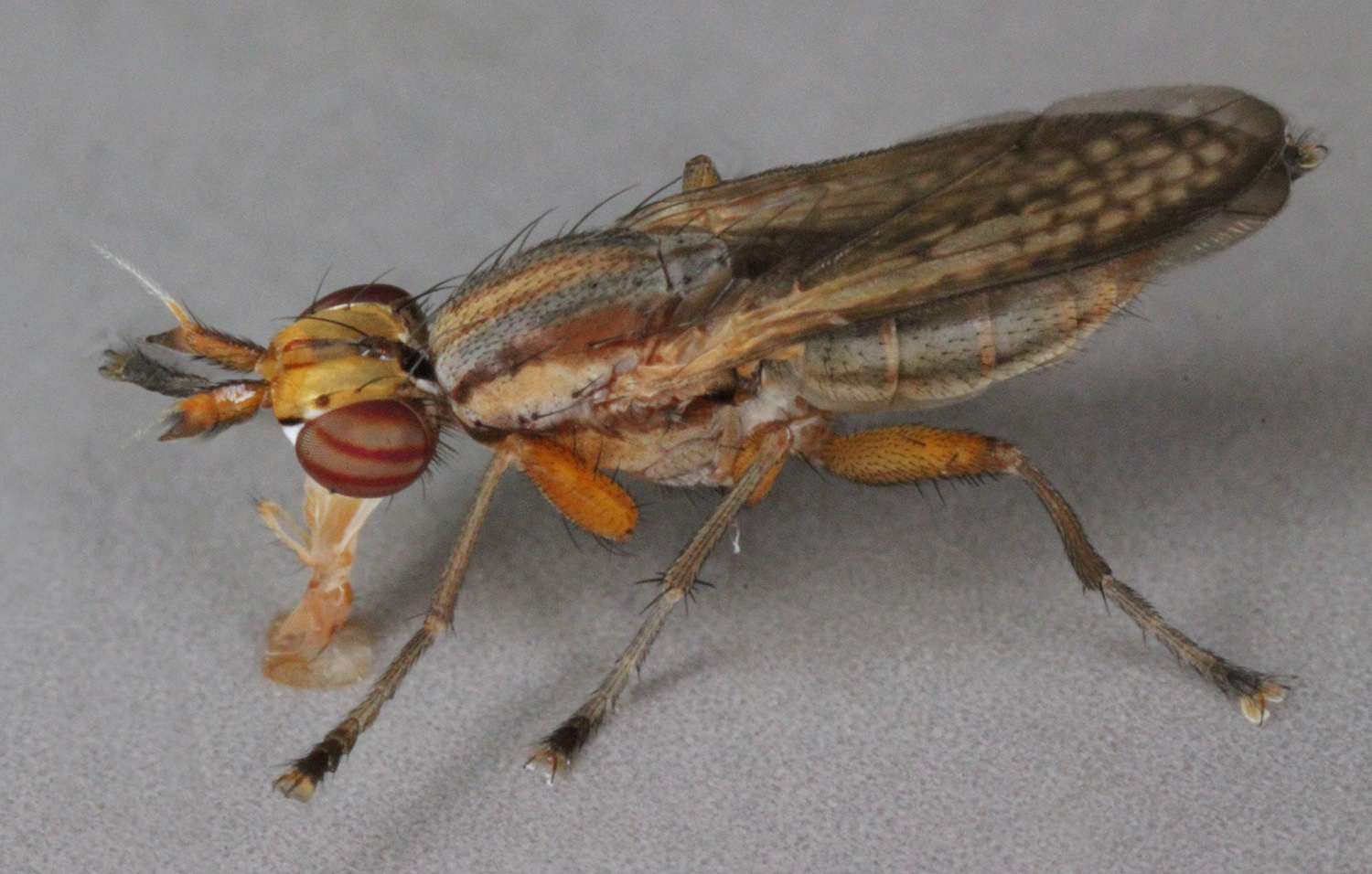
- Limnia unguicornis North Wales

Scientific classification
- Kingdom: Animalia
- Phylum: Arthropoda
- Class: Insecta
- Order: Diptera
- Family: Sciomyzidae
- Genus: Limnia
- Species: L. unguicornis

Binomial name
- Limnia unguicornis (Scopoli, 1763)

Synonyms
- Musca varicus Harris, 1780; Musca varieus Harris, 1780; Tetanocera pratorum Fallén, 1820

= Limnia unguicornis =

Species of fly

Limnia unguicornis is a species of fly in the family Sciomyzidae. It is found in the Palearctic.

The eyes have four purple longitudinal stripes, two medial and two marginal.The head is rufous with brown spots on each side: white face. The third segment of the antennae is blackish at apex the remainder brownish red.The arista is white. The brown ocellar plate is extended to the anterior margin in a depressed band.The thorax is rufous-brown with two grey mesonotal bands. The prothoracic bristles are ciliform. Rufous legs. The wings membrane is studded with numerous pale spots separated by a brown network. For terms see Morphology of Diptera. Limnia unguicornis is carnivorous (occasionally coprophagous).Mature larvae have been recorded feeding on Succinea putris.
