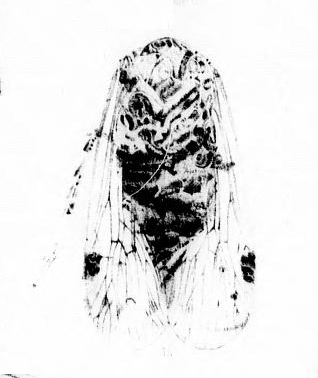
- Florissantia elegans from Scudder 1890

Scientific classification
- Kingdom: Animalia
- Phylum: Arthropoda
- Class: Insecta
- Order: Hemiptera
- Suborder: Auchenorrhyncha
- Infraorder: Fulgoromorpha
- Family: Dictyopharidae
- Genus: †Florissantia; Scudder, 1890
- Species: †F. elegans

Binomial name
- †Florissantia elegans Scudder, 1890

= Florissantia elegans =

Florissantia elegans Temporal range: Late Eocene

Extinct species of true bug

Florissantia is an extinct monotypic genus of planthopper in the dictyopharid subfamily Dictyopharinae. The single species, Florissantia elegans, was described by Samuel Hubbard Scudder (1890) from fossils found in the Florissant Formation of Colorado.

== History and classification ==
At the time of description, both the holotype and paratype of F. elegans were deposited in the paleoentomology collections at Princeton University, with Samuel Scudder's type description of the genus and species being published in a United States Geological Survey of the Territories 1890 monograph. Scudder named the monotypic genus Florissantia after the type locality of Florissant, but did not elaborate on the etymology of the species name elegans.

At the time of description Scudder placed the genus into "subfamily Cixiida" of the "family Fulgorina". The family was later elevated to Superfamily treatment as Fulgoroidea encompassing all planthoppers, with subfamily "Cixiida" being elevated to the family status as Cixiidae. The familial placement of Florissantia was not reevaluated until Emeljanov (1983) who moved it to the family Dictyopharidae. This placement was further refined by Swedo (2008) who included Florissantia in the subfamily Dictyopharinae, but noted that tribal placement was unclear due to the characters visible in the fossils.

== Distribution and paleoecology ==
When described, the genus Florissantia was known from two separate fossils preserved as impressions in fine shales of the Florissant formation in Colorado. The formation is composed of successive lake deposits resulting from a volcanic debris flow damming a valley. When Florissantia was described, the Florissant Formation was considered to be Miocene in age, based on the flora and fauna preserved. Successive research and fossil descriptions moved the age older and by 1985 the formation had been reassigned to an Oligocene age. Further refinement of the formation's age using radiometric dating of sanidine crystals has resulted in an age of 34.07 million years ago placing the formation in the Priabonian stage of the Late Eocene.

The Florissant paleoforest surrounding the lake has been described as similar to modern southeastern North America, with a number of taxa represented that are now found in the subtropics to tropics and confined to the old world. MacGinitie (1953) suggested a warm temperate climate based on the modern biogeographic relatives of the biota found in the formation. Modern estimates of the paleoelevation range between 1,900–4,133 m (6,234–13,560 ft), notably higher than the original estimates by MacGinitie of 300–900 m (980–2,950 ft). Estimates of the mean annual temperature for the Florissant Formation have been derived from climate leaf analysis multivariate program (CLAMP) analysis and modern forest equivalencies of the paleoflora. The results of the various methods have gaven a mean annual temperature rage between approximately 10.8–17.5 °C (51.4–63.5 °F), while the bioclimatic analysis for suggests mean annual precipitation amounts of 50 cm (20 in).

== Description ==
Florissantia elegans adults are 12.5 mm (0.49 in) long by 4.6 mm (0.18 in) at the base of the abdomen, with hemelytra almost the same length as the body at 12.25 mm (0.482 in). The hemelytra about 3 times as long as wide, with a rounded pterostigma positioned near the middle of the apical half. The wing veins are connected by a series of cross veins positioned near the pterostigma. The legs have longitudinal pale and dark striping, with dark colored spines on the 5.5 mm (0.22 in) tibia. Overall the coloration is of a dark tone, with light markings on the abdominal region while the thorax has a punctate texture that changes to a reticulate texture on the scutellum.
