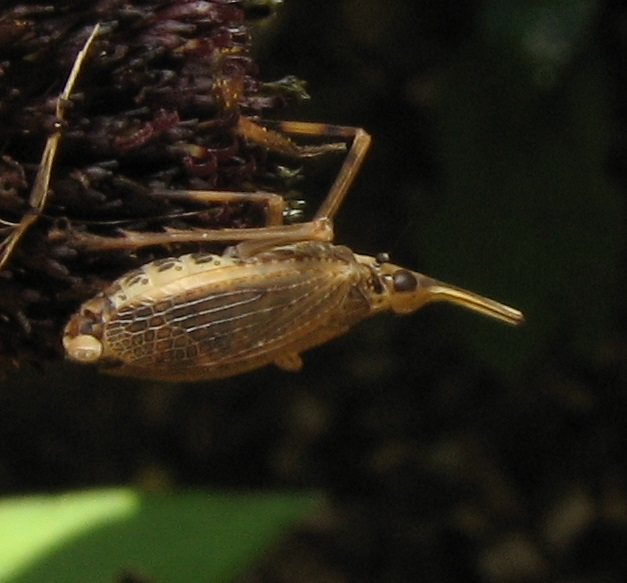
- Scolops sulcipes

Scientific classification
- Domain: Eukaryota
- Kingdom: Animalia
- Phylum: Arthropoda
- Class: Insecta
- Order: Hemiptera
- Suborder: Auchenorrhyncha
- Infraorder: Fulgoromorpha
- Family: Dictyopharidae
- Subfamily: Dictyopharinae
- Genus: Scolops; Schaum, 1850

= Scolops =

Genus of planthoppers

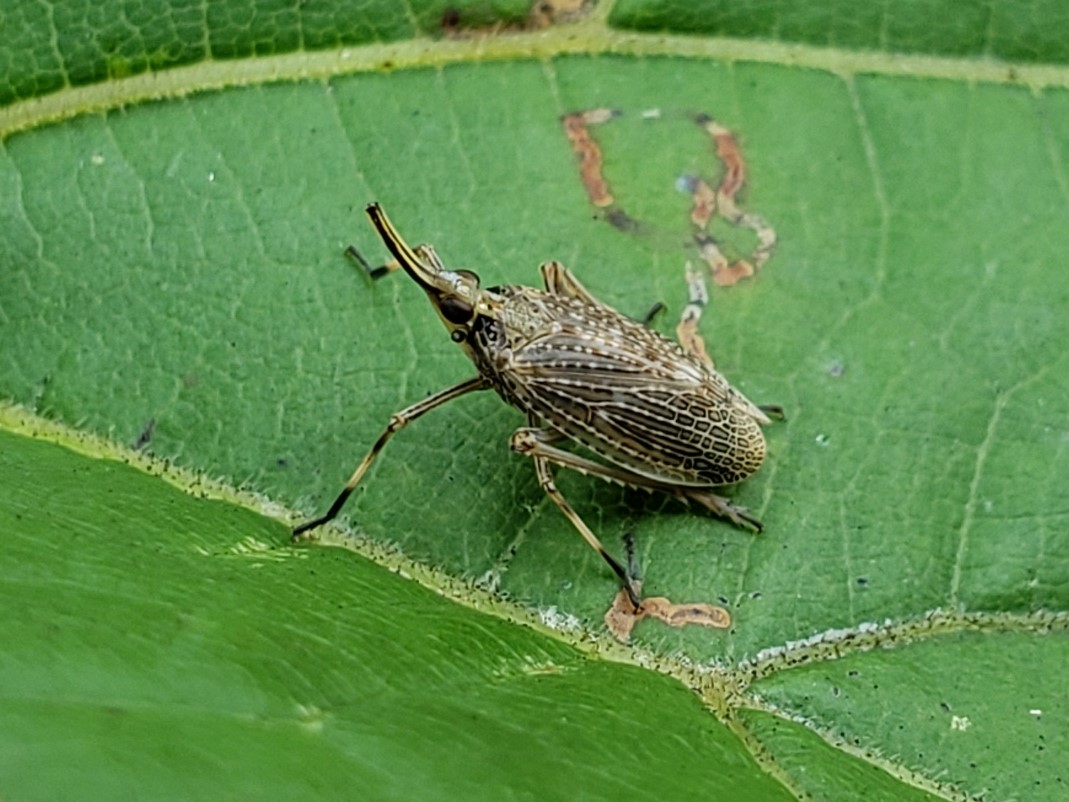
Scolops species

Scolops is a North American genus of dictyopharid planthoppers in the subfamily Dictyopharinae. There are over 30 described species in the genus Scolops.

== Species ==
- Scolops abnormis Ball, 1902^{c g b}
- Scolops angustatus Uhler, 1876^{c g b}
- Scolops austrinus Breakey, 1929^{c g}
- Scolops californicus Lawson & Beamer, 1930^{c g}
- Scolops cockerelli (Fowler, 1904)^{c g b}
- Scolops excultus Lawson & Beamer, 1930^{c g b}
- Scolops flavidus Breakey, 1929^{c g}
- Scolops fumidus (Uhler, 1891)^{c g}
- Scolops graphicus Ball, 1930^{c g}
- Scolops grossus Uhler, 1876^{c g b}
- Scolops hesperius Uhler, 1876^{c g b}
- Scolops immanis Breakey, 1929^{c g b}
- Scolops luridus Breakey, 1929^{c g}
- Scolops maculosus Ball, 1902^{c g}
- Scolops neomexicanus Beamer & Lawson, 1930^{c g}
- Scolops nicholi Ball, 1937^{c g}
- Scolops osborni Ball, 1902^{c g}
- Scolops pallidus Uhler, 1900^{c g b}
- Scolops perdix Uhler, 1900^{c g b}
- Scolops pruinosus Breakey, 1929^{c g}
- Scolops pungens (Germar, 1830)^{c g b}
- Scolops robustus Ball, 1902^{c g}
- Scolops snowi Breakey, 1929^{c g}
- Scolops socorroensis Lawson & Beamer, 1930^{c g}
- Scolops stonei Breakey, 1929^{c g}
- Scolops sulcipes (Say, 1825)^{c g b} (the partridge bug)
- Scolops tanneri Ball, 1937^{c g}
- Scolops texanus Lawson & Beamer, 1930^{c g b}
- Scolops uhleri Ball, 1902^{c g b}
- Scolops vanduzeei Ball, 1902^{c g}
- Scolops virescens Ball, 1937^{c g}
- Scolops viridis Ball, 1902^{c g}

Data sources: i = ITIS, c = Catalogue of Life, g = GBIF, b = Bugguide.net
