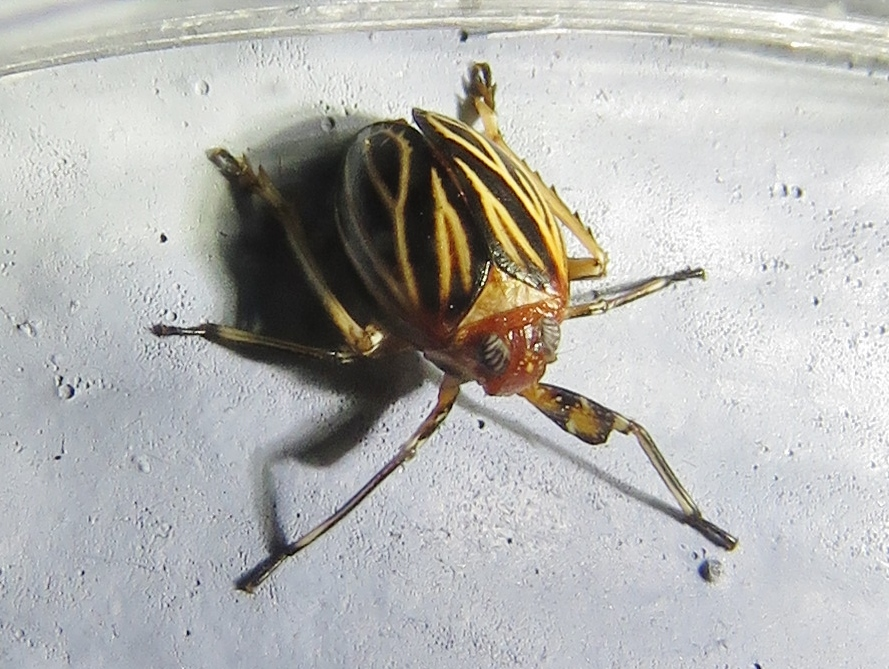

Scientific classification
- Kingdom: Animalia
- Phylum: Arthropoda
- Clade: Pancrustacea
- Class: Insecta
- Order: Hemiptera
- Suborder: Auchenorrhyncha
- Infraorder: Fulgoromorpha
- Family: Dictyopharidae
- Subfamily: Dictyopharinae
- Genus: Phylloscelis; Germar, 1839

= Phylloscelis =

Genus of planthoppers

Phylloscelis is genus of planthoppers known as toadhoppers belonging to the family Dictyopharidae, subfamily Dictyopharinae, and tribe Phylloscelini, with four recognized species. They are widespread but localized over much of the United State, and especially along the East Coast.

The recognized species and their known host plants are:

- Phylloscelis atra, or the black leaf-leg, which feeds on Rhus copallina (Anacardiaceae)
- Phylloscelis pallescens which feeds on Pycnanthemum tenuifolium (Lamiaceae)
- Phylloscelis pennata which feeds on Solanum sp. (Solanaceae)
- Phylloscelis rubra, or the cranberry toadbug, which feeds on Vaccinium macrocarpon (Ericaceae)

The scientific genus name Phylloscelis means "leaf leg" derives from Greek (phyllon: leaf and skelis: leg), referring to the leaf-like flanges on the insect's front legs .
