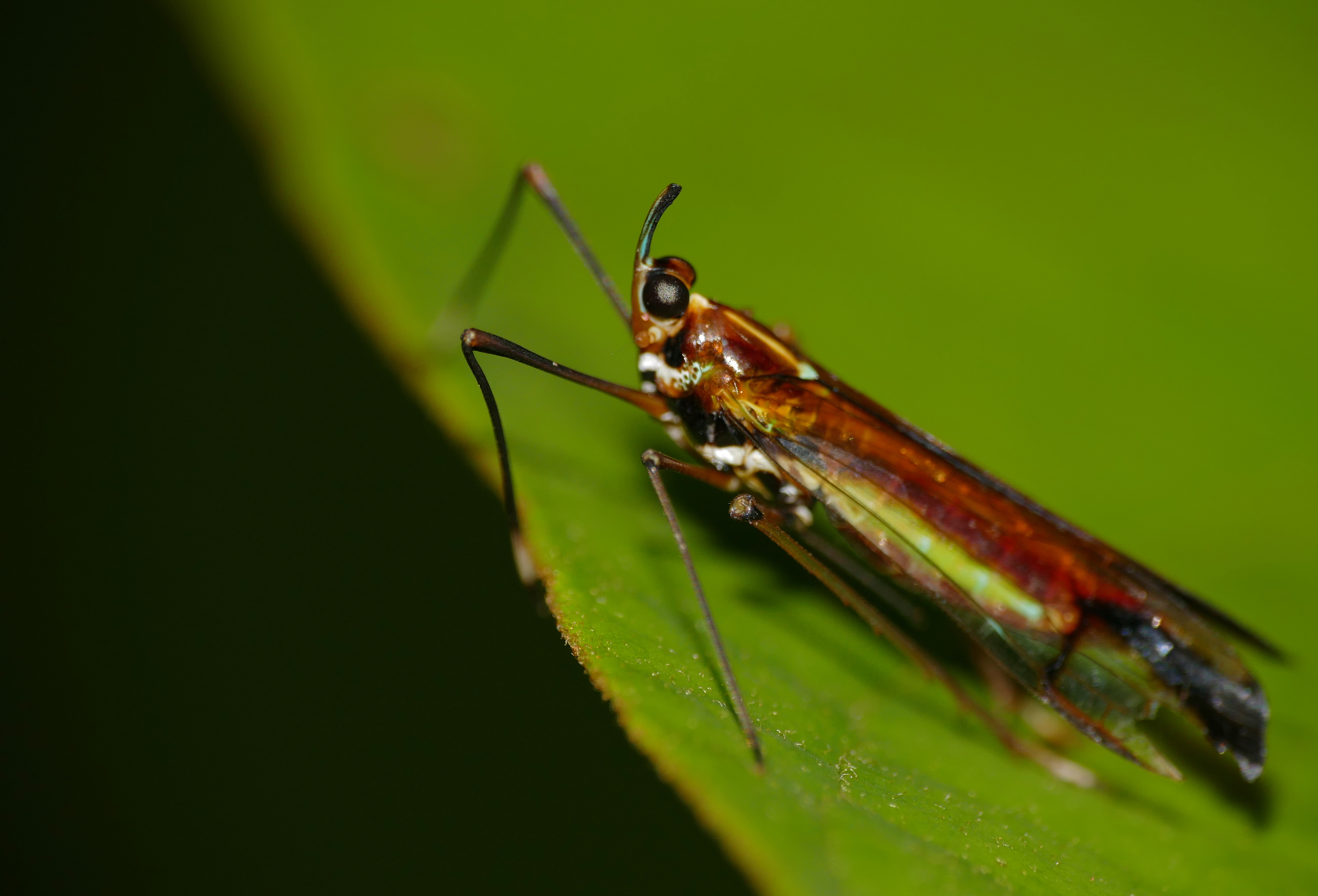
- Miasa nigromaculata

Scientific classification
- Domain: Eukaryota
- Kingdom: Animalia
- Phylum: Arthropoda
- Class: Insecta
- Order: Hemiptera
- Suborder: Auchenorrhyncha
- Infraorder: Fulgoromorpha
- Family: Dictyopharidae
- Tribe: Orthopagini
- Genus: Miasa; Distant, 1906

Type species
- Elidiptera smaragdilinea Walker, 1857

Synonyms
- Putalamorpha Bierman, 1910; Pseudoprionopeltis (Australopeltis) Johns, 1964

= Miasa (planthopper) =

Genus of planthoppers

Miasa is a planthopper genus in the family Dictyopharidae. Currently, seven species are identified in the genus. They are distributed in the Oriental regions of Indonesia (Borneo, Java, Sumatra), Malaysia (Borneo, Sabah, Sarawak, peninsula), China (Yunnan), Thailand, Vietnam, Singapore and Myanmar.

== Species ==
1. Miasa borneensis Song, Webb & Liang, 2014
2. Miasa dichotoma Zheng & Chen, 2018
3. Miasa nigromaculata Song, Webb & Liang, 2014
4. Miasa producta (Lethierry, 1888)
5. Miasa smaragdilinea (Walker, 1857) - type species
6. Miasa trifoliusa Zheng & Chen, 2018
7. Miasa wallacei Muir, 1923
