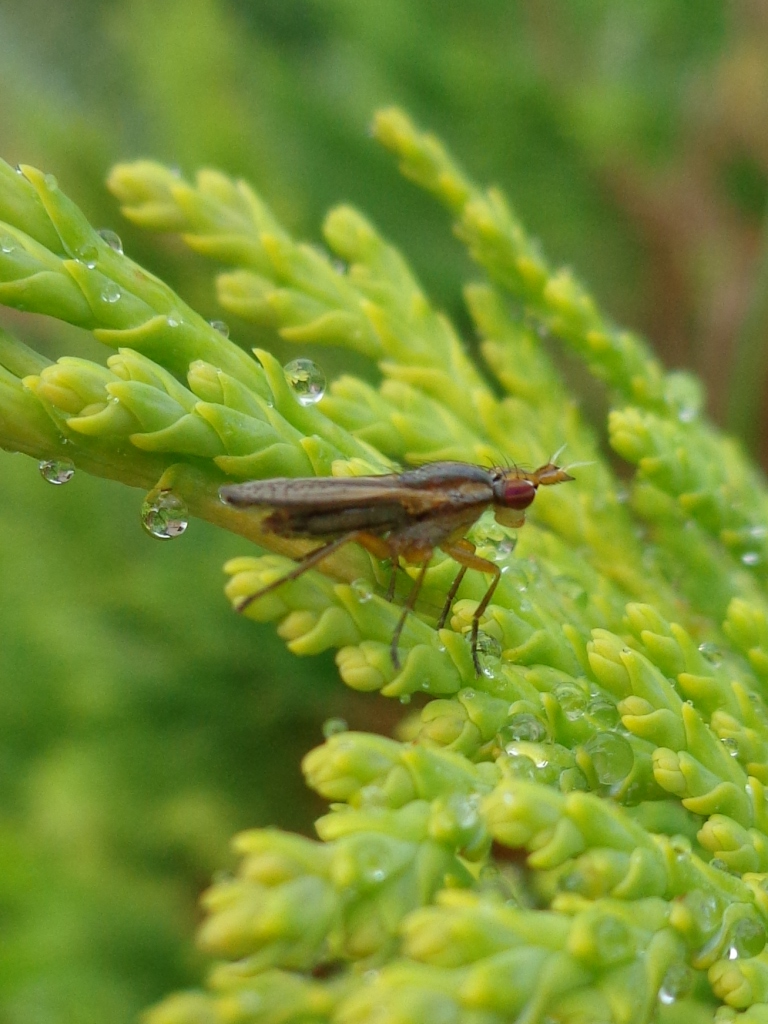
- Limnia unguicornis

Scientific classification
- Kingdom: Animalia
- Phylum: Arthropoda
- Clade: Pancrustacea
- Class: Insecta
- Order: Diptera
- Family: Sciomyzidae
- Subfamily: Sciomyzinae
- Tribe: Tetanocerini
- Genus: Limnia; Robineau-Desvoidy, 1830

Type species
- Musca limbata Fabricius, 1830

= Limnia (fly) =

Genus of flies

Limnia is a genus of flies in the family Sciomyzidae, the marsh flies or snail-killing flies.

== Species ==
- L. alpina Mayer, 1953
- L. appenninica Rivosecchi & Santagata, 1979
- L. boscii (Robineau-Desvoidy, 1830)
- L. brevicostalis Melander, 1920
- L. capensis Schiner, 1868
- L. castanea Hutton, 1904
- L. claripennis Robineau-Desvoidy, 1830
- L. conica Steyskal, 1978
- L. dejeani Robineau-Desvoidy, 1830
- L. fitchi Steyskal, 1978
- L. flavostriata Villeneuve, 1912
- L. georgiae Melander, 1920
- L. hendeli Mayer, 1953
- L. inopa (Adams, 1904)
- L. jakovlevi (Elberg, 1965)
- L. japonica Yano, 1978
- L. lemmoni Fisher & Orth, 1971
- L. limbata Robineau-Desvoidy, 1830
- L. lindbergi Steyskal, 1978
- L. louisianae Melander, 1920
- L. maculatissima Strobl, 1906
- L. mannii Schiner, 1864
- L. marginalis Robineau-Desvoidy, 1830
- L. mehadiensis Oldenberg, 1923
- L. nambai Steyskal, 1978
- L. nigrescens Becker, 1907
- L. obscura Hutton, 1901
- L. pacifica Elberg, 1965
- L. paludicola Elberg, 1965
- L. pubescens (Day, 1881)
- L. sandovalensis Fisher & Orth, 1978
- L. saratogensis (Fitch, 1855)
- L. setosa Yano, 1978
- L. shannoni Cresson, 1920
- L. sparsa (Loew, 1862)
- L. stiticaria Mayer, 1953
- L. striata Hutton, 1904
- L. syriaca Mayer, 1953
- L. testacea Sack, 1939
- L. tranquilla Hutton, 1901
- L. transmarina Schiner, 1868
- L. unguicornis (Scopoli, 1763)
