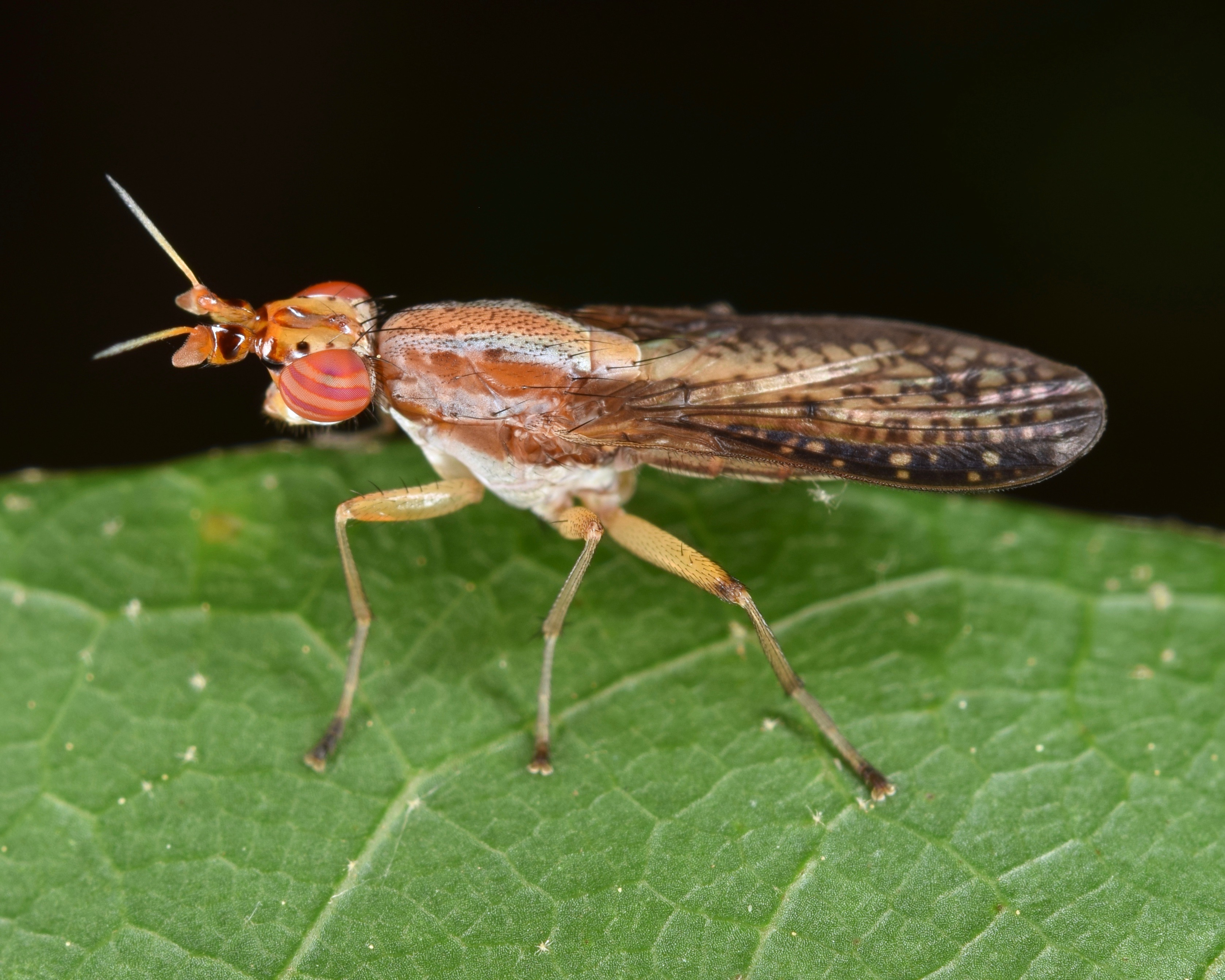

Scientific classification
- Domain: Eukaryota
- Kingdom: Animalia
- Phylum: Arthropoda
- Class: Insecta
- Order: Diptera
- Family: Sciomyzidae
- Genus: Limnia
- Species: L. shannoni

Binomial name
- Limnia shannoni Cresson, 1920

= Limnia shannoni =

Species of marsh fly

Limnia shannoni is a species of marsh fly in the family Sciomyzidae.
