= Limnia paludicola =

Scientific classification
- Kingdom: Animalia
- Phylum: Arthropoda
- Class: Insecta
- Order: Diptera
- Family: Sciomyzidae
- Genus: Limnia
- Species: L. paludicola

Binomial name
- Limnia paludicola Elberg, 1965

Species of fly

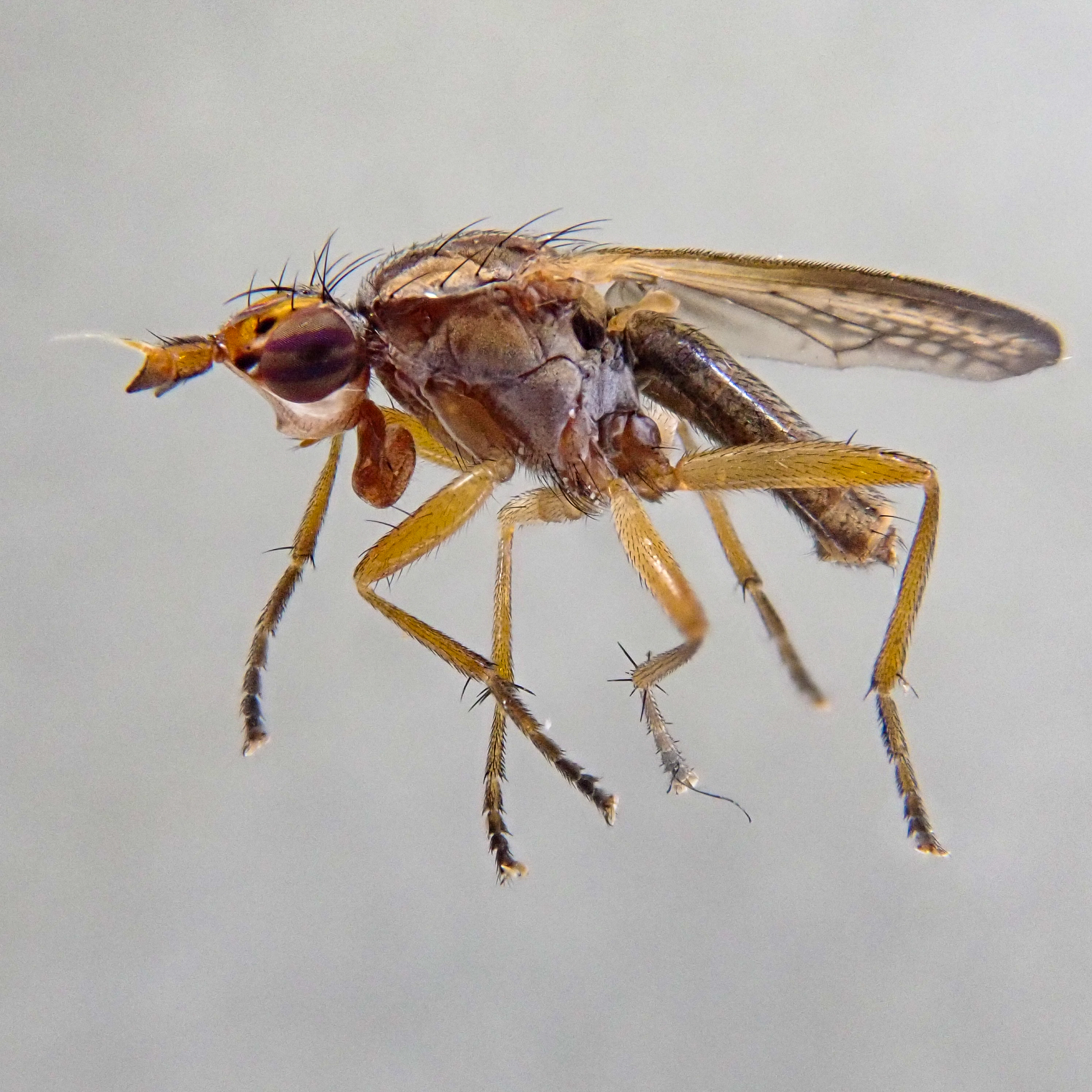

Limnia paludicola is a species of fly in the family Sciomyzidae. It is found in the Palearctic.
