= Almana =

- Almana longipes in Spain

Scientific classification
- Kingdom: Animalia
- Phylum: Arthropoda
- Clade: Pancrustacea
- Class: Insecta
- Order: Hemiptera
- Suborder: Auchenorrhyncha
- Infraorder: Fulgoromorpha
- Family: Dictyopharidae
- Subfamily: Orgeriinae
- Genus: Almana; Stål, 1861
- Species: A. longipes

Binomial name
- Almana longipes (Dufour, 1849)

Genus of planthoppers

Almana is a monotypic genus of planthoppers belonging to the family Dictyopharidae. The only species is Almana longipes.

The species is found in Iberian Peninsula.
