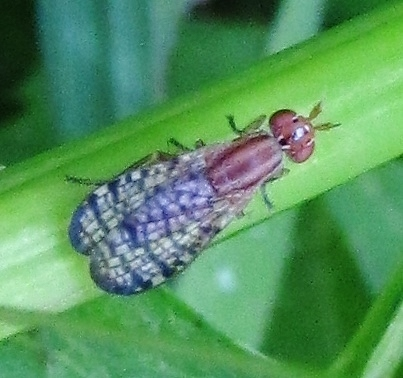

Scientific classification
- Domain: Eukaryota
- Kingdom: Animalia
- Phylum: Arthropoda
- Class: Insecta
- Order: Diptera
- Family: Sciomyzidae
- Genus: Limnia
- Species: L. boscii

Binomial name
- Limnia boscii (Robineau-Desvoidy, 1830)

Synonyms
- Pherbina boscii Robineau-Desvoidy, 1830; Tetanocera combinata Loew, 1859

= Limnia boscii =

Species of fly

Limnia boscii is a species of marsh fly in the family Sciomyzidae.
