= Neodictya =

Scientific classification
- Domain: Eukaryota
- Kingdom: Animalia
- Phylum: Arthropoda
- Class: Insecta
- Order: Hemiptera
- Suborder: Auchenorrhyncha
- Infraorder: Fulgoromorpha
- Family: Dictyopharidae
- Tribe: Dictyopharini
- Genus: Neodictya; Synave, 1965

Genus of planthoppers

Neodictya is a genus of planthoppers in the family Dictyopharidae, native to Africa.

== Species ==
GBIF lists:

1. Neodictya arethusa Linnavuori, 1973
2. Neodictya currax (Fennah, 1958)
3. Neodictya fluvialis Synave, 1965
4. Neodictya izzardi Synave, 1965
5. Neodictya paupera (Melichar, 1912)
6. Neodictya suavis (Fennah, 1958)
