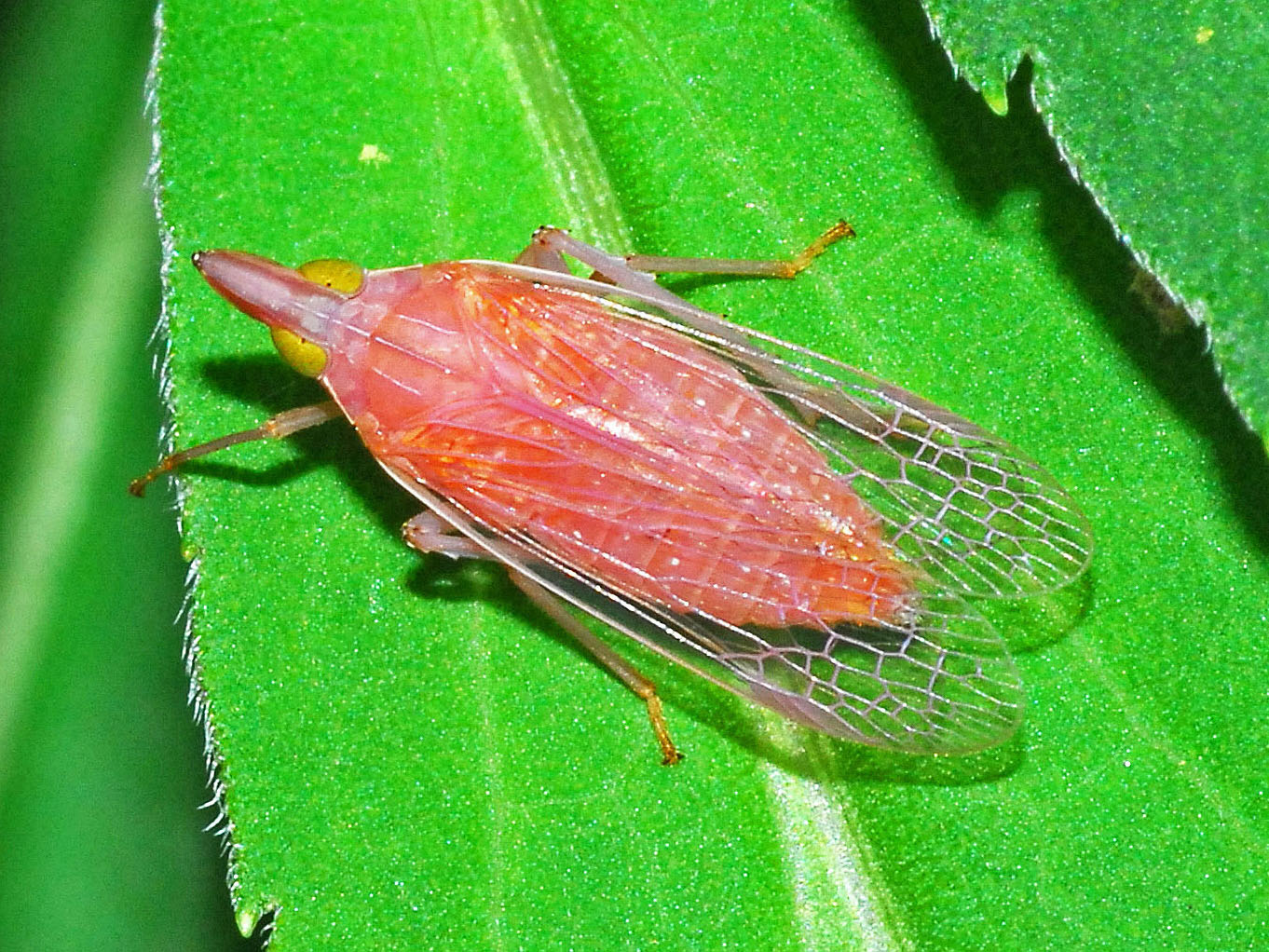
- Dictyophara europaea

Scientific classification
- Kingdom: Animalia
- Phylum: Arthropoda
- Clade: Pancrustacea
- Class: Insecta
- Order: Hemiptera
- Suborder: Auchenorrhyncha
- Infraorder: Fulgoromorpha
- Family: Dictyopharidae
- Subfamily: Dictyopharinae; Spinola, 1839

= Dictyopharinae =

Subfamily of true bugs

Dictyopharinae is a subfamily of dictyopharid planthoppers in the family Dictyopharidae. There more than 100 genera and 500 described species in Dictyopharinae.

== Tribes and genera ==
Dictyopharinae contains 13 extant tribes:

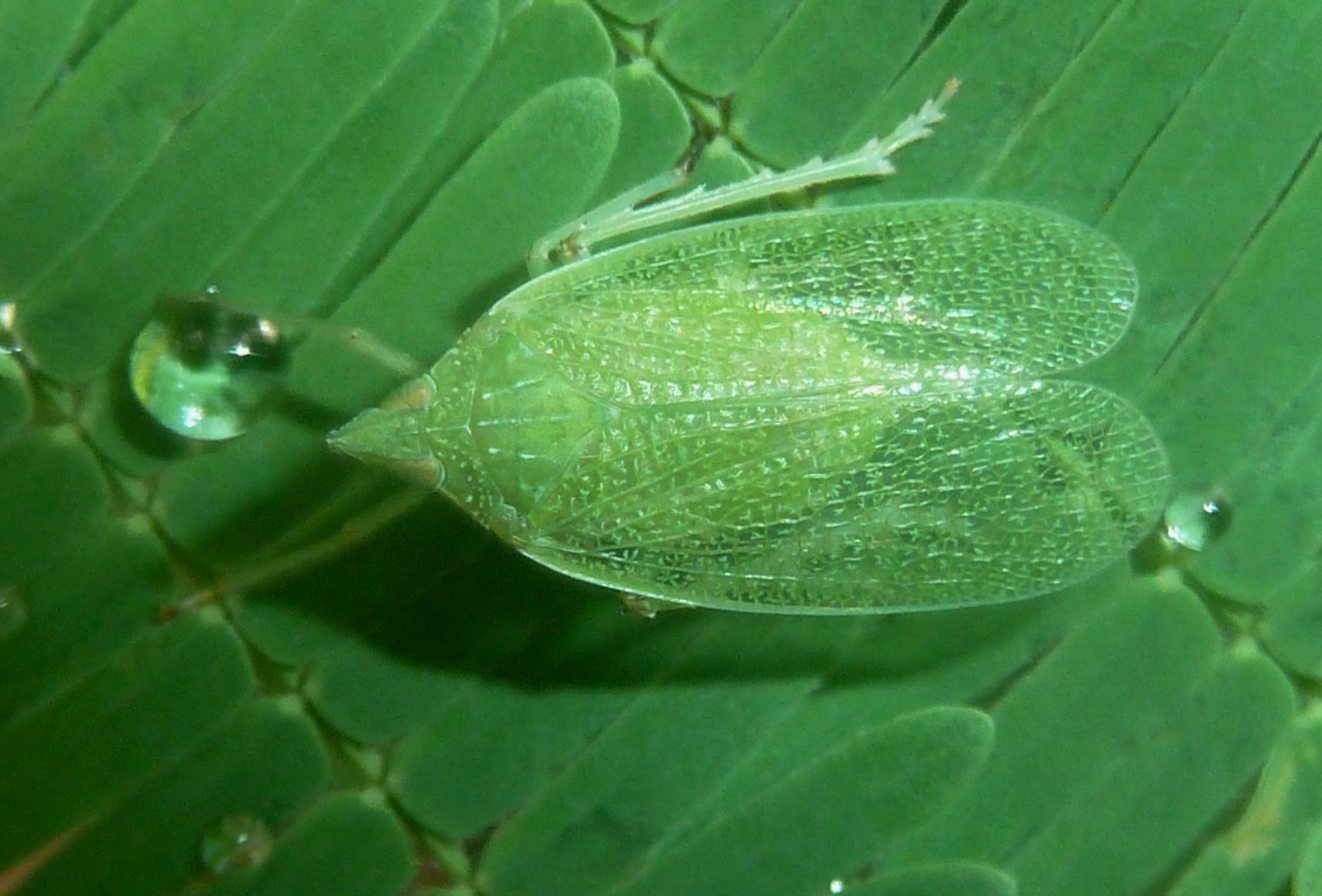
Aselgeia ramulifera

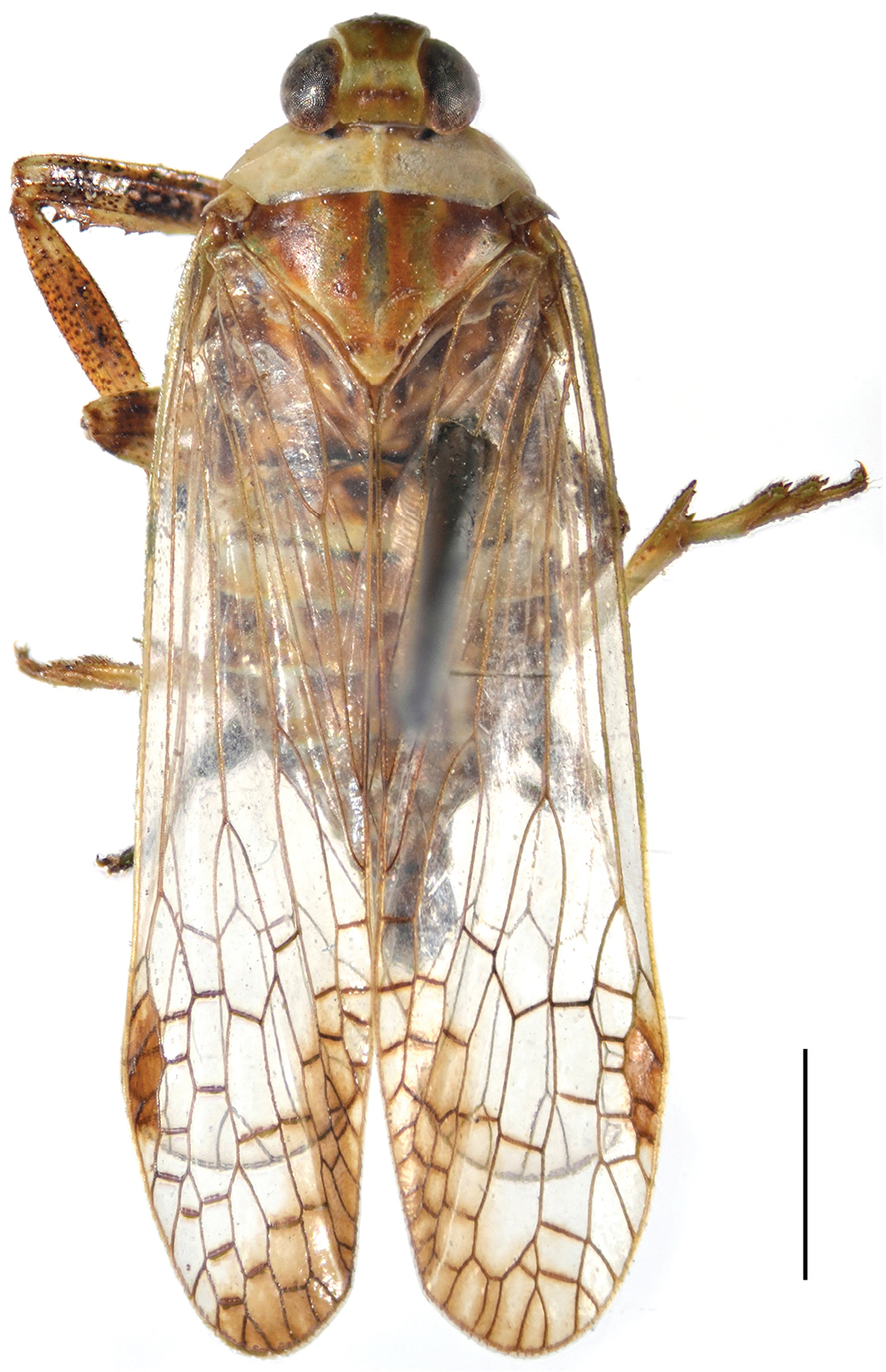
Chiltana acarinata

=== Aluntiini ===
Authority: Emeljanov, 1979; distribution: Africa, Asia

1. Aluntia Stål, 1866 - type genus, tropical Africa
2. Dendrophora Melichar, 1903 - Sri Lanka, W. Malesia
3. Dictyomorpha Melichar, 1912 - China, Indochina, Malesia
4. Indodictyophara Liang & Song, 2012 - India
5. Madagascaritia Song & Liang, 2016 - Madagascar

=== Arjunini ===
Authority: Song & Szwedo, 2016; distribution: Malesia, New Guinea

1. Arjuna Muir, 1934^{c g}
2. Pippax Emeljanov, 2008

=== Capenini ===
Authority: Emeljanov, 1969; distribution: S. Africa

1. Capena Stål, 1866^{c g}
2. Diasphax Fennah, 1962
3. Menenches Fennah, 1962

=== Cleotychini ===
Authority: Emeljanov, 1997; distribution: Australia

1. Cleotyche Emeljanov, 1997

=== Dictyopharini ===
Authority: Spinola, 1839; distribution: Africa, Europe, Asia

1. Aethiocera Emeljanov, 2008
2. Afronersia Fennah, 1958
3. Aselgeia Walker, 1851
4. Avephora Bierman, 1910
5. Callodictya Melichar, 1912
6. Carphotoma Emeljanov, 2008
7. Chiltana Shakila & Akbar, 1995
8. Cormophana Emeljanov, 2011
9. Daploce Emeljanov, 2008
10. Dictyohimalaya Song & Liang, 2020
11. Dictyophara Germar, 1833^{c g}
12. Doryphorina Melichar, 1912
13. Emeljanovina Xing & Chen, 2013
14. Engela Distant, 1906^{c g}
15. Gilgitia Shakila, 1991
16. Indrival Fennah, 1978
17. Issomimus Jacobi in Sjöstedt, 1910
18. Mathetris Emeljanov, 2011
19. Neodictya Synave, 1965^{g}
20. Neodictyophara Distant, 1910
21. Neomiasa Fennah, 1947
22. Paradictya Melichar, 1912
23. Paradictyopharina Song & Liang, 2011
24. Paranagnia Melichar, 1912
25. Philotheria Melichar, 1912
26. Pseudophanella Fennah, 1958
27. Putala Melichar, 1903
28. Raivuna Fennah, 1978
29. Raphiophora Schaum, 1851
30. Rhaba Distant, 1906^{c g}
31. Sinodictya Matsumura, 1940
32. Tenguella Matsumura, 1909^{c g}
33. Tropidophara Bierman, 1910
34. Tupala Stroinski & Szwedo, 2015
35. Tylacra Emeljanov, 2008
36. Zaputala Emeljanov, 2008
37. Zedochir Fennah, 1978

=== Hastini ===
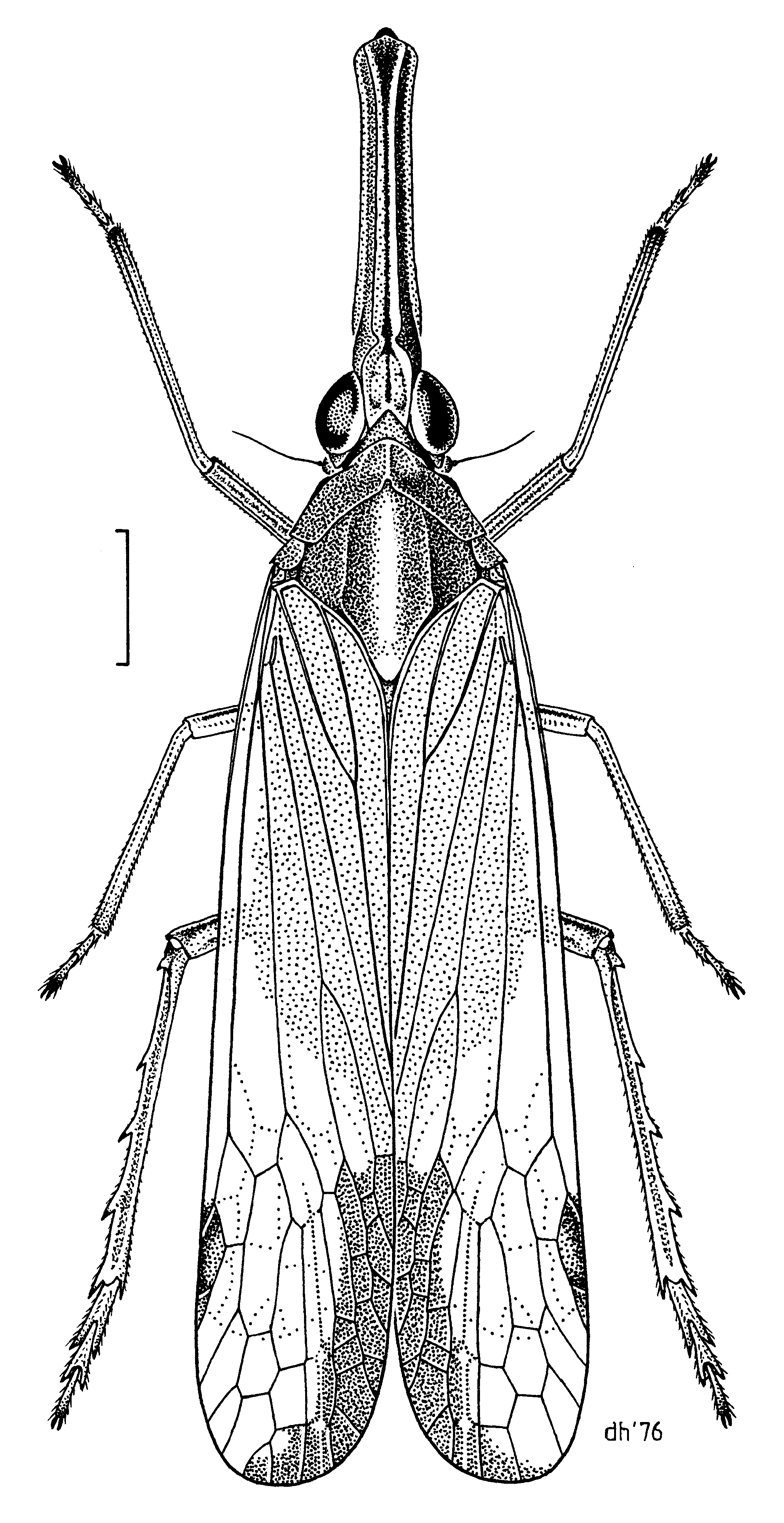
Thanatodictya tillyardi

Authority: Emeljanov, 1983; distribution: Australia, Pacific

1. Anasta Emeljanov, 2008
2. Articrius Emeljanov, 2008
3. Dorimargus Melichar, 1912
4. Eudictya Melichar, 1912
5. Hasta Kirkaldy, 1906^{c g}
6. Thanatodictya Kirkaldy, 1906

=== Lappidini ===
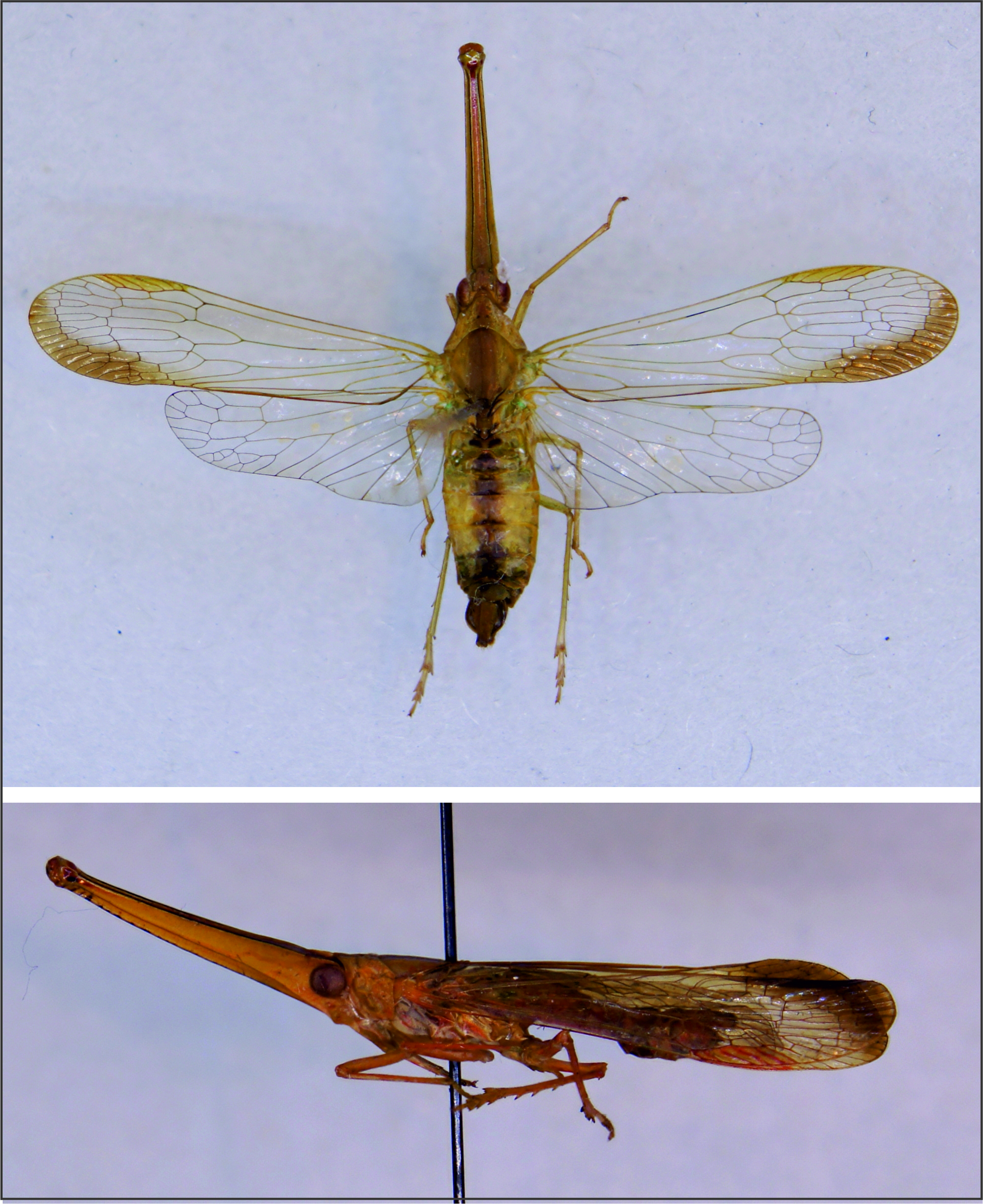
Lappida sp.

Authority: Emeljanov, 1983; distribution: S. America

1. Hydriena Melichar, 1912
2. Igava Melichar, 1912
3. Lappida Amyot & Audinet-Serville, 1843
4. Toropa Melichar, 1912

=== Nersiini ===
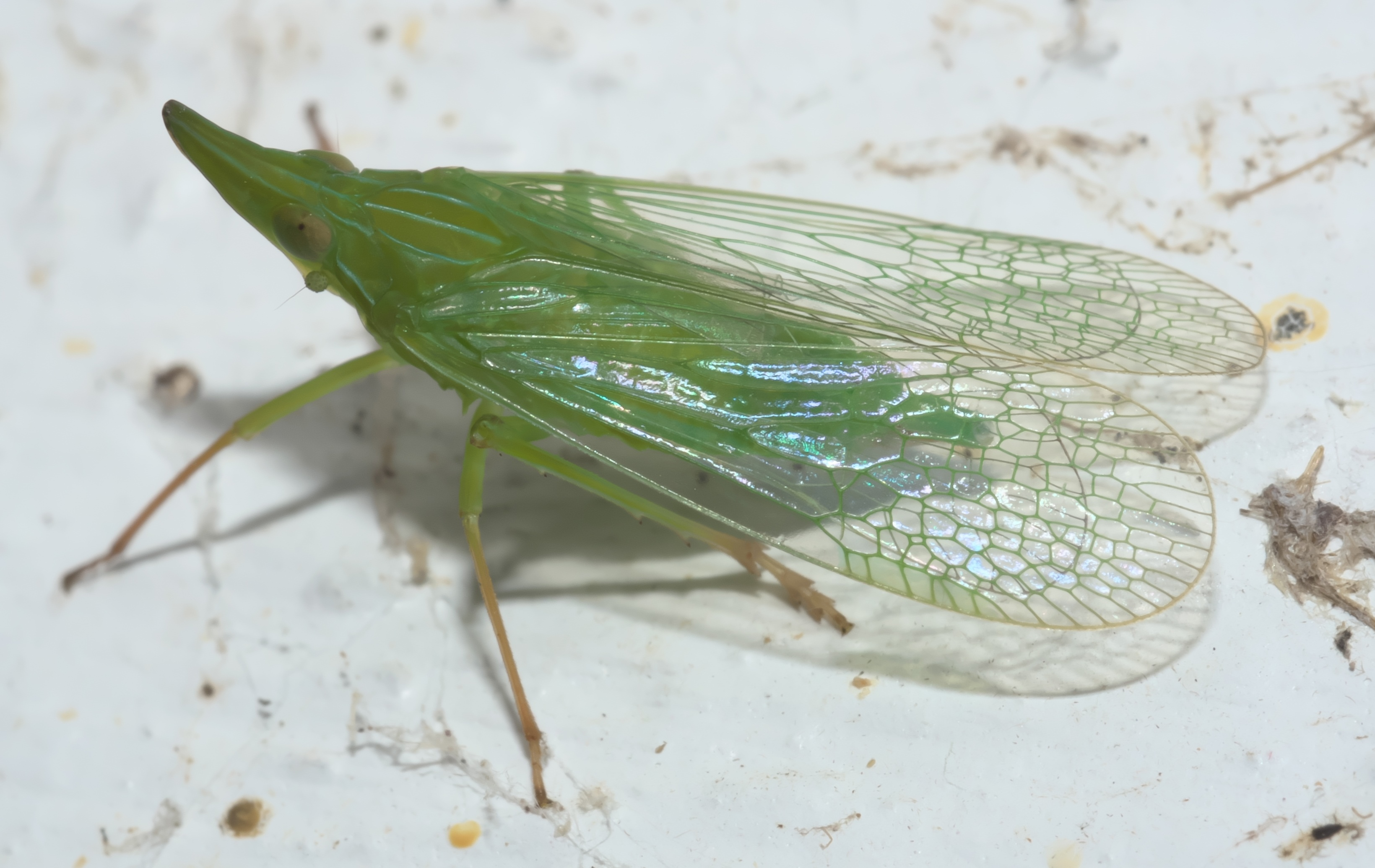
Rhynchomitra sp.

Authority: Emeljanov, 1983; distribution: Americas

1. Coronersia Emeljanov, 2011
2. Crocodictya Emeljanov, 2008
3. Deltoplana Emeljanov, 2011
4. Dictyopharoides Fowler, 1900
5. Digitocrista Fennah, 1944
6. Hyalodictyon Fennah, 1944
7. Malogava Emeljanov, 2008
8. Megadictya Melichar, 1912
9. Melicharoptera Metcalf, 1938
10. Mitrops Fennah, 1944
11. Neonotostrophia Xing & Chen, 2013^{c g}
12. Neoterpe Emeljanov, 2011^{c g}
13. Nersia Stal, 1862^{c g b}
14. Nersiella Emeljanov, 2008
15. Parahasta Melichar, 1912
16. Paralappida Melichar, 1912
17. Pharodictyon Fennah, 1944
18. Plegmatoptera Spinola, 1839
19. Pteroplegma Melichar, 1912
20. Pukuakanga Baptista, Serrão & Da-Silva, 2010
21. Retiala Fennah, 1944
22. Rhynchomitra Fennah, 1944^{c g b}
23. Sicoris Stål, 1866^{c g}
24. Taractellus Metcalf, 1948
25. Trigava O'Brien, 1999
26. Trimedia Fennah, 1944^{c g}
27. Xenochasma Emeljanov, 2011

=== Orthopagini ===
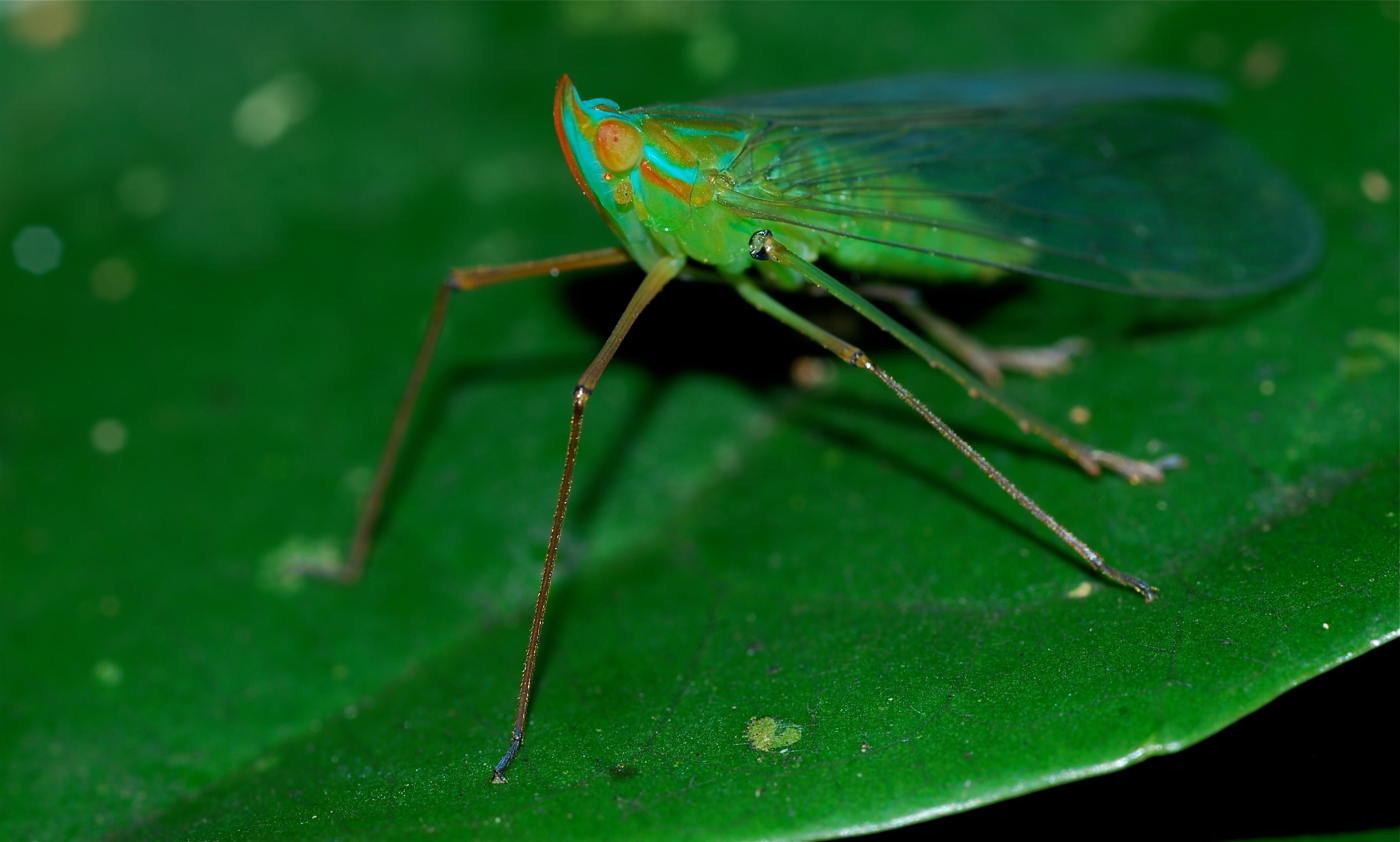
Centromeria viridistigma

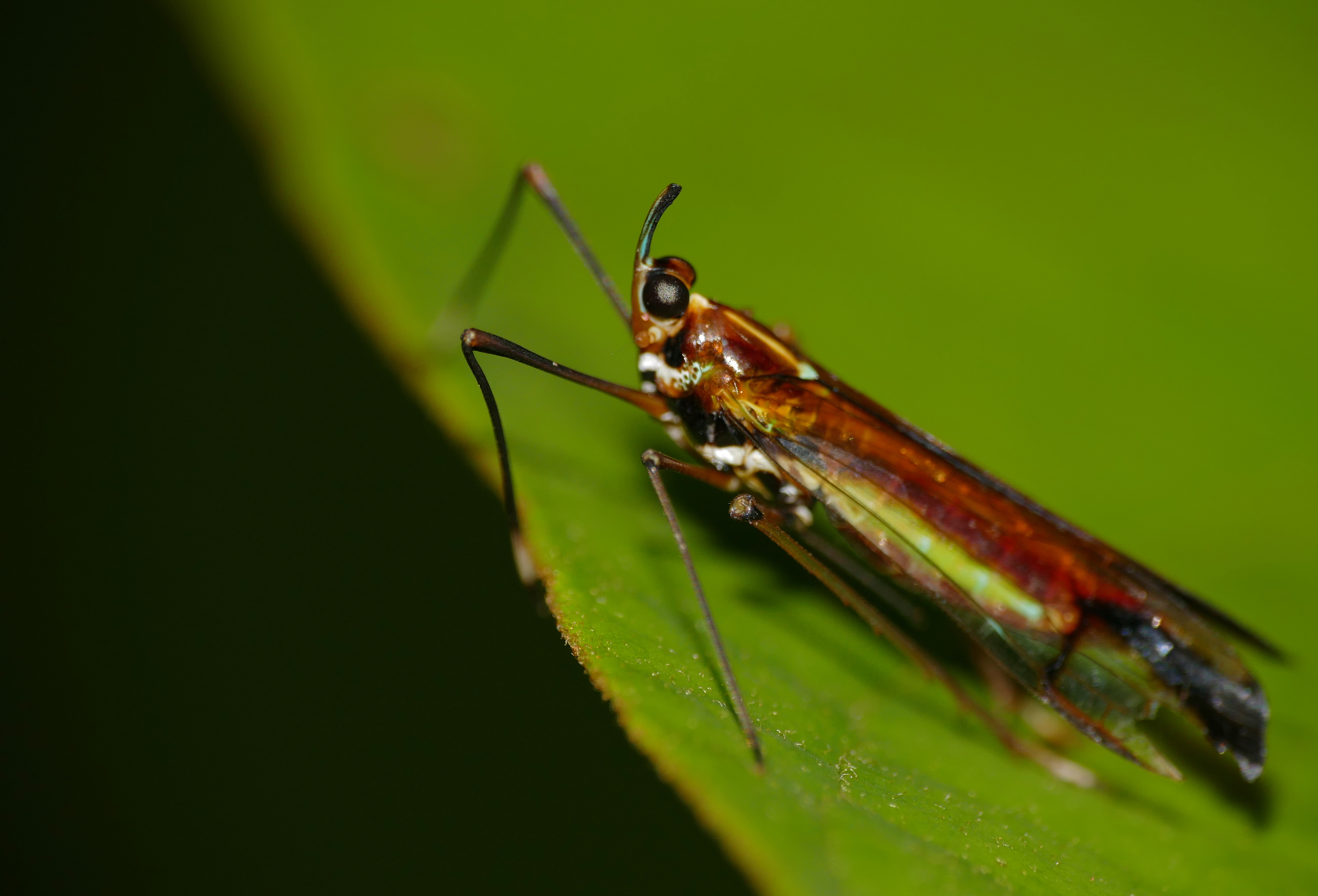
Miasa nigromaculata

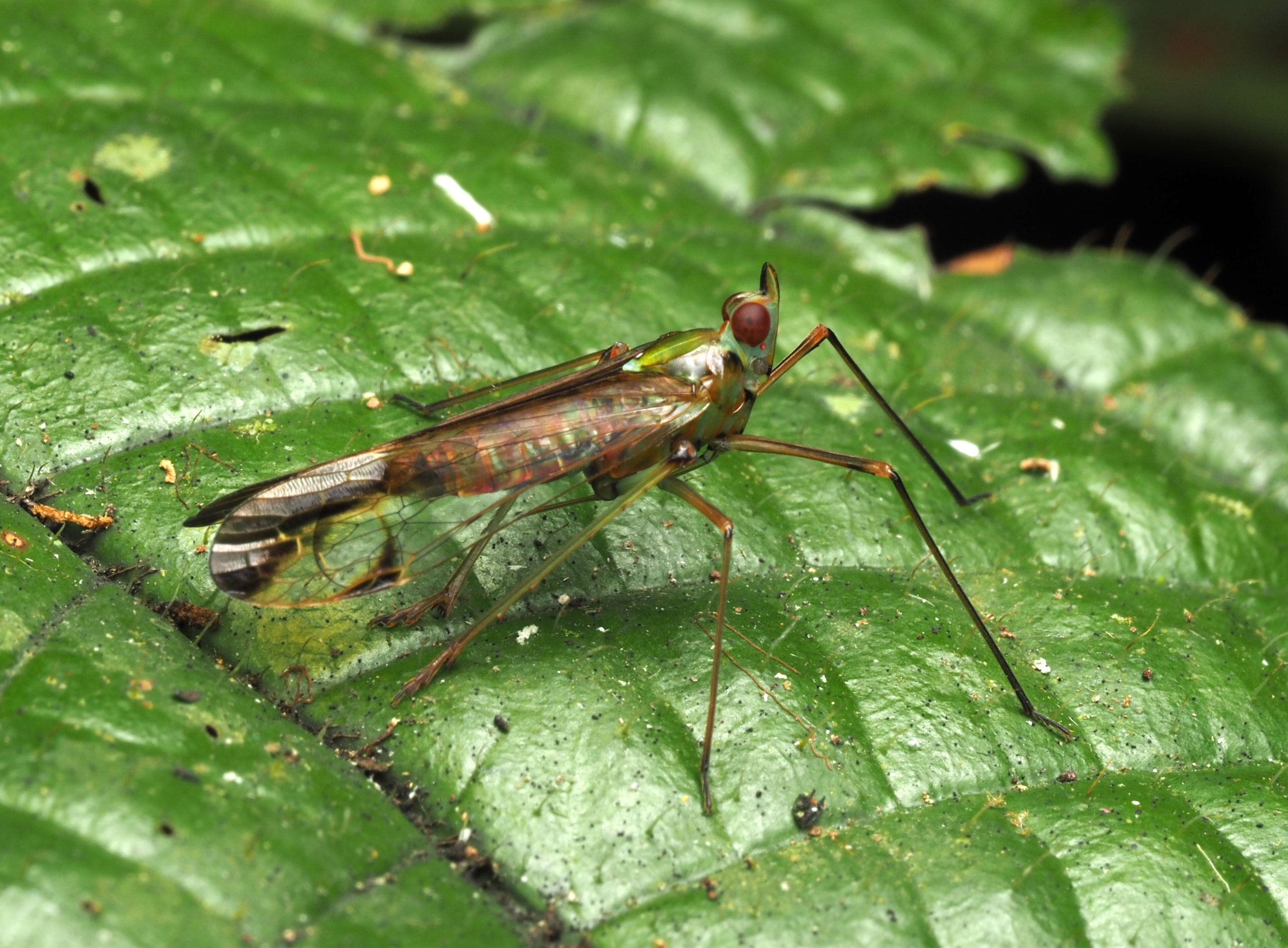
Indomiasa distanti

Authority: Emeljanov, 1983; distribution: Africa, Europe, Asia

1. Centromeria Stål, 1870
2. Centromeriana Melichar, 1912
3. Dictyomeria Song, Webb & Liang, 2016
4. Dictyopharina Melichar, 1903
5. Dictyotenguna Song & Liang^{c g}
6. Ellipoma Emeljanov, 2008
7. Fernandea Melichar, 1912
8. Indomiasa Song, Webb & Liang, 2014
9. Leprota Melichar, 1912
10. Litocras Emeljanov, 2008
11. Macronaso Synave, 1960
12. Medeusa Emeljanov, 2011
13. Metaurus Stål, 1866^{c g}
14. Miasa Distant, 1906^{c g}
15. Neonersia Song & Deckert, 2019
16. Nesolyncides Fennah, 1958
17. Orthopagus Uhler, 1896^{c g}
18. Phaenodictyon Fennah, 1958
19. Protolepta Melichar, 1912
20. Saigona Matsumura, 1910
21. Tenguna Matsumura, 1910
22. Truncatomeria Song & Liang, 2011

=== Phylloscelini ===
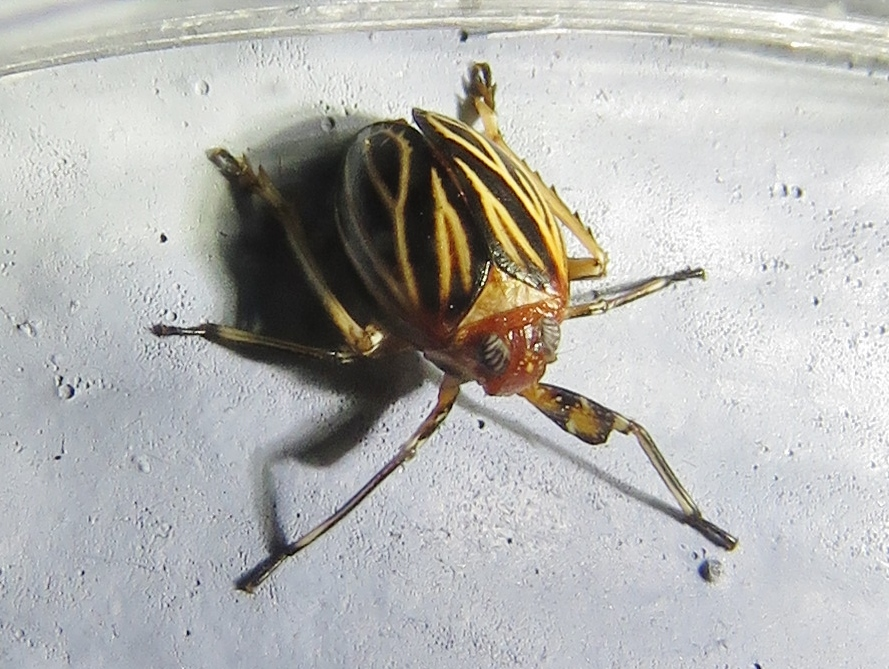
Phylloscelis atra

Authority: Emeljanov, 1983; distribution: N. America, Africa

1. Phylloscelis Germar, 1839^{c g b}

=== Rancodini ===
Authority: Emeljanov, 2014; distribution: Chile

1. Rancoda Emeljanov, 2014^{c g}

=== Scoloptini ===
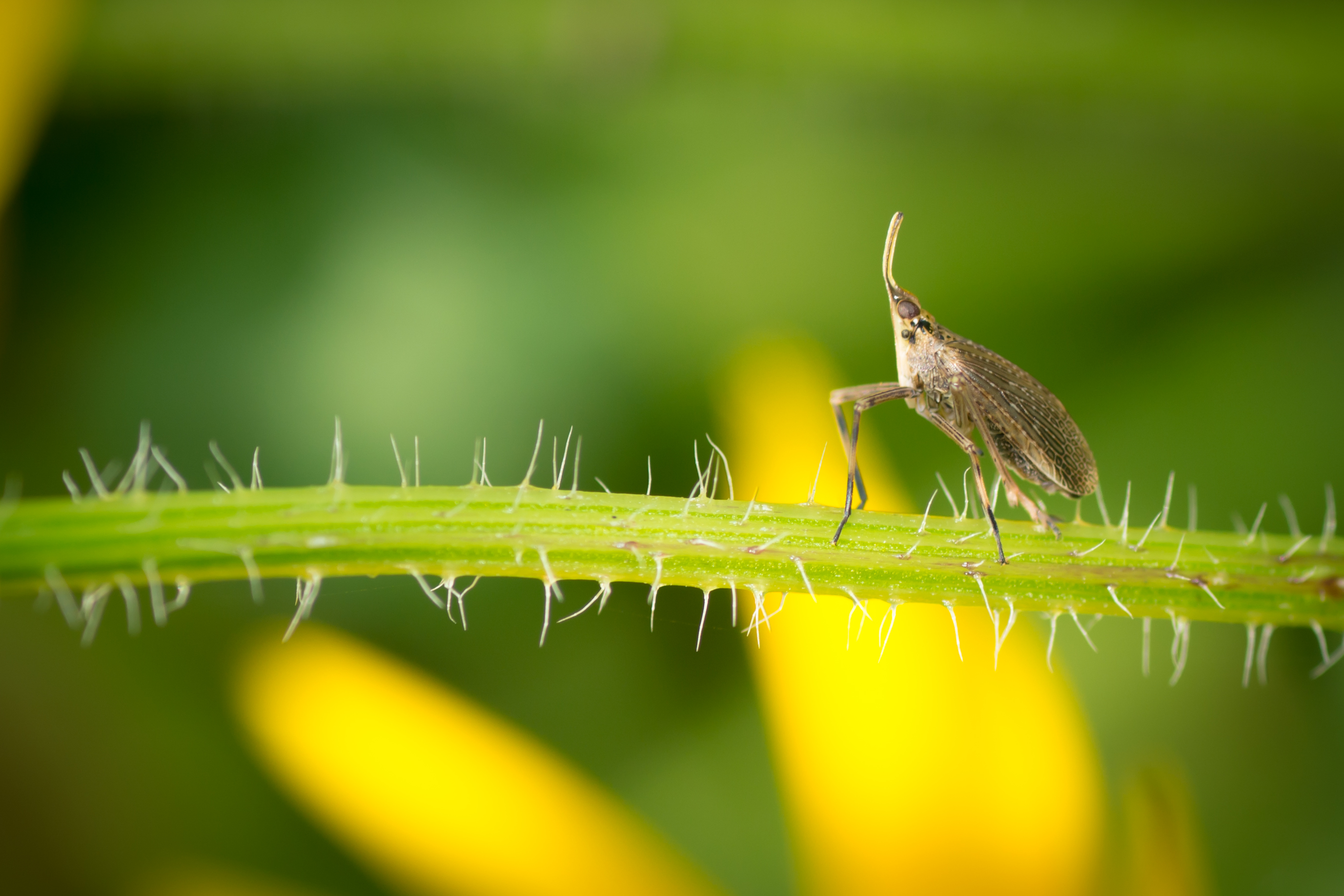
Scolops

Authority: Emeljanov, 1983; distribution: N. America

1. Scolops Schaum in Ersch & Gruber, 1850^{c g b}

=== Taosini ===
Authority: Emeljanov, 1983; distribution: Americas

1. Brachytaosa Muir, 1931
2. Cuernavaca (planthopper) Kirkaldy, 1913
3. Netaosa Emeljanov, 2011
4. Phormotegus Emeljanov, 2010
5. Sicorisia Melichar, 1912
6. Taosa Distant, 1906^{c g}

=== Genera incertae sedis ===
1. Chondrodire Emeljanov, 2011
2. Chondrophana Emeljanov, 2015
3. Mahanorona Distant, 1909
4. Viridophara Shakila, 1984

=== Extinct genera ===
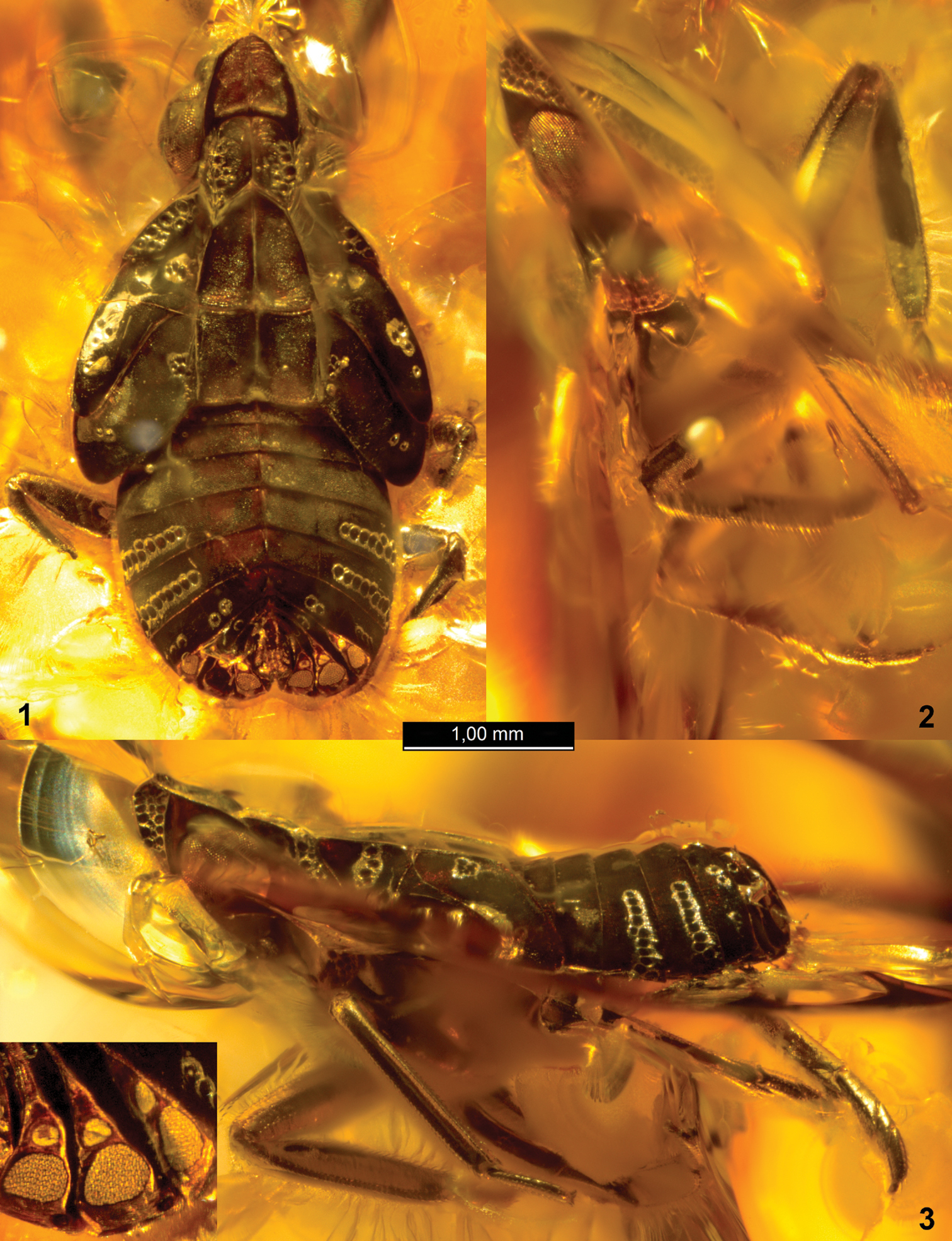
Alicodoxa rasnitsyni (extinct) in amber

- Orthopagini
1. † Alicodoxa Emeljanov & Shcherbakov, 2011
2. † Bathymyza Emeljanov & Shcherbakov, 2020
- †Netutelini Emeljanov, 1983
1. † Netutela Emeljanov, 1983
- †Worskaitini Szwedo, 2008
1. † Worskaito Szwedo, 2008

Data sources: i = ITIS, c = Catalogue of Life, g = GBIF, b = Bugguide.net
