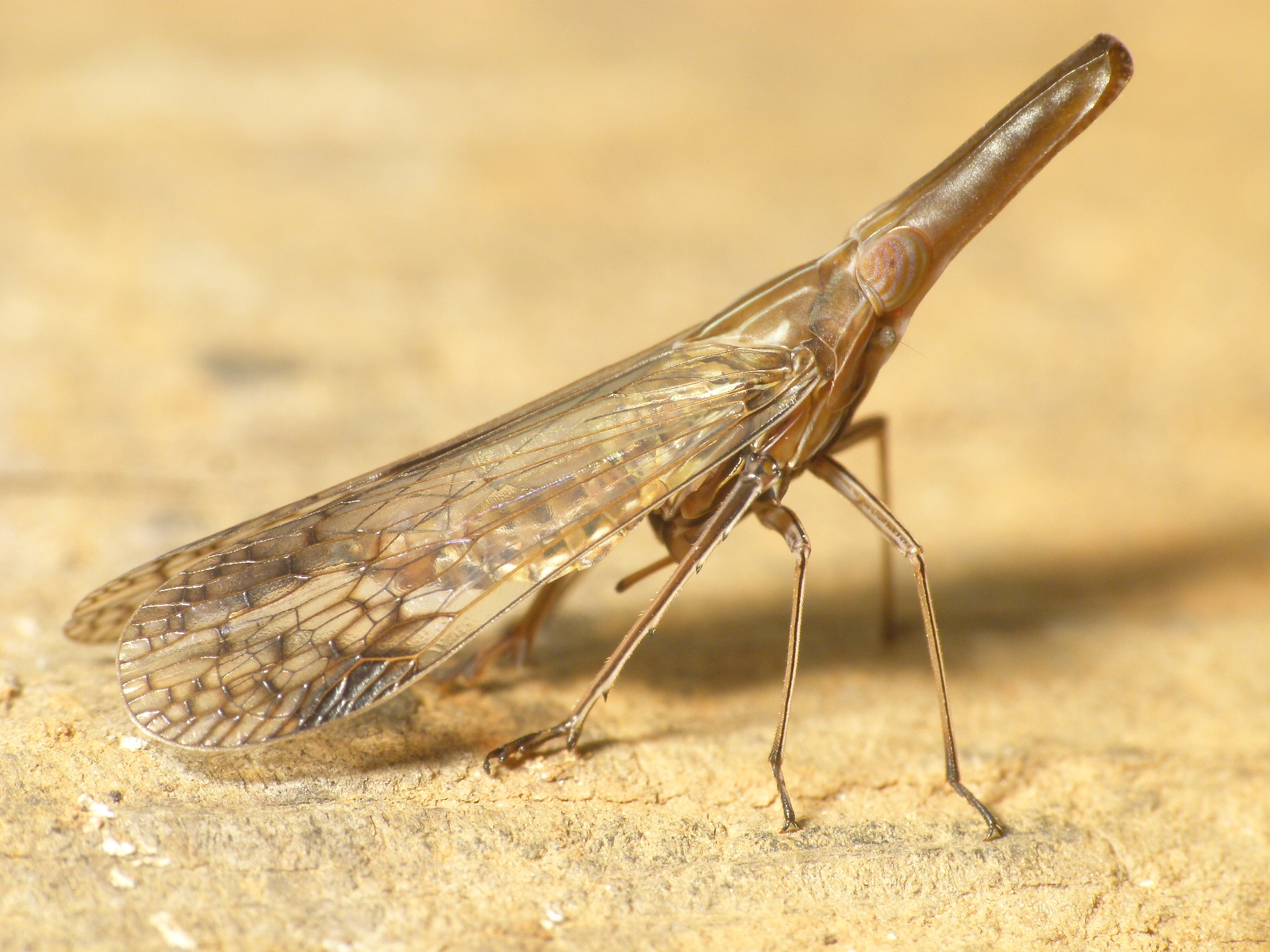
- Dictyophara species

Scientific classification
- Kingdom: Animalia
- Phylum: Arthropoda
- Clade: Pancrustacea
- Class: Insecta
- Order: Hemiptera
- Suborder: Auchenorrhyncha
- Infraorder: Fulgoromorpha
- Superfamily: Fulgoroidea
- Family: Dictyopharidae; Spinola, 1839

= Dictyopharidae =

Dictyopharidae Temporal range: Santonian - Recent

Family of planthoppers

Dictyopharidae is a family of planthoppers, related to the Fulgoridae. The family comprises nearly 760 species in more than 150 genera which are grouped into two subfamilies, Dictyopharinae and Orgeriinae.

== Description ==
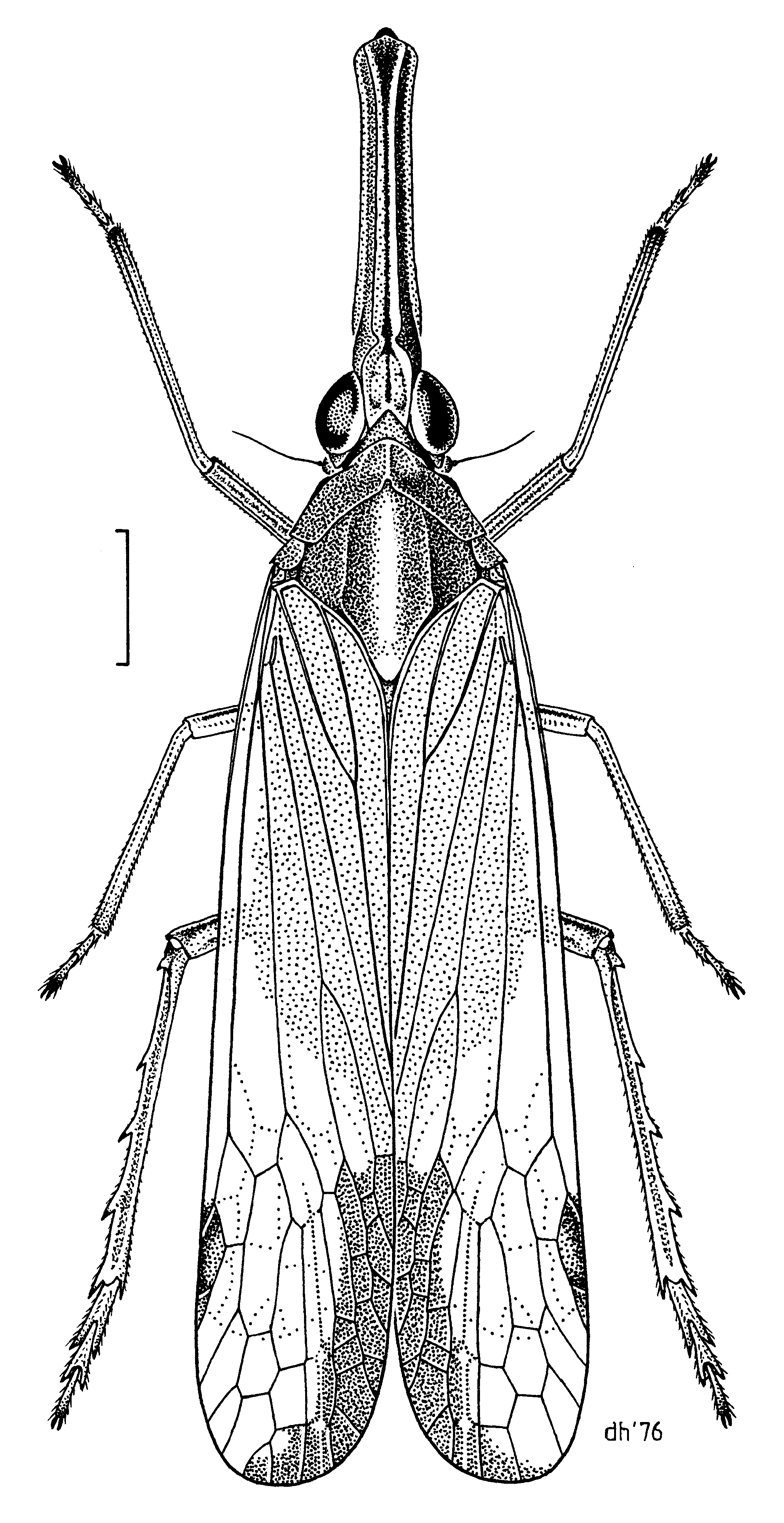
Thanatodictya tillyardi

Like all other fulgoroids, they have the antennae arising on the side of the head below the compound eye (not between the eyes as in the Cicadoidea). Many species have an elongated frons. Those that do not have this elongation may have 2 or 3 carinae (keels). The median ocellus is absent.

== Diversity ==
Genera are placed in two subfamilies:

=== Dictyopharinae ===
Authority: Onuki, 1901; selected genera include:

- Dictyophara Germar, 1833
- Dictyotenguna Song & Liang
- Miasa Distant, 1906
- Neodictya Synave, 1965
- Phylloscelis Germar, 1839
- Rhynchomitra Fennah, 1944
- Scolops Schaum, 1850
- Thanatodictya Kirkaldy, 1906

=== Orgeriinae ===
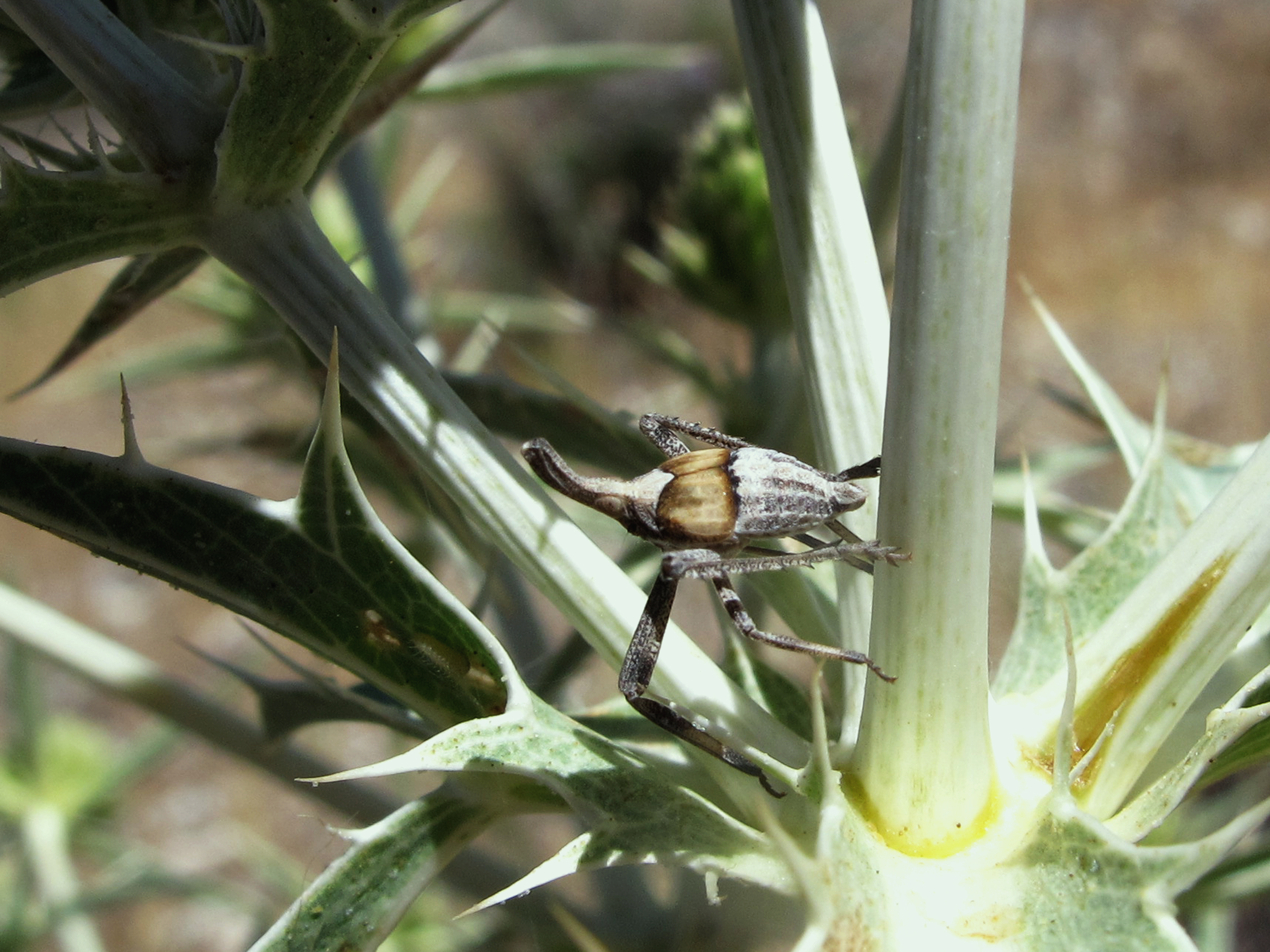
Almana longipes

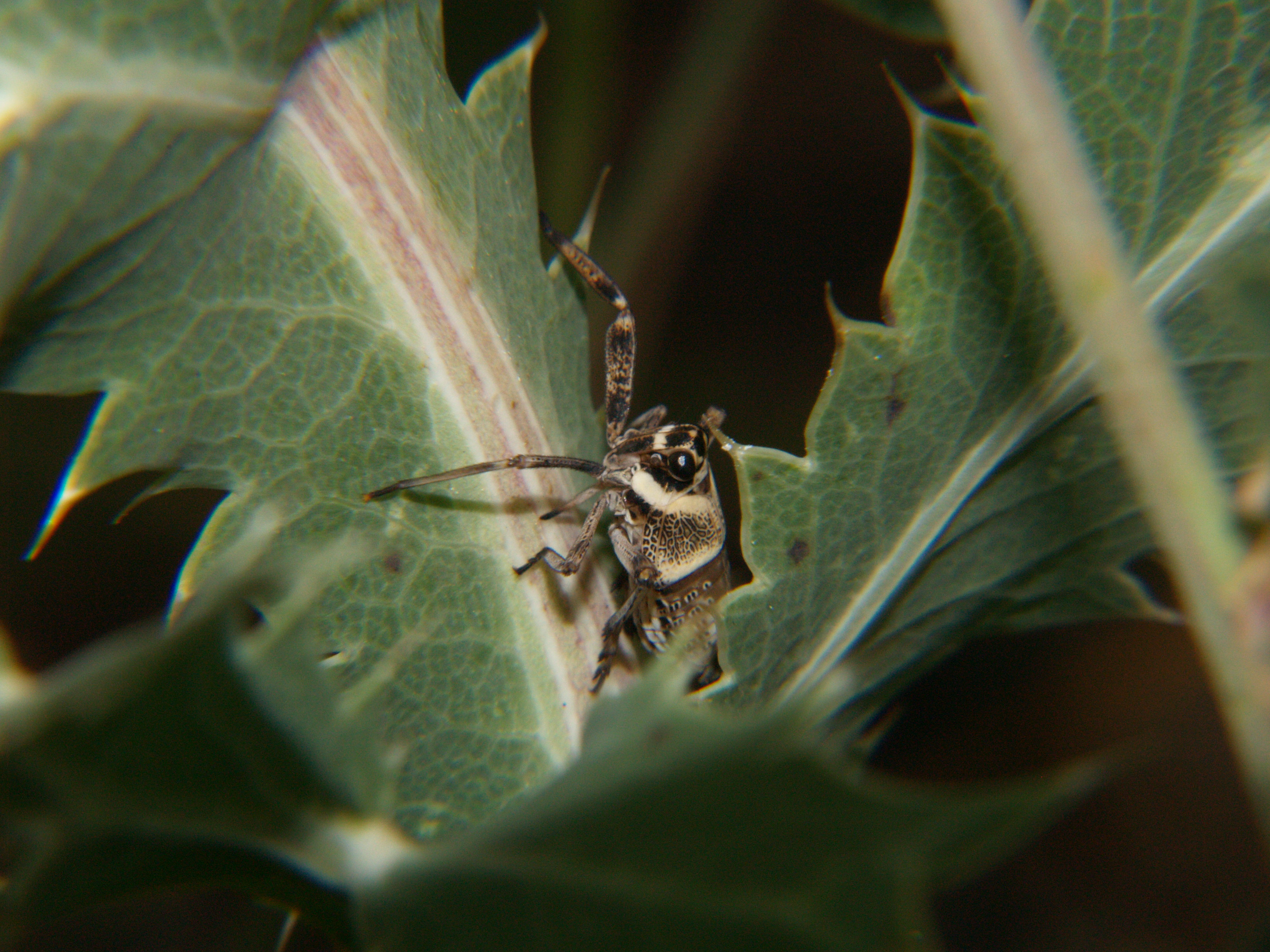
Parorgerius platypus

Authority: Fieber, 1872; the following genera, in four tribes, are included by BioLib.cz:

Almanini Kusnetzov, 1936

1. Almana Stål, 1861
2. Bursinia A. Costa, 1862
3. Cnodalum Emeljanov, 1978
4. Coppa Emeljanov, 1969
5. Coppidius Emeljanov, 1969
6. Haumavarga Oshanin, 1908
7. Iphicara Emeljanov, 1978
8. Mesorgerius Kusnezov, 1933
9. Nymphorgerius Oshanin, 1913
10. Orgamarella Emeljanov, 1969
11. Parorgerioides Bergevin, 1928
12. Scirtophaca Emeljanov, 1969
13. Sphenarchus Emeljanov, 2003
14. Tachorga Emeljanov, 1969
15. Tigrahauda Oshanin, 1908
16. Tilimontia Emeljanov, 1969

Colobocini Emeljanov, 1969

1. Colobocus Emeljanov, 1969

Orgeriini Fieber, 1872

1. Acinaca Ball & Hartzell, 1922
2. Almanetta Emeljanov, 1999
3. Aridia Ball & Hartzell, 1922
4. Austrorgerius Woodward, 1960
5. Deserta Ball & Hartzell, 1922
6. Orgamara Ball, 1909
7. Orgerius Stål, 1859
8. Ticida Uhler, 1891
9. Ticrania Emeljanov, 2006
10. Timonidia Ball & Hartzell, 1922
11. Yucanda Ball & Hartzell, 1922
12. Kumlika Oshanin, 1912
13. Ototettix Oshanin, 1912

Ranissini Emeljanov, 1969

1. Elysiaca Emeljanov, 1969
2. Parorgerius Melichar, 1912
3. Phyllorgerius Kusnezov, 1928
4. Ranissus Fieber, 1866
5. Sphenocratus Horváth, 1910

=== Unplaced and fossil taxa ===
The following genera are incertae sedis:

- Mitropodes Baptista, Ferreira & Da-Silva, 2006
- Mozzela Baptista, Ferreira & Da-Silva, 2006

A number of species are known from the fossil record, which reaches back to the Santonian age of the Late Cretaceous. The oldest fossil, Netutela annunciator belonging to the extinct dictyopharine tribe Netutelini, was described from Taymyr amber on the Taymyr Peninsula of Russia. Younger amber fossils include the amber genus Alicodoxa described from Eocene Baltic and Rovno ambers Compression fossil species include the Ypresian Limfjordia breineri from the Fur Formation in Denmark and the Priabonian Florissantia elegans from the Florissant Formation, Colorado.
