= 1975 in paleontology =

Paleontology or palaeontology is the study of prehistoric life forms on Earth through the examination of plant and animal fossils. This includes the study of body fossils, tracks (ichnites), burrows, cast-off parts, fossilised feces (coprolites), palynomorphs and chemical residues. Because humans have encountered fossils for millennia, paleontology has a long history both before and after becoming formalized as a science. This article records significant discoveries and events related to paleontology that occurred or were published in the year 1975.

== Paleozoology ==
=== Arthropods ===
==== Insects ====
Name	Novelty	Status	Authors	Age	Unit	Location	Notes	Images
Cretopone	Gen et sp nov	Valid	Dlussky	Turonian	Beleutinskaya Formation	Kazakhstan	An ant of uncertain phylogenetic placement. Type species C. magna	Cretopone magna
Electrodryinus areolatus	gen et sp nov	jr synonym	Ponomarenko	Eocene	Baltic amber	Russia	A dryinid wasp, genus synonymized with Deinodryinus	Deinodryinus areolatus
"Palaeomyrmex"	Gen et sp nov.	Jr synonym	Dlussky	Santonian	Taimyr amber	Russia	A Sphecomyrminae ant. homonym of Palaeomyrmex Heer. Moved to Dlusskyidris zherichini	Dlusskyidris zherichini

=== Molluscs ===
==== Bivalves ====
Name	Novelty	Status	Authors	Age	Unit	Location	Notes	Images
Fordillidae	fam nov	Valid	Pojeta	Lower Devonian	worldwide		New family for Fordilla and Pojetaia	Fordilla

=== Conodonts ===
German paleontologist and stratigrapher Heinz Walter Kozur (1942-2013) and G.K. Merrill described the conodont genus Diplognathodus.

=== Vertebrates ===
==== Dinosaurs ====
===== Newly named dinosaurs =====
Data courtesy of George Olshevsky's dinosaur genera list.

Name	Novelty	Status	Authors	Age	Unit	Location	Notes	Images
Abrictosaurus	gen nov	Valid	Hopson	Early Jurassic	Upper Elliot Formation	Lesotho		Abrictosaurus
Alocodon	Gen et sp nov	Valid		194 Millions years ago.		Portugal; UK		
Bagaceratops	Gen et sp nov	Valid	Maryańska & Osmólska	Late Cretaceous		Mongolia		Bagaceratops
"Sinopliosaurus" fusuiensis	Sp. Nov.	junior synonym?	Lian-Hai, Hsiang-K'uei, & Xi-Jin	Early Cretaceous	Xinlong Formation	China	Originally classified as a second species of the pliosauroid Sinopliosaurus, and later as a spinosaurid dinosaur. Now a possible junior synonym of the spinosaurid genus Siamosaurus.	"Sinopliosaurus" fusuiensis
Barapasaurus	Gen et sp nov	Valid	Jain, Kutty, Roy-Chowdhury, & Chatterjee	Lower Jurassic	Kota Formation	India		Barapasaurus
Bradycneme	Fam, gen, et sp nov	Nomen dubium	Harrison & C. A. Walker	Maastrichtian	Sânpetru Formation	Romania	Possibly synonymous with Elopteryx.	
Heptasteornis	gen et sp nov	Valid	Harrison & C. A. Walker	Maastrichtian	Sânpetru Formation	Romania	alvarezsaurid, originally described as an owl	
Lanasaurus	Gen nov	Valid	Gow	Hettangian to Sinemurian	Elliot Formation	South Africa		
"Yubasaurus"		Nomen nudum.	He				informal name for Yandusaurus.	

===== Newly named birds =====
Name	Novelty	Status	Authors	Age	Unit	Location	Notes	Images
Anhinga grandis	Sp. nov.	Valid	Larry D. Martin Robert M. Mengel	Pliocene	Kimball Formation	USA (Florida)	An Anhingidae.	
Botaurus hibbardi	Sp. nov.	Valid	Carolyn Moseley Alan Feduccia	Late Pliocene	Rexroad Formation	USA (Kansas)	An Ardeidae.	
Bulweria bifax	Sp. nov.	Valid	Storrs L. Olson	Holocene		Saint Helena	A Procellariidae, Extinct after 1502 arrival of man	
Dakotornis cooperi	Gen. et Sp. nov.	Valid	Bruce R. Erickson	Paleocene	Tongue River Formation	USA (North Dakota)	Described in the Dakornithidae, now placed in the Graculavidae, this is the type species of the new genus.	
Dysmoropelia dekarchiskos	Gen. et Sp. nov.	Valid	Storrs L. Olson	Middle Pleistocene-Holocene		Saint Helena	A Columbidae, this is the type species of the new genus.	
Falco antiquus	Sp. nov.	Valid	Cécile Mourer-Chauviré	Middle Pleistocene	MQ 2B	France	A Falconidae.	
Nannococcyx spix	Gen. et Sp. nov.	Valid	Storrs L. Olson	Holocene		Saint Helena	A Cuculidae, this is the type species of the new genus. Extinct at the start of the 16th century BC	
Primapus lacki	Gen. et Sp. nov.	Valid	Collin J. O. Harrison Cyril A. Walker	Early Eocene	London Clay, MP 8-9	UK	An Apodiformes, Aegialornithidae Lydekker, 1891.	
Pterodroma rupinarum	Sp. nov.	Valid	Storrs L. Olson	Late Pleistocene-Holocene		Saint Helena	A Procellariidae, sometimes placed in the genus Pseudobulweria. Extinct after 1502 due to deforestation	
Puffinus pacificoides	Sp. nov.	Valid	Storrs L. Olson	Pleistocene		Saint Helena	A Procellariidae.	
Spizaetus schultzi	Sp. nov.	Valid	Larry D. Martin	Pliocene, Kimballian	Kimball Formation	USA (Florida)	An Accipitridae.	
Upupa antaios	Sp. nov.	Valid	Storrs L. Olson	Holocene		Saint Helena	An Upupidae. Extinct before or around 1502	

==== Pterosaurs ====
===== New taxa =====
Name	Status	Authors	Location	Notes
Puntanipterus	Valid	Bonaparte Sanchez, T.M		
Quetzalcoatlus	Valid	Lawson, Douglas A.	USA(Texas) Canada(Alberta)	Quetzalcoatlus

==== Incertae sedis ====
===== New taxa =====
Name	Status	Authors	Notes
Gluteus minimus	Valid	Richard Arnold Davis & Holmes A. Semken, Jr.	
