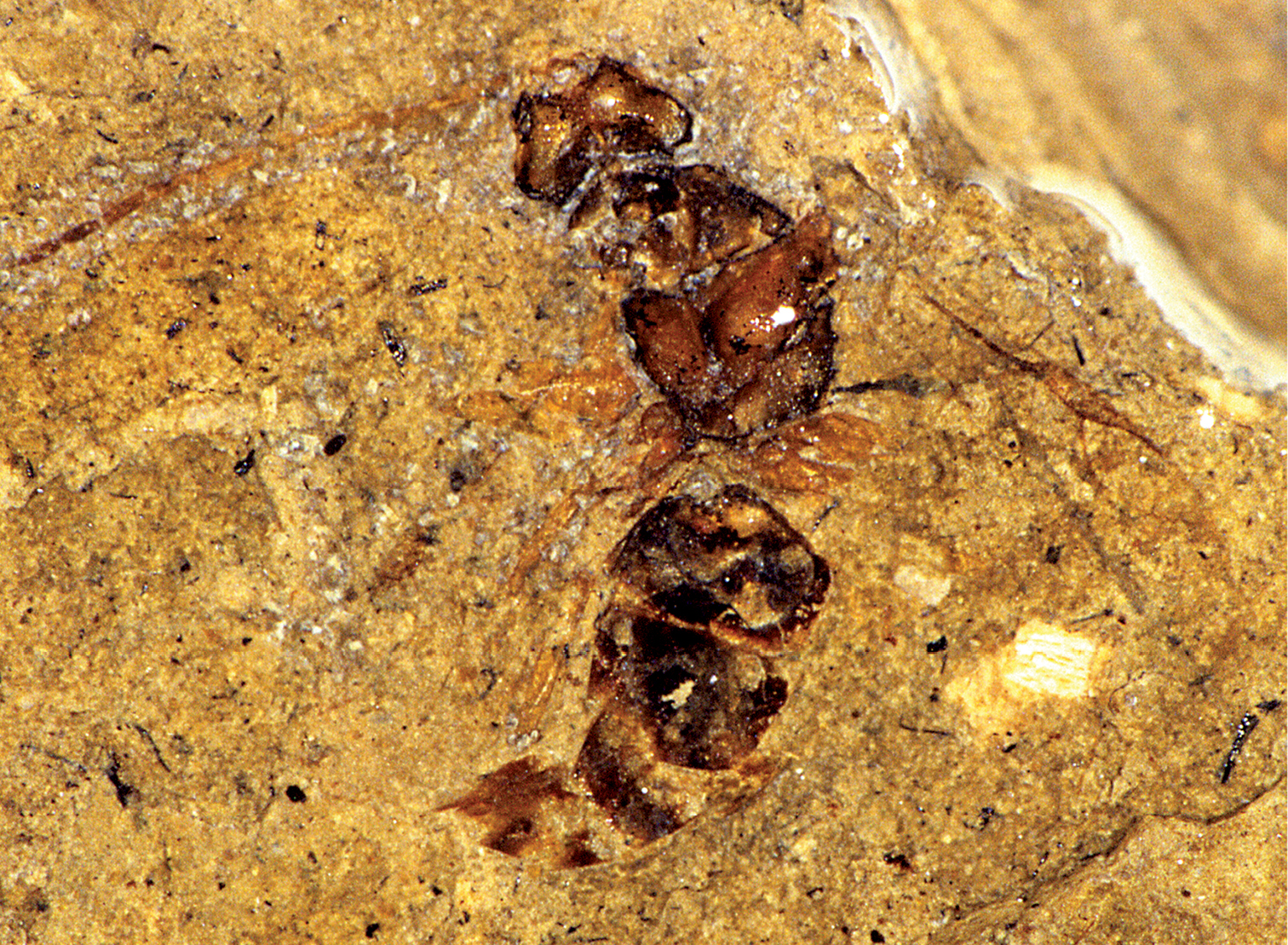

Scientific classification
- Domain: Eukaryota
- Kingdom: Animalia
- Phylum: Arthropoda
- Class: Insecta
- Order: Hymenoptera
- Family: Dryinidae
- Subfamily: Anteoninae
- Genus: Deinodryinus (?)
- Species: †D.? aptianus

Binomial name
- †Deinodryinus? aptianus Olmi, Rasnitsyn & Guglielmino, 2010

= Deinodryinus? aptianus =

Deinodryinus? aptianus Temporal range: Aptian

Extinct species of wasp

Deinodryinus? aptianus is an extinct species of Deinodryinus in the wasp family Dryinidae. The species is solely known from a Cretaceous fossil found in Mongolia.

== History and classification ==
Deinodryinus? aptianus is known only from a single fossil, the holotype, specimen number PIN No. 3559/4586, which is housed in the A.A. Borissiak Palaeontological Institute, Russian Academy of Sciences in Russia. The specimen is composed of a partially complete adult female wasp. The specimen is preserved as a compression fossil in marl. The fossil was recovered from outcrops of possibly Aptian age rocks found in bed 8 of Outcrop 87 of the Khurilt rock unit near Bon Tsagan Nuur Lake in Central Mongolia. Deinodryinus? aptianus was first studied by the paleoentomologists Adalgisa Guglielmino and Massimo Olmi both of the University of Tuscia in collaboration with Alexandr Rasnitsyn of the Paleontological Institute, Russian Academy of Sciences. Their 2010 type description of the new genus and species was published in the online journal Zootaxa. Deinodryinus? aptianus is one of three Deinodryinus species to be described from the fossil record and the only one to be described from a compression fossil. Both Deinodryinus areolatus and Deinodryinus velteni are known from fossils preserved in Baltic amber. Due to the incomplete nature of the fossil and Ventral positioning of the specimen in the marl, placement into the genus Deinodryinus is considered tentative until more specimens are found.

== Description ==
The holotype specimen is an adult female preserved with the ventral side visible and portions of the legs missing. Overall the female is 6.2 millimetres (0.24 in) in length, with 3.06-millimetre (0.120 in) long antennae and macropterous hyaline wings. The antennae are composed of ten segments and distinctly filiform in structure, a feature seen in females of only two other Deinodryinus species, Deinodryinus benoiti of Madagascar and Deinodryinus colombianus of South America. The forewings have three cells at the base that are formed by pigmented veins. The forewings have a very long and narrow pterostigma and a stigmal vein that is regularly curved. While the stigmal vein and pterostigma are both typical for members of Deinodryinus, the filiform antennae are unusual and raise doubts about the placement.
