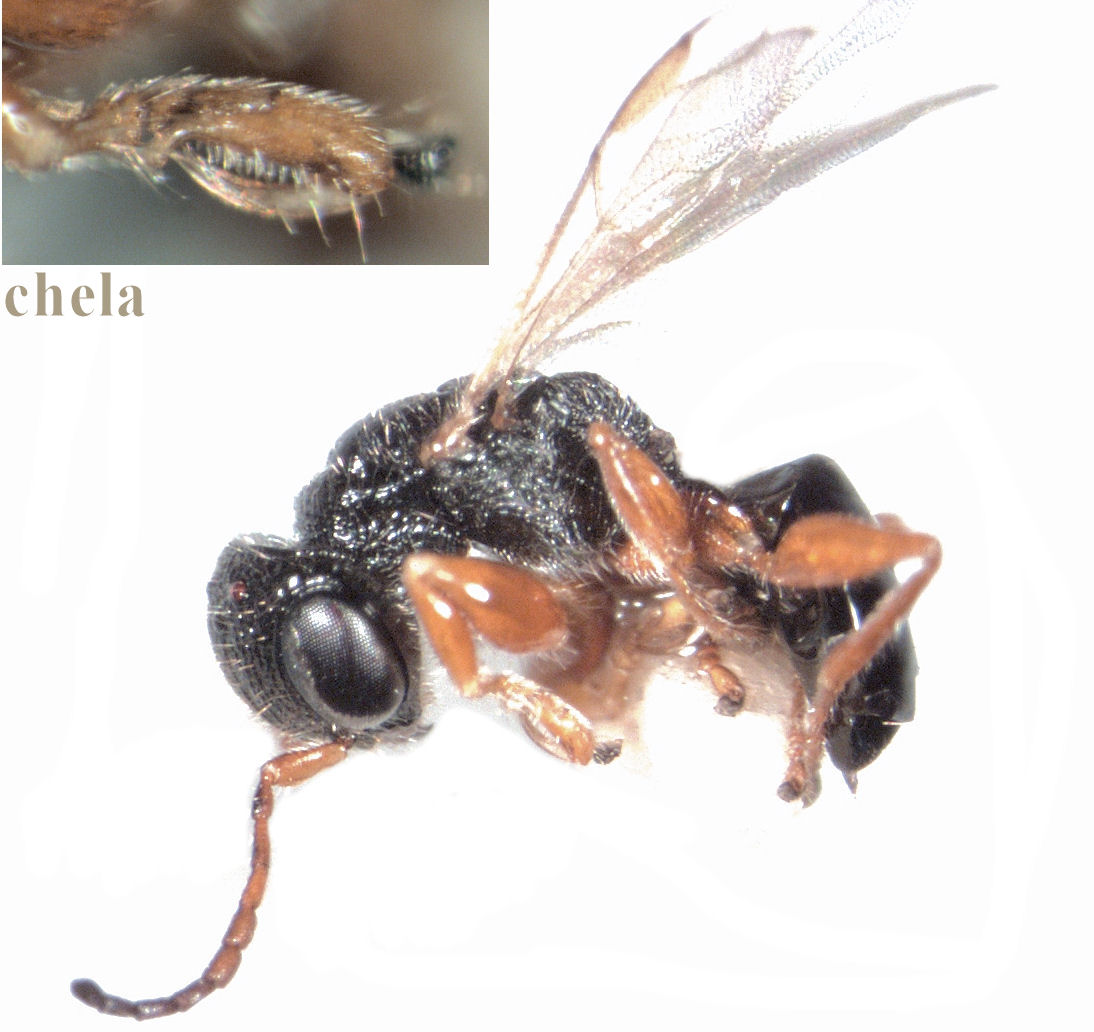
- Anteon caledonianum (female)

Scientific classification
- Domain: Eukaryota
- Kingdom: Animalia
- Phylum: Arthropoda
- Class: Insecta
- Order: Hymenoptera
- Family: Dryinidae
- Subfamily: Anteoninae
- Genus: Anteon; Jurine, 1807

Type species
- Anteon jurineanum Latreille, 1809

Species
- See text

= Anteon =

Genus of insects

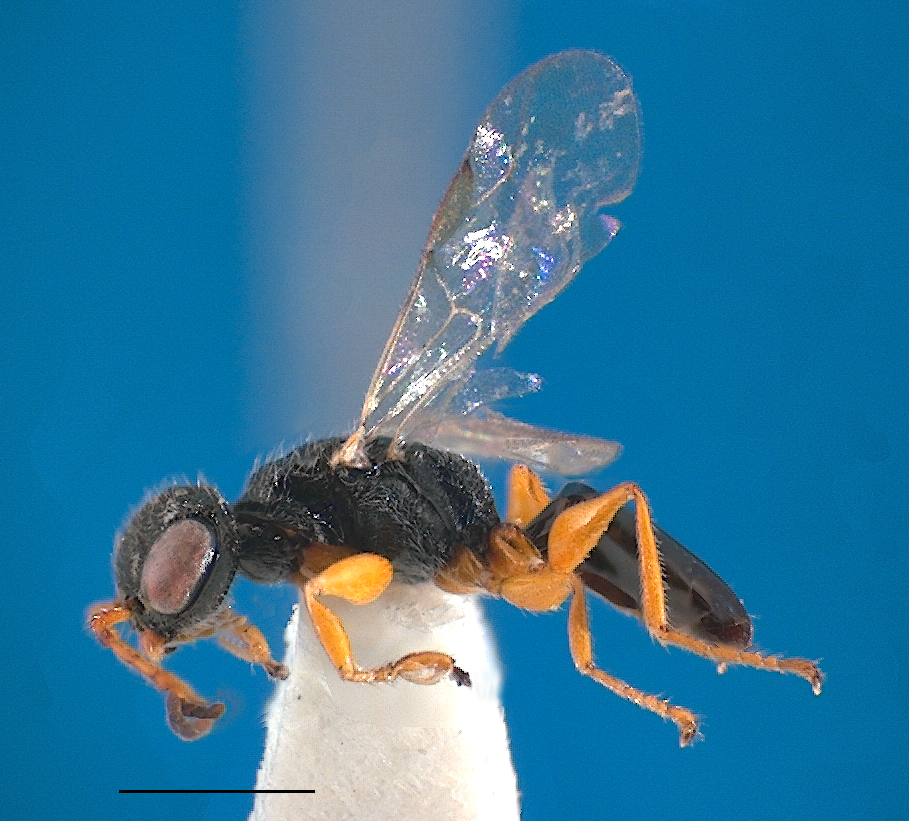
Anteon caledonianum

Anteon is the largest genus in the subfamily Anteoninae of the family Dryinidae, it occurs globally and there is a current total of 464 species described. The species in the genus Anteon are parasitoids of leafhoppers from the family Cicadellidae. The female wasps of the family Dryinidae almost always possess a chelate protarsus, as do females of species within Anteon. The chelae are used to capture and immobilise the host leafhopper to allow the wasp to oviposit and feed on it.

== Species ==
The following species are among those included in the genus Anteon:

- Anteon agile Olmi, 1984
- Anteon abdulnouri Olmi, 1987
- Anteon arcuatum Kieffer 1905
- Anteon borneanum Olmi, 1984
- Anteon brachycerum (Dalman, 1823)
- Anteon caledonianum Olmi, 1984
- Anteon ephippiger (Dalman, 1818)
- Anteon exiguum (Haupt, 1941)
- Anteon faciale (Thomson, 1860)
- Anteon flavicorne (Dalman, 1818)
- Anteon fulviventre (Haliday, 1828)
- Anteon gaullei Kieffer, 1905
- Anteon huettingeri Olmi, Xu & Guglielmino, 2015
- Anteon infectum (Haliday, 1837)
- Anteon insertum Olmi, 1991
- Anteon jurineanum Latreille, 1809
- Anteon krombeini Olmi, 1984
- Anteon maritimum (Turner, 1928)
- Anteon pinetellum De Rond, 1998
- Anteon pubicorne (Dalman, 1818)
- Anteon reticulatum Kieffer, 1905
- Anteon scapulare (Haliday, 1837)
- Anteon sarawaki Olmi, 1984
- Anteon thai Olmi, 1984
- Anteon tripartitum (Kieffer, 1905)
- Anteon xericum Olmi & van Harten, 2006
- Anteon yasumatsui Olmi, 1984
- Anteon zairense Benoit, 1951
- Anteon zambianum Olmi, 2008
- Anteon zimbabwense Olmi, 2005
