= Thaumatodryinus tuukkaraski =

Scientific classification
- Kingdom: Animalia
- Phylum: Arthropoda
- Class: Insecta
- Order: Hymenoptera
- Family: Dryinidae
- Genus: Thaumatodryinus
- Species: T. tuukkaraski

Binomial name
- Thaumatodryinus tuukkaraski Olmi, Copeland & Guglielmino, 2015

Species of insect

Thaumatodryinus tuukkaraski is a wasp species in the family Dryinidae. This tiny insect is endemic to Kenya where it is only known from the Taita Hills. In 2015, this newly discovered species was named in direct reference to former Boston Bruins (NHL) goaltender, Tuukka Rask.

== Etymology ==
The specific name tuukkaraski is in direct reference to the Boston Bruins (NHL) goaltender, Tuukka Rask. The reasoning given by the authors was that "[t]his species is named after the acrobatic goaltender for the Finnish National ice hockey team and the Boston Bruins, whose glove hand is as tenacious as the raptorial fore tarsus of this dryinid species”.

== Distribution and ecology ==
The species was described based on a single specimen collected with a Malaise trap at 2,162 m (7,093 ft) above sea level in Vuria Forest, Taita Hills, just inside an indigenous forest. Its ecology, including the host species, is otherwise unknown.

Thaumatodryinus tuukkaraski is only known from the Taita Hills in Kenya

== Description ==
The species description is based on a single female, the holotype, now stored in the collections of the National Museums of Kenya. The first pair of legs have enlarged claws referred to in the naming of this species. However, the claw is still tiny, less than 0.4 mm (0.016 in) long, as Thaumatodryinus tuukkaraski is a small species measuring only 3.4 mm (0.13 in) in length. The occipital carina is incomplete. The antennae are clavate. The wings are fully developed; the forewings have a transverse band whereas the hindwings are hyaline. The body is mostly black, with some testaceous or brown parts. The legs are testaceous-whitish except for the clubs of femora that are brown.
