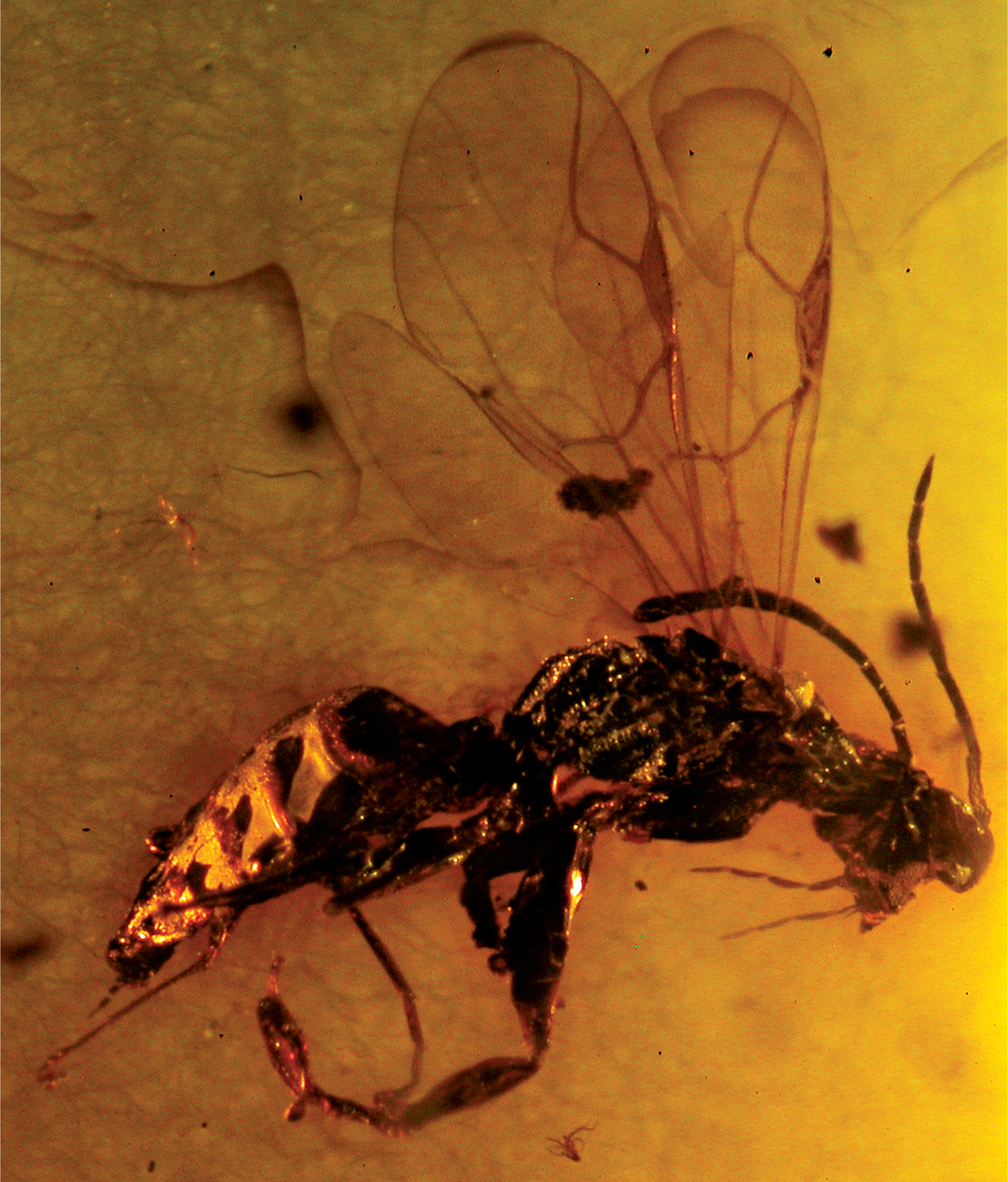

Scientific classification
- Domain: Eukaryota
- Kingdom: Animalia
- Phylum: Arthropoda
- Class: Insecta
- Order: Hymenoptera
- Family: Dryinidae
- Genus: Deinodryinus
- Species: †D. velteni

Binomial name
- †Deinodryinus velteni Guglielmino & Olmi, 2011

= Deinodryinus velteni =

Deinodryinus velteni Temporal range: Eocene

Extinct species of insect

Deinodryinus velteni is an extinct species of Deinodryinus in the wasp family Dryinidae. The species is known solely from an Eocene fossil found in the Baltic region.

== History and classification ==
Deinodryinus velteni is known only from a single fossil, the holotype, an unnumbered specimen which is housed in the Paläontologie–Sektion Bernstein of the State Museum of Natural History Stuttgart in Germany. The specimen is a fully complete adult female wasp. The specimen is preserved as an inclusion in a transparent chunk of amber. The amber dates to between forty and forty-five million years old, and, being Baltic amber that has been redistributed by the sea, a more specific type location than the Baltic region is not possible to identify. Deinodryinus velteni was first studied by paleoentomologists Adalgisa Guglielmino and Massimo Olmi, both of the University of Tuscia. Guglielmino and Olmi's 2011 type description of the new species was published in the online journal ZooKeys. The specific epithet velteni is in honor of Jürgen Velten who loaned the authors specimens that they studied. D. velteni is the most recent of three Deinodryinus species to be described from the fossil record: Deinodryinus areolatus is also known from a fossil preserved in Baltic amber, while Deinodryinus? aptianus is known only from a Mongolian compression fossil in marl.

== Description ==
The holotype specimen is a complete adult female with an overall coloration that is brown to black, except the palpi, which are a dull brick red. The female is 4.0 millimetres (0.16 in) in length, with antennae that are approximately three times the length of the head and macropterous forewings. The antennae are composed of ten segments, densely hairy, and distinctly club-shaped (clavate) in structure. The forewings have three cells at the base that are formed by pigmented veins. The forewings have a pterostigma which is approximately five times as long as it is wide, and a stigmal vein that is not S-shaped. Both the fore and hind wings are uniformly slightly darkened, rather than the glassy hyaline seen in the other two described fossil species of Deinodryinus. The length of the stigmal vein is used to separate D. areolatus and D. velteni, with the distal portion of the vein being much longer than the proximal portion in D. velteni as opposed to D. areolatus where the two portions are approximately the same length.
