= Mystrophorus =

Scientific classification
- Kingdom: Animalia
- Phylum: Arthropoda
- Class: Insecta
- Order: Hymenoptera
- Family: Dryinidae
- Genus: Mystrophorus; Förster, 1856

Genus of insects

Mystrophorus is a genus of insects belonging to the family Dryinidae.

The species of this genus are found in Europe.

Species:

- Mystrophorus apterus Ponomarenko, 2000
- Mystrophorus formicaeformis Ruthe, 1859
