= Gonatopus =

Gonatopus may refer to:

- Gonatopus (wasp), a genus of wasps in the family Dryinidae
- Gonatopus (plant), a genus of plants in the family Araceae
