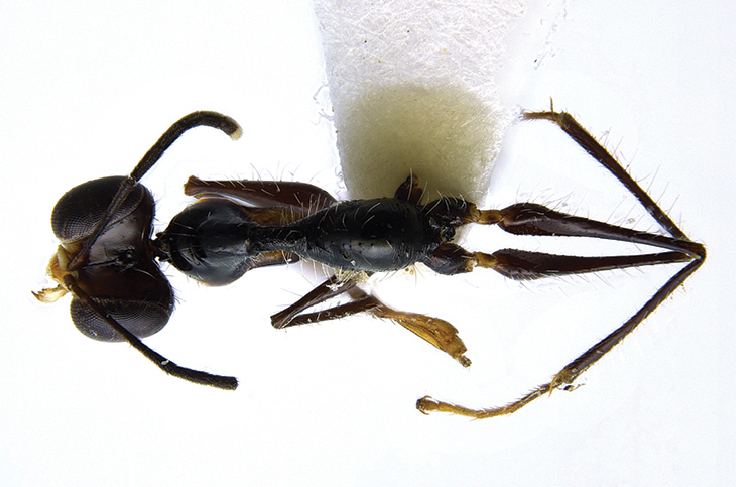
- Gonatopus jacki

Scientific classification
- Kingdom: Animalia
- Phylum: Arthropoda
- Clade: Pancrustacea
- Class: Insecta
- Order: Hymenoptera
- Family: Dryinidae
- Genus: Gonatopus
- Species: G. jacki

Binomial name
- Gonatopus jacki Guglielmino et al, 2018

= Gonatopus jacki =

Species of wasp

Gonatopus jacki is a species of small wasp in the family Dryinidae. It is found in United States.

== Etymology ==
The species was named after the collector of the specimen, John T. (Jack) Longino.

== Description ==
The species is similar to G. ashmeadi and G. agropyrus. Male is unknown. Female has brown head, antennae and legs. Mesosoma and metasoma black.
