= Tuukka Rask =

Finnish ice hockey player (born 1987)

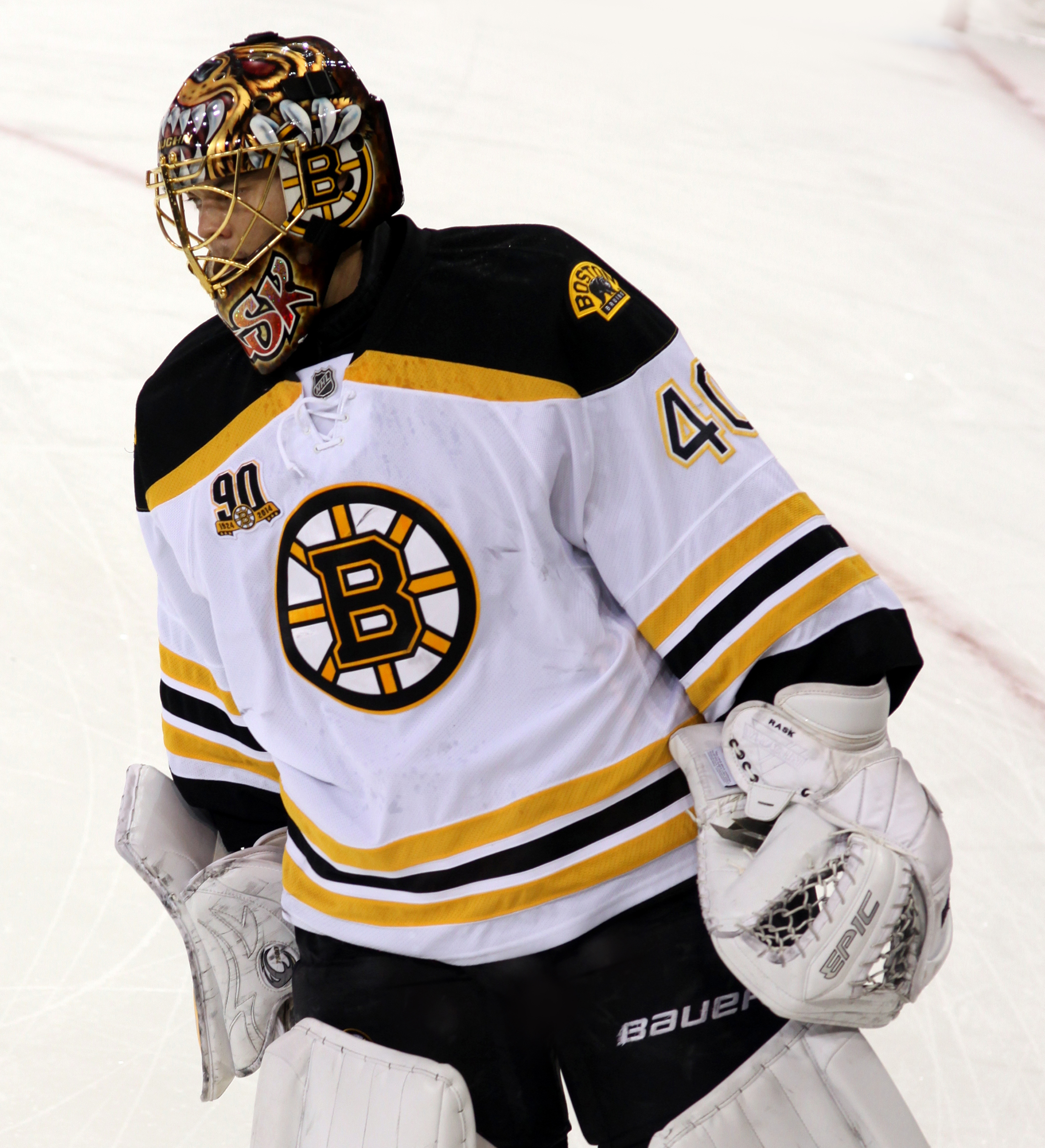
- Rask with the Boston Bruins in October 2013
- Born: 10 March 1987 (age 39) Savonlinna, Finland
- Height: 6 ft 2.5 in (189 cm)
- Weight: 176 lb (80 kg; 12 st 8 lb)
- Position: Goaltender
- Caught: Left
- Played for: Ilves; Boston Bruins; HC Plzeň
- National team: Finland
- NHL draft: 21st overall, 2005; Toronto Maple Leafs
- Playing career: 2004–2022

Tuukka Mikael Rask (born 10 March 1987) is a Finnish professional ice hockey executive and former player. A goaltender, Rask was drafted 21st overall in the 2005 NHL entry draft by the Toronto Maple Leafs before being traded to the Boston Bruins in 2006, where he played his entire 15-season National Hockey League (NHL) career, from 2007 to 2022. Rask was consistently successful during his tenure with the Bruins. After winning the Stanley Cup as the backup goaltender with the Bruins in 2011, he led the Bruins as the starting goaltender to the Stanley Cup Final on two occasions in 2013 and 2019. He also won the Vezina Trophy as the league's top goaltender during the 2013–14 season, and was a finalist for the 2019–20 award. He also won the William M. Jennings Trophy along with goaltender Jaroslav Halák in the 2019–20 season. Rask is also a two-time NHL All-Star team member. Internationally, he led team Finland to a bronze medal at the 2006 World Juniors, where he was also awarded the honor of Best Goaltender. He led them to another bronze medal at the 2014 Winter Olympics. Tuukka is the older brother of Joonas Rask, who plays professionally as a forward with Luleå HF in the SHL.

Rask holds the Boston Bruins record for regular season games played (564) and wins (308), as well as the playoff record for games played (104) and wins (57). Among goaltenders with at least 250 games played, Rask is fourth in save percentage all-time (0.92103), third in goals against average (GAA) among goaltenders in the modern era (2.28), and eighteenth in goals saved above average (GSAA) all time (149.934). In the playoffs (min 15 games), Rask is eleventh in save percentage (0.92517) and sixteenth in GAA (2.22). Rask also holds the NHL record for most consecutive playoff games above the 0.900 save percentage mark, eclipsing 23 games during the 2019 Stanley Cup Playoffs. He is the only goaltender in modern NHL history to never lose a Conference Final game while having played at least two series, posting an 8–0 record with three shutouts, a GAA of 0.82, and a save percentage of 0.972 in those Conference Final games. He finished his career 3–3 in game sevens.

Rask was considered to be a true hybrid goaltender known for his economy of motion and was known for playing a very positionally sound game, where he would absorb the puck into his chest rather than reaching for it with his hands. He employed a narrow butterfly and he stayed on his skates to make high saves, rather than dropping to his knees. His style incorporates a low and wide stance, a unique shin-lock RVH positioning, and effective rebound control. The shin-lock RVH (reverse vertical-horizontal), which was a staple in his game during his early seasons as well as later in his career eventually caused him hip issues and ultimately ended his career after an attempted comeback in 2022.

== Playing career ==
=== Finland (2002–2007) ===
Rask started his career in the junior teams of his hometown club SaPKo in Savonlinna, Finland. He then played in 26 games for the Tampere-based Ilves's junior team in the SM-sarja. His goals against average (GAA) was 1.86 with two shutouts and a .935 save percentage. Rask played started as the primary goaltender for the Ilves senior team in the Finnish top-flight SM-liiga in 2004. He was the top-ranked European goaltender for the 2005 NHL entry draft.

In the midst of his play with Ilves, the Toronto Maple Leafs drafted Rask in the first round, 21st overall, in the 2005 NHL Entry Draft. However, before playing a regular season game for Toronto, he was traded to the Boston Bruins in exchange for former Calder Memorial Trophy-winning goaltender Andrew Raycroft. Toronto management instead chose to keep goaltender Justin Pogge, who had just won a gold medal with Team Canada at the World Junior Championships. Pogge would go on to play only seven games in the NHL, finishing his NHL career with a single win. It was later revealed the Bruins intended to release Raycroft, which would have made him available to Toronto without having to give up Rask.

In hindsight, the trade is widely considered to be one of the worst trades in Maple Leafs franchise history. Rask would experience many seasons of success with the Bruins, but Raycroft would play only two seasons for Toronto, recording disappointing statistics.

=== Boston Bruins (2007–2022) ===
==== Backup and emergence (2007–2010) ====
Rask would play a final season in Finland with Ilves in 2006–07. On 5 May 2007, Rask signed a three-year contract with the Boston Bruins and was in attendance to observe the Providence Bruins' 2006–07 playoff run for the American Hockey League (AHL)'s Calder Cup championship. The Providence team did not make it past the second round of the Calder Cup against the Manchester Monarchs, but nonetheless Rask practiced with the Providence team.

On 5 November 2007, Rask was called up to the Boston Bruins for the first time. Just two weeks later, on 20 November, he recorded his first NHL win, a 4–2 victory on the road against his former team, the Toronto Maple Leafs.

On 3 October 2008, the Bruins reassigned Rask to Providence. Rask had the best save percentage (.952) among the goalies in pre-season play, followed by teammates Manny Fernandez (.875), Tim Thomas (.869) and Kevin Regan (.857). Despite this, the team opted to go with the two veteran goaltenders, Thomas and Fernandez, for the 2008–09 season. With nagging back spasms keeping Fernandez from play shortly after the All-Star Game break, Rask was once again called up to serve as a second goaltender, and on 31 January 2009, he played his first (and only) game with the Bruins in the 2008–09 season, and earned his first ever NHL shutout, a 1–0 home effort against the New York Rangers, with Marc Savard scoring the only Bruins goal.

Not long after the beginning of the 2009–10 season, Rask, who had been named the backup goaltender to Thomas, signed a two-year extension to his contract with the Bruins on 5 November that kept him under contract through to the 2011–12 season. In the 2009–10 regular season, Rask was the only goaltender in the NHL with a GAA of less than 2.00 and the only goaltender with a save percentage over .930, becoming the only qualifying rookie in NHL history to lead the league with a sub-2.00 GAA while also leading the league in save percentage. Rask finished 4th in voting for the Calder Trophy.

==== Stanley Cup title, Vezina trophy and team dominance (2010–2019) ====
In the 2010–11 season, Tim Thomas returned to top form, effectively relegating Rask once again to the backup role. With the Bruins winning the Stanley Cup in 2011 against the Presidents' Trophy-winning Vancouver Canucks, Rask became only the second Finnish goaltender to do so, after Antti Niemi of the San Jose Sharks accomplished the feat the previous year while Niemi was with the Chicago Blackhawks. However, unlike Niemi who won the cup as a starter, Rask did not play a single minute during the Bruins' cup run. Instead, Thomas would play every game and eventually win the Conn Smythe as the playoff MVP after posting a 1.98 GAA and leading the league with a .940 save percentage during that year's playoffs. Thomas surrendered only eight goals in the seven games in the Stanley Cup Final against the Canucks.

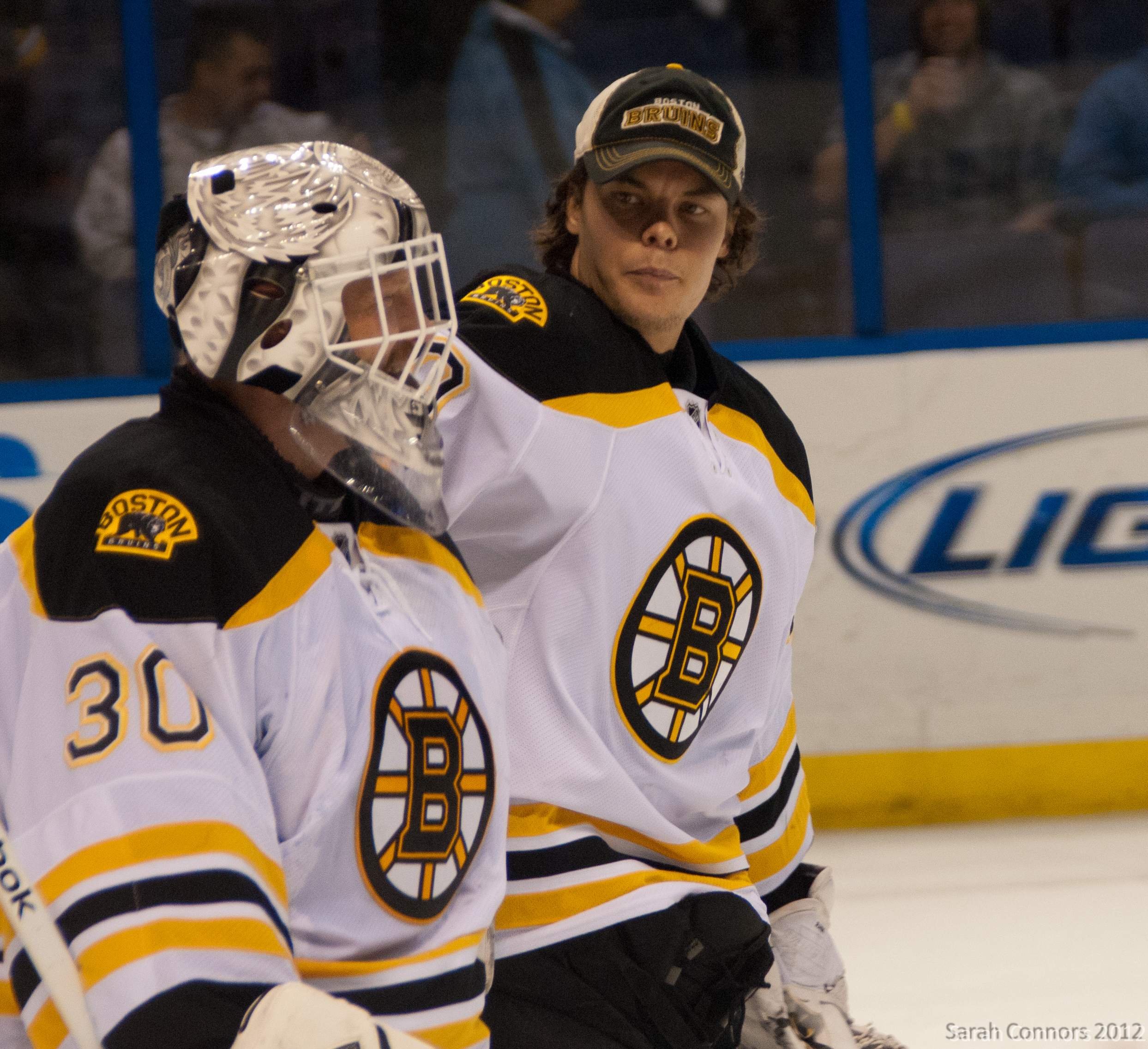
Rask (right) with Tim Thomas at the end of a game in February 2012

On 28 June 2012, Rask re-signed with the Bruins to a one-year, $3.5 million contract. Prior to the declaration of the 2012–13 lockout, Rask was named as the starting goaltender for the Bruins, replacing Tim Thomas, who would eventually be traded to the New York Islanders on 7 February 2013. During the lockout, which ended on 6 January 2013, Rask played for HC Plzeň, which won the Czech Extraliga that year. After the NHL resumed play, Rask led the Bruins to their second Stanley Cup Final in three seasons in the 2013 playoffs. In the third round of the playoffs against the top-seeded Pittsburgh Penguins, Rask faced 136 shots in four games played, allowing two goals while making 134 saves for a 0.50 GAA and a .985 save percentage. In the Stanley Cup Final, the Bruins were defeated in six games by the Presidents’ Trophy-winning Chicago Blackhawks, as Rask registered a .932 save percentage.

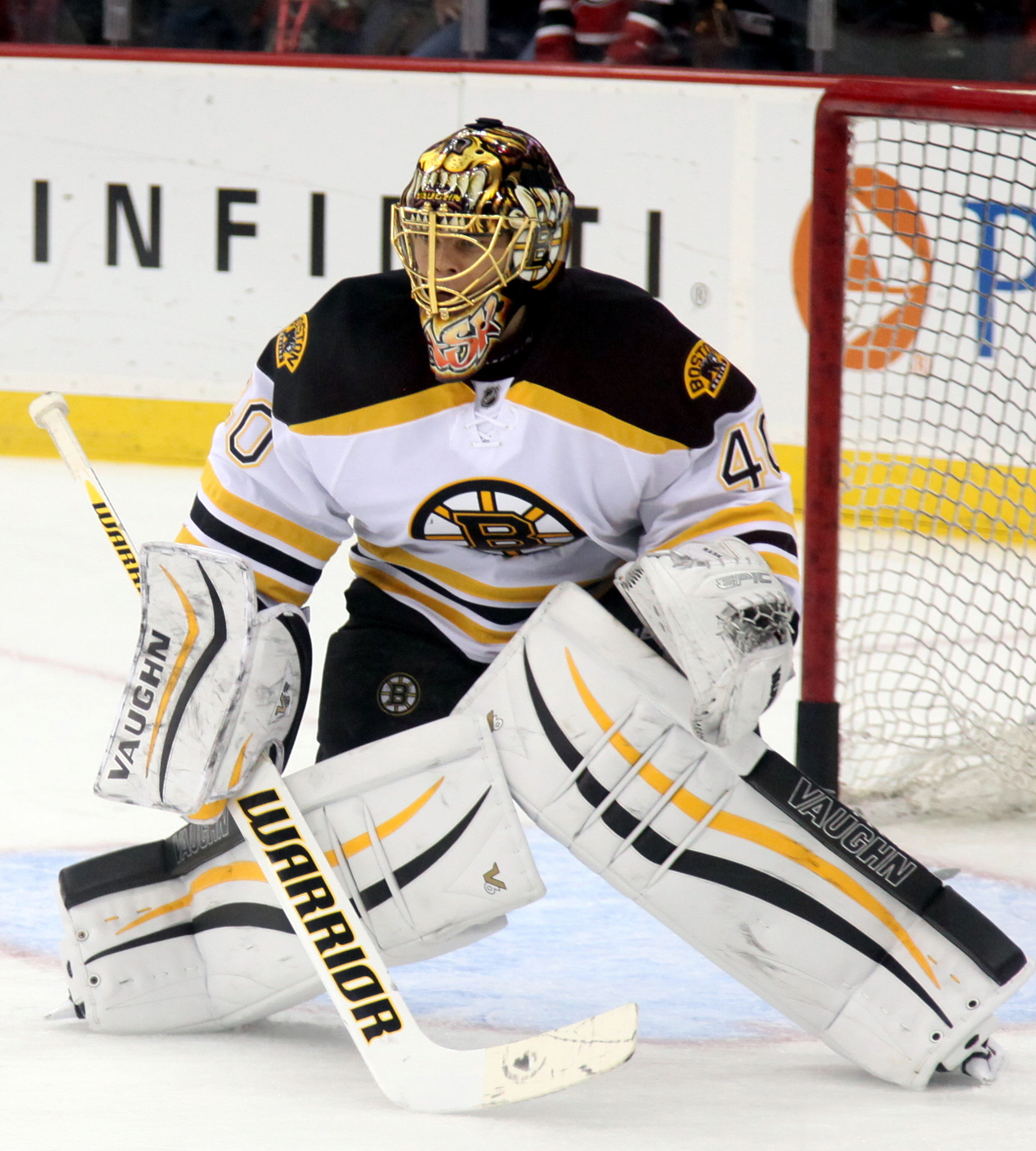
Rask with the Boston Bruins in January 2016

On 10 July 2013, the Bruins re-signed Rask to an eight-year, $56 million contract. Following the conclusion of the 2013–14 season, Rask was awarded the NHL's Vezina Trophy, awarded to the "goalkeeper adjudged to be the best at his position". He posted a 36–15–6 record, highlighted by a career-best ten-game points-won streak from 20 to 30 March, going 9–0–1, as the Bruins captured their first Presidents' Trophy since 1990 and led the Eastern Conference in team defence (2.08 goals allowed per game).

Early in the 2016–17 season, Rask sustained a groin injury that somewhat hampered his abilities much of the season following a successful October campaign, starting the 2016–17 season with 12 wins and a .938 save percentage in 17 games. He was likely used more often than usual, with the Bruins suffering from "backup goaltender" challenges early in the season, but not enough of a hindrance to help lead the Bruins to the 2017 playoffs, the Bruins' first playoff appearance in three seasons after narrowly missing the playoffs the previous two seasons. Following a six-game quarterfinal series with the Bruins losing to the Ottawa Senators four games to two, Rask successfully underwent groin surgery on 9 May 2017. In mid-August, Rask said he expected to be ready for the Bruins' training camp for the 2017–18 season.

In the 2017–18 season, from 26 November 2017 to 10 February 2018, Rask had a career-high 21-game point streak. Rask and the Bruins ended up finishing the season with 50 wins and 112 points, their best season since their 2013–14 Presidents' Trophy-winning season. He played only 54 games, his lowest since that same 2013–14 season, posting a 34–14–5 record with a 2.36 GAA and a .917 save percentage. In the 2018 playoffs, the Bruins were defeated in the second round in five games by the top-seeded Tampa Bay Lightning, with Rask playing 12 games total in the playoffs and posting a 2.88 GAA and .903 save percentage, his lowest since his first postseason in 2010.

On 1 January 2019, during the 2019 NHL Winter Classic against the Chicago Blackhawks, Rask set a new record for games played by a Bruins goaltender with his 469th game, surpassing Tiny Thompson's record set in the 1938–39 season. However, Rask was later placed on injured reserve by the Bruins on 28 January after sustaining a concussion. At the time of his injury, Rask had a 14–8–3 record in 25 starts. Rask returned to the Bruins lineup on 31 January, in a 3–2 overtime loss to the Philadelphia Flyers. It was his first start in a game since 19 January. On 3 February against the Washington Capitals, Rask recorded a shutout to become the career leader for wins by a goaltender in Bruins history, again surpassing Tiny Thompson. Rask helped the Bruins to the 2019 Stanley Cup Final, though they ultimately lost in seven games to the St. Louis Blues, one win short from a second Stanley Cup. Rask recorded a 15–9 record with a 2.02 goals against average and a .934 save percentage during the 2019 playoffs.

==== Later seasons and injuries (2019–2022) ====
Rask played his 500th game in the NHL on 22 October 2019, a 4–2 Bruins victory over the Toronto Maple Leafs. On 10 March 2020, his 33rd birthday, Rask recorded the 50th shutout of his career, against the Philadelphia Flyers. Due to the COVID-19 pandemic cancelling the last three weeks of the 2019–20 season and when the NHL announced its return-to-play plan for the playoffs, Rask would automatically win the William M. Jennings Trophy along with Jaroslav Halak and the Bruins would win the Presidents' Trophy as the regular season champions. During the NHL's Return to Play, Rask played five games in the "bubble" in Toronto in which teams were quarantined, including two games against the Carolina Hurricanes in the 2020 playoffs. On 15 August 2020, Rask opted to leave the playoffs, exit the bubble, and return to his family. After the Bruins elimination from the playoffs by the eventual Stanley Cup champion Tampa Bay Lightning, he revealed that the reason he left was his daughter going through an undisclosed medical emergency.

On 15 April 2021, Rask would return from an upper-body injury, where he recorded his 300th NHL win against the New York Islanders. He became the 37th goaltender and the fourth Finnish goaltender to achieve the milestone. Rask also became the fifth-fastest player to reach the milestone, which he achieved in his 552nd NHL game, and also became the first Bruins goaltender to reach the mark. On 21 May, Rask passed Gerry Cheevers for the most postseason wins by a goalie in Bruins history, after Rask won his 54th postseason game against the Washington Capitals in the 2021 playoffs. Following the game 6 exit of the Bruins from the playoffs in the second round against the New York Islanders, Rask revealed he had been dealing with an early-season injury to an acetabular labrum in one of his hips, necessitating surgery during the summer and a likely return to play for the team. Even with his upcoming free-agency resulting in UFA status by the upcoming season, Rask indicated he had no plans to play as a goaltender for any other team but the Bruins, going forward.

On 6 January 2022, Rask signed an AHL tryout contract with the Providence Bruins of the American Hockey League (AHL), with the intention to rehab from surgery before returning to Boston. However, the games he was slated to start in were postponed due to a COVID-19 outbreak among the Lehigh Valley Phantoms, who were then unable to travel to Providence for the weekend's contests. Despite missing those rehab starts, Rask signed a one-year contract with the Boston Bruins on 11 January, worth $1 million. In his return to the Bruins, Rask started just four games in the 2021–22 season before going back on the injured list. On 9 February, Rask announced his retirement from ice hockey.

=== Post-retirement ===
Following his retirement Rask has remained a member of the Bruins organization and has served as a corporate ambassador since 2022. He has also participated in benefit games for the Bruins alumni organization.

During the 2024-25 season Rask alongside Andrew Raycroft, and Patrice Bergeron started Unobstructed Views a Bruins themed alternate live telecast series which airs on NESN. In 2025 Rask would win a Regional Emmy Award for Outstanding Sports Interview/Discussion.

== International play ==
Medal record

Representing Finland

Men's ice hockey

Olympic Games
Bronze medal – third place	2014 Sochi	

World Junior Hockey Championships
Bronze medal – third place	2006 Canada	

Rask played in four of Finland's six games en route to the bronze medal at the 2014 Winter Olympics, including a 3–1 defeat of host nation Russia in the quarter-finals, and a shut-out of the United States in the bronze medal game. He was unable to play in the semifinal against Sweden due to flu, which Sweden took advantage of by defeating Finland 2–1.

On 2 March 2016, it was revealed that Rask was to be the starting goaltender for Finland in the 2016 World Cup of Hockey, ahead of Pekka Rinne. Rask played in two out of three tournament games and in one out of three pre-tournament games.

== Personal life ==
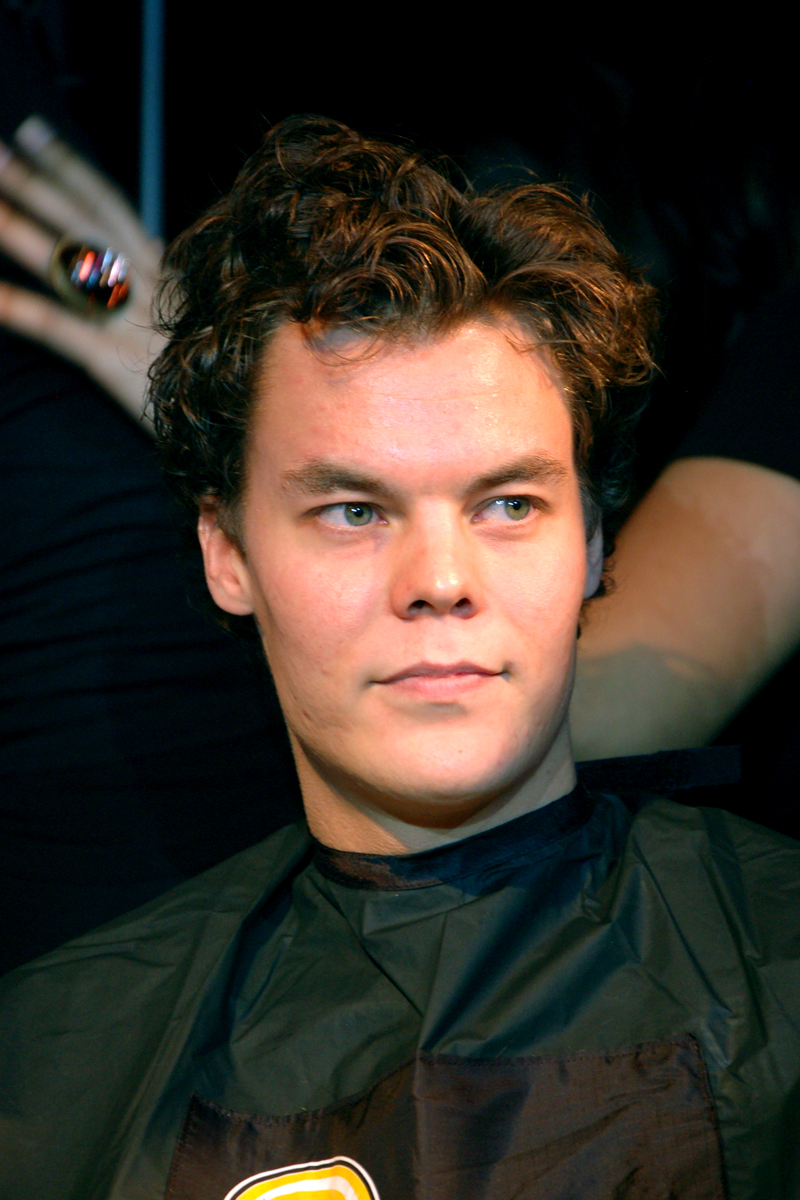
Rask in March 2008.

In 2022 Rask married his longtime girlfriend Jasmiina Nikkila, their wedding took place in Italy. The couple have 3 children together.

An avid golfer, Rask has also taken part in many celebrity golf tournaments in the New England area.

In February 2015, a recently discovered species of wasp in Kenya was named Thaumatodryinus tuukkaraski as a direct reference to Rask. The reasoning given by the authors was, "This species is named after the acrobatic goaltender for the Finnish National ice hockey team and the Boston Bruins, whose glove hand is as tenacious as the raptorial fore tarsus of this dryinid species."

== Career statistics ==
=== Regular season and playoffs ===
Bold indicates led league

			Regular season									Playoffs
Season	Team	League	GP	W	L	T/OT	MIN	GA	SO	GAA	SV%	GP	W	L	MIN	GA	SO	GAA	SV%
2004–05	Ilves	SM-l	4	0	1	1	202	15	0	4.46	.875	—	—	—	—	—	—	—	—
2005–06	Ilves	SM-l	30	12	7	8	1,724	60	2	2.09	.926	3	0	3	180	7	0	2.33	.924
2006–07	Ilves	SM-l	49	18	18	10	2,872	114	3	2.38	.928	7	2	5	397	20	0	3.02	.924
2007–08	Providence Bruins	AHL	45	27	13	2	2,570	100	1	2.33	.905	10	6	4	605	22	2	2.18	.908
2007–08	Boston Bruins	NHL	4	2	1	1	184	10	0	3.25	.886	—	—	—	—	—	—	—	—
2008–09	Providence Bruins	AHL	57	33	20	4	3,340	139	4	2.50	.915	16	9	7	977	36	0	2.21	.930
2008–09	Boston Bruins	NHL	1	1	0	0	60	0	1	0.00	1.000	—	—	—	—	—	—	—	—
2009–10	Boston Bruins	NHL	45	22	12	5	2,562	84	5	**1.97**	**.931**	13	7	6	829	36	0	2.61	.910
2010–11	Boston Bruins	NHL	29	11	14	2	1,594	71	2	2.67	.918	—	—	—	—	—	—	—	—
2011–12	Boston Bruins	NHL	23	11	8	3	1,289	44	3	2.05	.929	—	—	—	—	—	—	—	—
2012–13	HC Plzeň	ELH	17	12	5	0	993	35	1	2.11	.924	—	—	—	—	—	—	—	—
2012–13	Boston Bruins	NHL	36	19	10	5	2,104	70	**5**	2.00	.929	22	14	8	1,466	46	**3**	1.88	**.940**
2013–14	Boston Bruins	NHL	58	36	15	6	3,386	115	**7**	2.04	.930	12	7	5	753	25	**2**	1.99	.928
2014–15	Boston Bruins	NHL	70	34	21	13	4,063	156	3	2.30	.922	—	—	—	—	—	—	—	—
2015–16	Boston Bruins	NHL	64	31	22	8	3,679	157	4	2.56	.915	—	—	—	—	—	—	—	—
2016–17	Boston Bruins	NHL	65	37	20	5	3,680	137	8	2.23	.915	6	2	4	403	15	0	2.24	.920
2017–18	Boston Bruins	NHL	54	34	14	5	3,173	125	3	2.36	.917	12	5	7	687	33	0	2.88	.903
2018–19	Boston Bruins	NHL	46	27	13	5	2,635	109	4	2.48	.912	24	15	9	1,459	49	**2**	2.02	.934
2019–20	Boston Bruins	NHL	41	26	8	6	2,402	85	5	**2.12**	.929	4	1	3	257	11	0	2.57	.904
2020–21	Boston Bruins	NHL	24	15	5	2	1,397	53	2	2.28	.913	11	6	4	688	27	0	2.36	.919
2021–22	Boston Bruins	NHL	4	2	2	0	196	14	0	4.28	.844	—	—	—	—	—	—	—	—
NHL totals			564	308	165	66	32,405	1,230	52	2.28	.921	104	57	46	6,541	242	7	2.22	.925

=== International ===
Year	Team	Event	Result	GP	W	L	T/OTL	MIN	GA	SO	GAA	SV%
2004	Finland	WJC18	7th	5	1	1	3	299	8	1	1.61	.927
2005	Finland	WJC18	7th	5	2	3	0	278	14	0	3.02	.910
2005	Finland	WJC	5th	5	2	3	0	243	12	0	2.96	.902
2006	Finland	WJC	3rd place, bronze medalist(s)	6	4	2	0	369	13	1	2.11	.940
2007	Finland	WJC	6th	6	2	4	0	332	17	1	3.43	.887
2014	Finland	OG	3rd place, bronze medalist(s)	4	3	1	0	243	7	1	1.73	.937
2016	Finland	WCH	8th	2	0	2	0	119	4	0	2.02	.920
Junior totals				27	11	13	3	1521	64	3	2.63	.913
Senior totals				6	3	3	0	362	11	1	1.87	.928

== Awards, honors and records ==
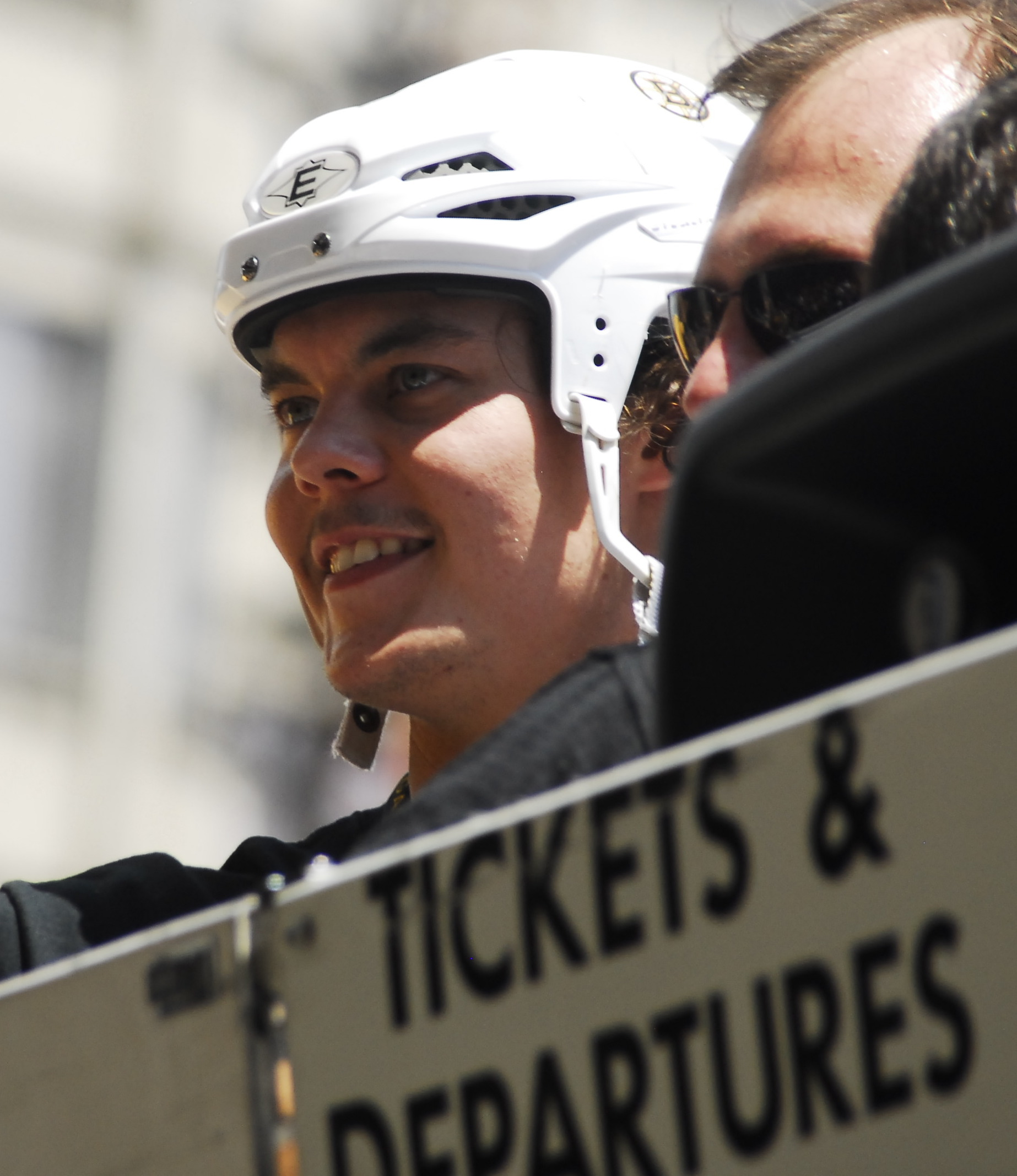
Rask during the Bruins' 2011 Stanley Cup victory parade

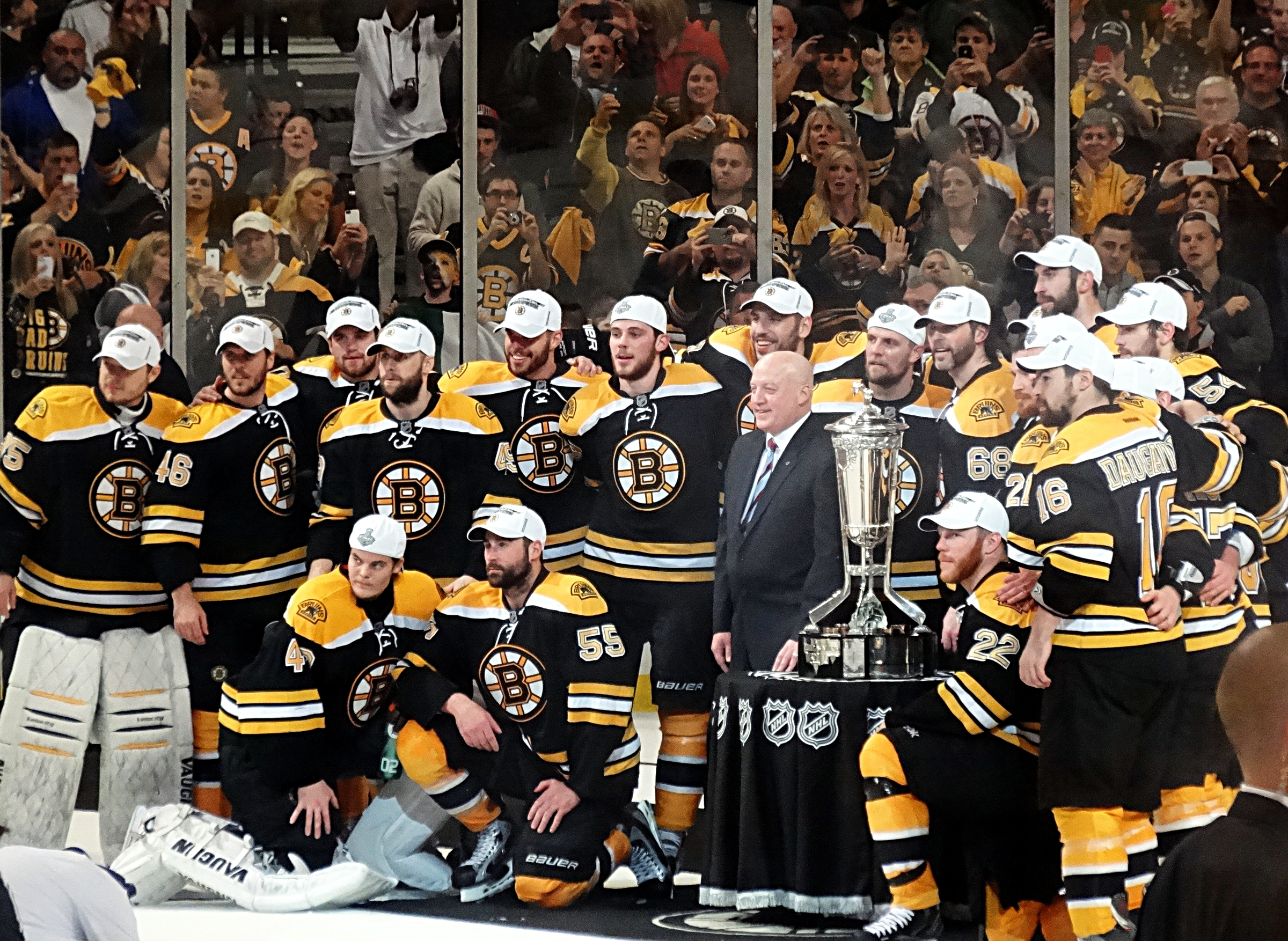
Rask and the Bruins are awarded the Prince of Wales Trophy following their Eastern Conference Finals series sweep over the Pittsburgh Penguins in the 2013 Stanley Cup playoffs.

Awards	Year
AHL
AHL All-Star Game	2008
NHL
Stanley Cup champion	2011
Vezina Trophy	2014
NHL first All-Star team	2014
NHL All-Star Game	2017, 2020
William M. Jennings Trophy	2020
NHL second All-Star team	2020
International
IIHF World Junior Championship Bronze Medal	2006
IIHF World Junior Championship Best Goaltender	2006
IIHF World Junior Championship All-Star team	2006
Finnish Ice Hockey Player of the Year	2013
Winter Olympic Bronze Medal	2014
Boston Bruins
Seventh Player Award	2010
John P. Bucyk Award	2014
Elizabeth C. Dufresne Trophy	2015
Bruins Three Stars Awards	2010, 2013, 2014, 2015, 2016, 2017, 2018, 2020
Named One of Top 100 Best Bruins Players of all Time	2024

=== Boston Bruins records ===
- Most games played by a goaltender in Boston Bruins history.
- Most wins by a goaltender in franchise history.
- Most shutouts in playoff series-clinching games in franchise history.
- Longest season-opening home point streak in Boston Bruins history.
- Most playoff wins by a goaltender in franchise history.

In addition to the above, a newly discovered wasp species, Thaumatodryinus tuukkaraski, was named in Rask's honor in 2015.

Awards and achievements
Preceded by Alexander Steen	Toronto Maple Leafs first-round draft pick 2005	Succeeded by Jiří Tlustý
Preceded by Sergei Bobrovsky	Winner of the Vezina Trophy; 2014	Succeeded by Carey Price
