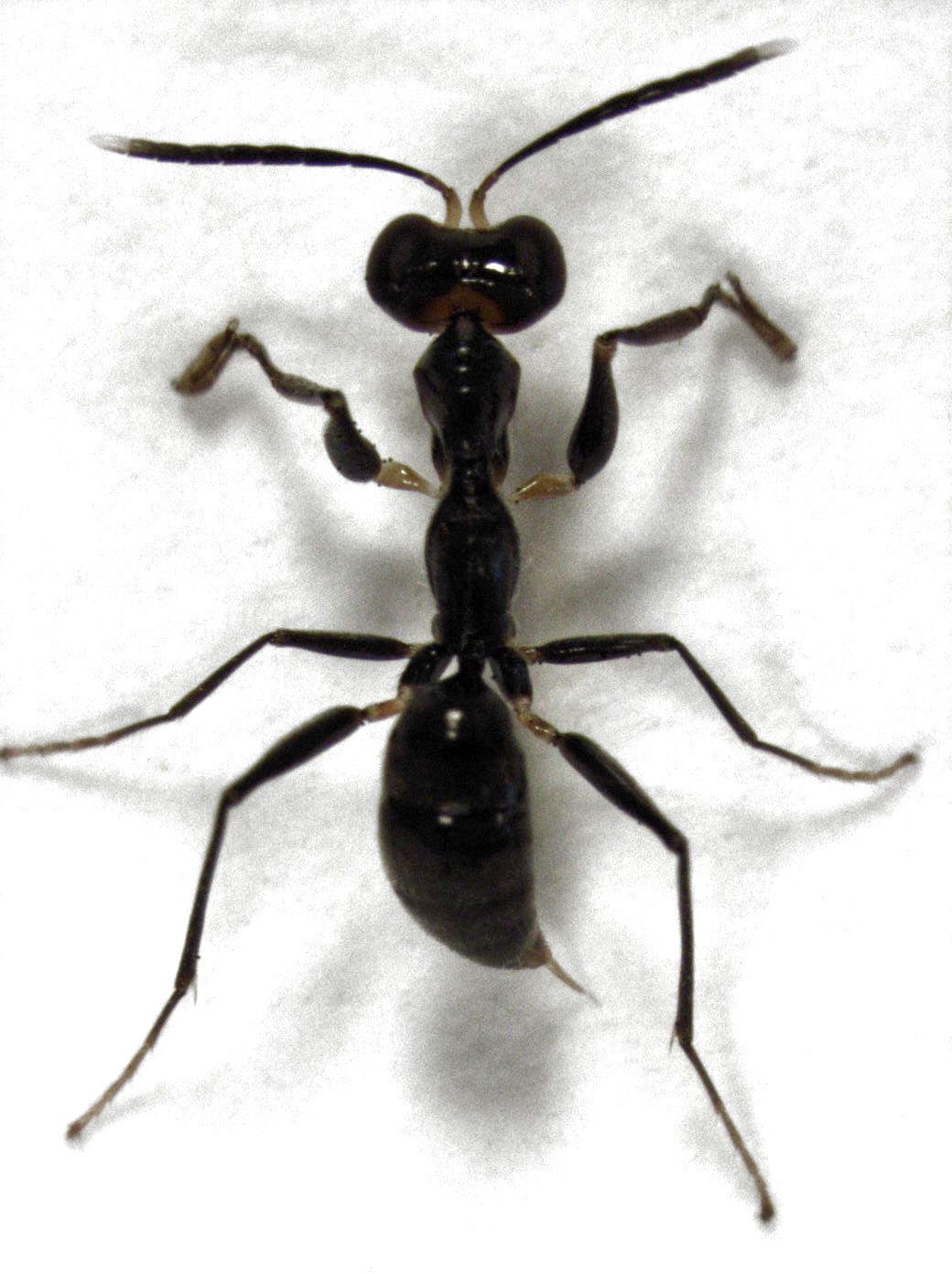
- Gonatopus zealandicus

Scientific classification
- Domain: Eukaryota
- Kingdom: Animalia
- Phylum: Arthropoda
- Class: Insecta
- Order: Hymenoptera
- Family: Dryinidae
- Subfamily: Gonatopodinae
- Genus: Gonatopus; Ljungh, 1810

Type species
- *Gonatopus formicarius Ljungh, 1810

Species
- See text

= Gonatopus (wasp) =

Genus of wasps

Gonatopus is a genus of solitary wasps of the family Dryinidae, sometimes called hump-backed pincer wasps. The wingless females have large scissor-like appendages at the tips of the front legs which are used to catch the leafhopper nymphs which act as hosts to the larvae of these wasps. The larva consumes the leafhopper nymph from the inside. An indication that a leafhopper is hosting a grub is a cyst of accumulated shed integuments which surround and protect the growing wasp larva.

== Species ==
The following list is a list of the species included within the genus Gonatopus found in Europe: A new species Gonatopus jacki was described from Florida, USA in 2018.

- Gonatopus albolineatus Kieffer, 1904
- Gonatopus albosignatus Kieffer, 1904
- Gonatopus ater Olmi, 1984
- Gonatopus atlanticus Olmi, 1984
- Gonatopus audax (Olmi, 1984)
- Gonatopus azorensis (Olmi, 1989)
- Gonatopus baeticus (Ceballos, 1927)
- Gonatopus bicolor (Haliday, 1828)
- Gonatopus bilineatus Kieffer, 1904
- Gonatopus blascoi Olmi 1995
- Gonatopus brunneicollis (Richards, 1972)
- Gonatopus camelinus Kieffer, 1904
- Gonatopus canariensis (Olmi, 1984)
- Gonatopus chersonesius Ponomarenko, 1970
- Gonatopus clavipes (Thunberg 1827)
- Gonatopus distinctus Kieffer, 1906
- Gonatopus distinguendus Kieffer, 1905
- Gonatopus doderoi (Olmi & Currado, 1974)
- Gonatopus dromedarius (Costa, 1882)
- Gonatopus europaeus (Olmi, 1986)
- Gonatopus felix (Olmi, 1984)
- Gonatopus focarilei (Olmi, 1984)
- Gonatopus formicarius Ljungh, 1810
- Gonatopus formicicolus (Richards, 1939)
- Gonatopus fortunatus Olmi, 1993
- Gonatopus graecus Olmi, 1984
- Gonatopus helleni (Raatikainen, 1961)
- Gonatopus horvathi Kieffer, 1906
- Gonatopus kenitrensis Olmi, 1990
- Gonatopus lindbergi Hellen, 1930
- Gonatopus longicollis (Kieffer, 1905)
- Gonatopus lunatus Klug, 1810
- Gonatopus lycius Olmi, 1989
- Gonatopus mediterraneus Olmi, 1990
- Gonatopus nearcticus (Fenton, 1927)
- Gonatopus pallidus (Ceballos, 1927)
- Gonatopus pedestris Dalman, 1818
- Gonatopus planiceps Kieffer, 1904
- Gonatopus plumbeus Olmi, 1984
- Gonatopus popovi Ponomarenko, 1965
- Gonatopus pulicarius Klug, 1810
- Gonatopus rosellae (Currado & Olmi, 1974)
- Gonatopus solidus (Haupt, 1938)
- Gonatopus spectrum (Snellen van Vollenhoven, 1874)
- Gonatopus striatus Kieffer, 1905
- Gonatopus subtilis Olmi, 1984
- Gonatopus tenerifei Olmi, 1984
- Gonatopus tussaci (Olmi, 1989)
- Gonatopus unilineatus Kieffer, 1904
- Gonatopus vistosus Olmi, 1984
