= Gonatopus clavipes =

Scientific classification
- Kingdom: Animalia
- Phylum: Arthropoda
- Clade: Pancrustacea
- Class: Insecta
- Order: Hymenoptera
- Family: Dryinidae
- Genus: Gonatopus
- Species: G. clavipes

Binomial name
- Gonatopus clavipes (Thunberg, 1827)

Synonyms
- Gelis clavipes Thunberg, 1827; Gonatopus barbatellus Richards, 1939; Gonatopus borealis Sahlberg, 1910; Gonatopus campestris Ponomarenko, 1965; Gonatopus hispanicus Kieffer, 1905; Gonatopus krogerii Hellen, 1935; Gonatopus pilosus Thomson, 1860; Gonatopus rhaensis Ponomarenko, 1970; Gonatopus sepsoides Westwood, 1833; Gonatopus sociabilis Kieffer, 1907; Gonatopus wagneri Strand, 1919; Labeo nigerrimus Forster, 1861; Labeo pusillus Szepligeti, 1901

Species of wasp

Gonatopus clavipes is a species of small wasp in the family Dryinidae. It is a solitary wasp that superficially resembles an ant, and its larva is a parasitoid of leafhoppers in the subfamily Deltocephalinae. It has a Palearctic distribution, and within Europe parasitises at least eleven genera and thirty-one species of leafhopper.

== Description ==
The adult G. clavipes is between 2.5 and 3.5 millimetres (0.10 and 0.14 in) long. Males are winged but females are wingless. The maxillary palps have 4 to 5 joints. The body is black and parts of the head and pedicel are yellowish. The proximal ends of the leg joints are yellowish-brown and the distal parts brownish-black. The legs have short bristles on the inside and end in a claw. The front pair of legs are modified into chelae for gripping prey, although in this species, the chelae are relatively small.

== Ecology ==
An adult female G. clavipes moves around the foliage hunting for a leafhopper, using her antennae in her search. When she finds one she pounces on it and grasps its hind legs, curling her abdomen upwards so as to be able to inject the prey with venom. This temporarily paralyses the leafhopper, and if it is the first one caught that day, the wasp eats part of it. With subsequent prey, she inserts a single egg into the abdomen between the tergites (hardened plates) with her ovipositor. The leafhopper soon recovers and carries on feeding. The wasp larva starts developing inside the abdomen of the host, but at about day five it makes its way outwards between two abdominal segments. It keeps its head inside its still-living host and creates a sac-like structure from its moulted skins, which protects the parts that protrude. Two or three weeks later it breaks its way out of this sac, feeds briefly on the leafhopper, and then descends to the ground, leaving its host's desiccated husk behind. It makes a cocoon at the base of a grass stalk where, if it is early in the year, it pupates, emerging as an adult insect some three to six weeks later. If it is late in the year, it remains as a larva and overwinters in the cocoon, pupating during the following spring.
