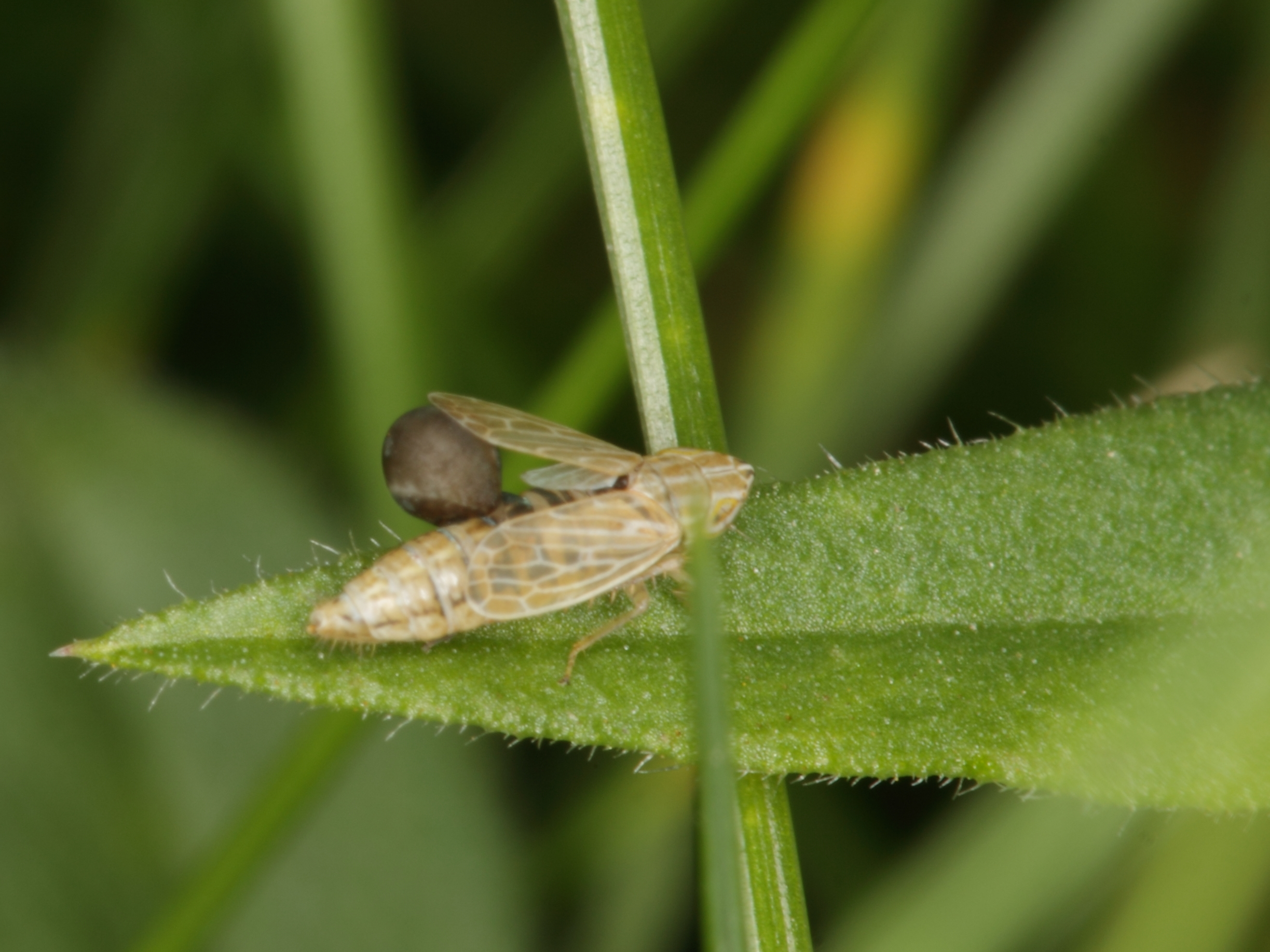
- A species, possibly Turrutus socialis, being parasited by a Dryinid larva.

Scientific classification
- Kingdom: Animalia
- Phylum: Arthropoda
- Clade: Pancrustacea
- Class: Insecta
- Order: Hemiptera
- Suborder: Auchenorrhyncha
- Family: Cicadellidae
- Genus: Turrutus; Ribaut, 1946

Species
- Turrutus personatus; Turrutus socialis

= Turrutus =

Genus of true bugs

Turrutus is a genus of true bugs that belongs to the family Cicadellidae. Species of this genus are found in Europe and North America.

== Taxonomy ==
There are currently two described species that belongs to this genus. They are listed below:

- Turrutus personatus (Beirne, 1954)
- Turrutus socialis (Flor, 1861)
