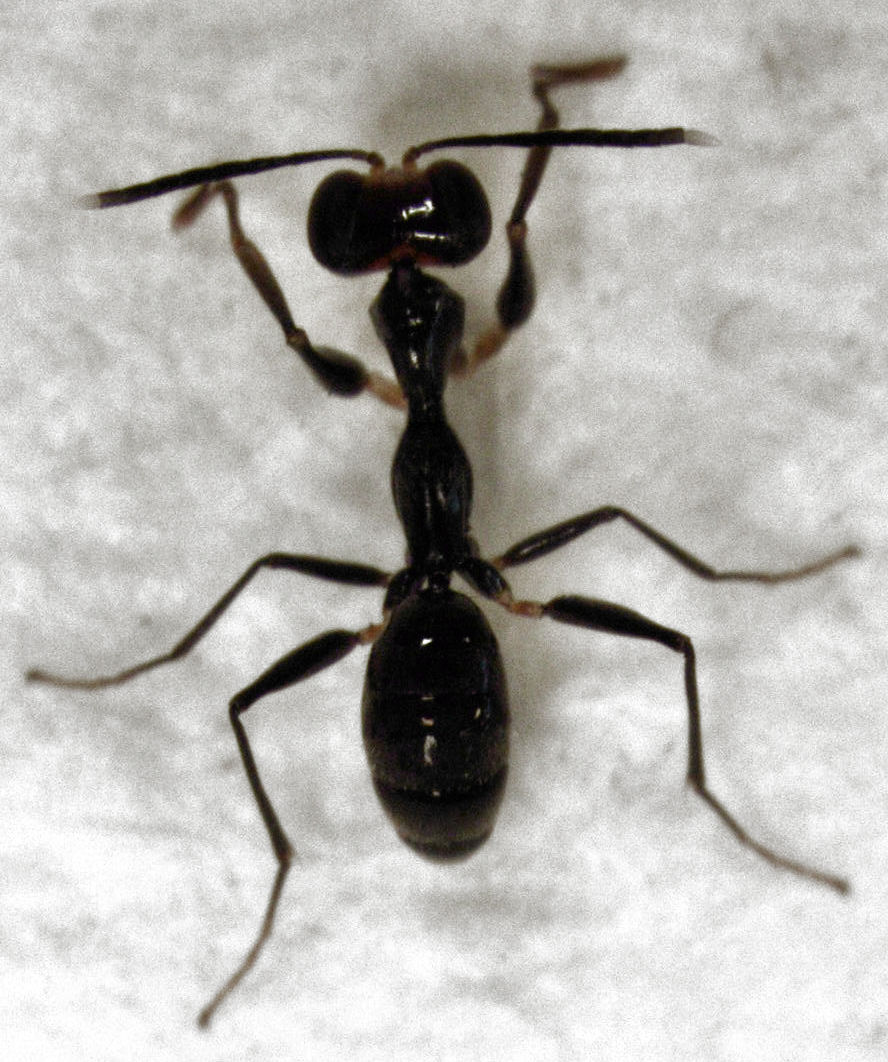
- Gonatopus zealandicus (female)

Scientific classification
- Domain: Eukaryota
- Kingdom: Animalia
- Phylum: Arthropoda
- Class: Insecta
- Order: Hymenoptera
- Family: Dryinidae
- Subfamily: Gonatopodinae

Genera
- Acrodontochelys; Adryinus; Agonatopoides; Donisthorpina; Echthrodelphax; Epigonatopus; Esagonatopus; Gonatopus; Gynochelys; Haplogonatopus; Neodryinus; Paraneodryinus; Pentagonatopus; Plectrogonatopoides; Pseudogonatopus; Tetrodontochelys

= Gonatopodinae =

Subfamily of insects

Gonatopodinae are a subfamily of Dryinidae with wingless, ant-like females, but winged males. Females have a chela on each front leg. There are 17 genera, including Gonatopus.
