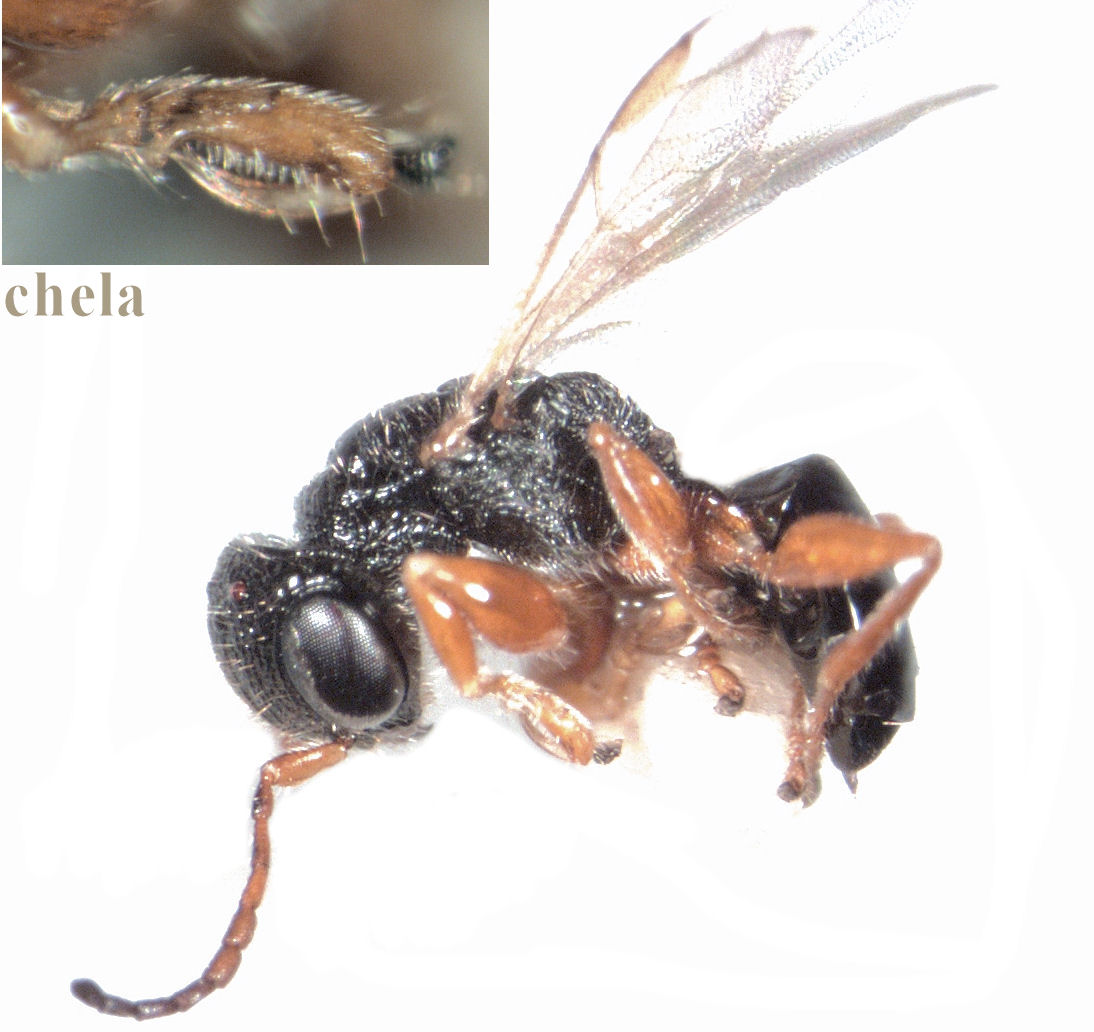
- Anteon caledonianum (female)

Scientific classification
- Kingdom: Animalia
- Phylum: Arthropoda
- Class: Insecta
- Order: Hymenoptera
- Family: Dryinidae
- Subfamily: Anteoninae

Genera
- Anteon; Deinodryinus; Lonchodryinus; Metanteon; †Anteonopsis; †Burmanteon

= Anteoninae =

Subfamily of insects

Anteoninae are a subfamily of Dryinidae. There are 4 extant and 2 fossil genera, including Anteon.

== Classification ==
Characteristics of the subfamily include a 'mask' covering the frontal region of the larvae, an absence of cephalic vesicles, body folded in a U-shape, always found on the thorax or between metathorax and abdomen of the host, never between abdominal segments, with the subfamilial characteristics of mature larvae being "very long setae on body and head, (2) labrum with few long sensory bristles and two sensory pits at about mid-length between anterior and posterior margin and with an apical row of sensory bristles inserted immediately under its apical margin, (3) epipharynx with two sensilla, (4) labium subtriangular with narrow subquadrate spinneret, (5) spiracles bulb-shaped, of approximately equal size in thorax and abdomen, and (6) cocoon in the ground, covered by soil particles."
