= Deinodryinus =

Scientific classification
- Kingdom: Animalia
- Phylum: Arthropoda
- Clade: Pancrustacea
- Class: Insecta
- Order: Hymenoptera
- Family: Dryinidae
- Subfamily: Anteoninae
- Genus: Deinodryinus; Perkins, 1907

Genus of wasps

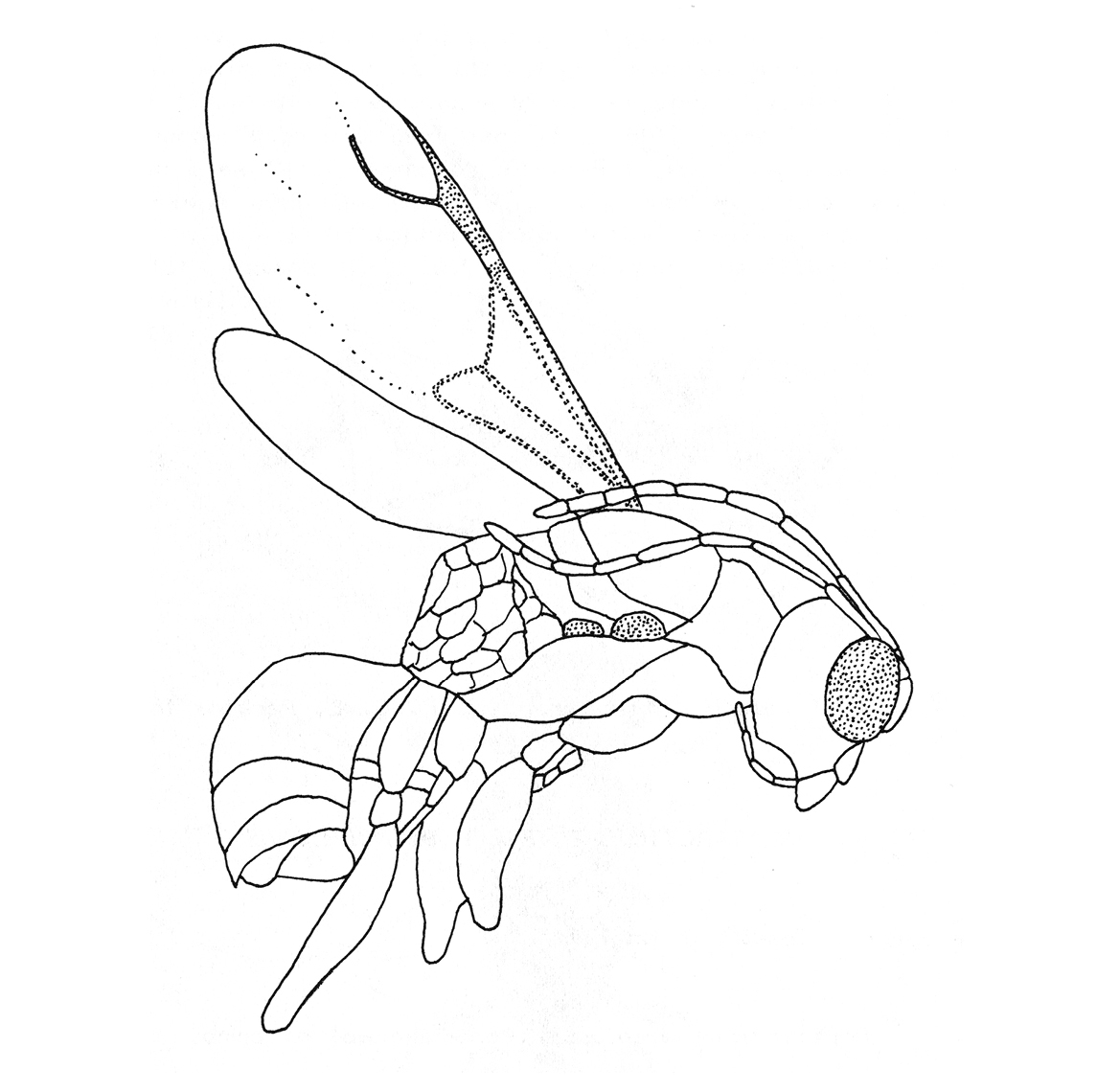
Line drawing of the female holotype of Deinodryinus areolatus

Deinodryinus is a genus of wasps belonging to the family Dryinidae.

The genus has almost cosmopolitan distribution.

== Species ==
Species:

- Deinodryinus ambrensis Olmi, Copeland & Noort, 2019
- Deinodryinus aptianus Olmi, Rasnitsyn & Guglielmino, 2010
- †Deinodryinus areolatus (Ponomarenko, 1975)
- Deinodryinus benoiti Olmi. D, 1984
- Deinodryinus bicolor (Olmi & Currado, 1979)
- Deinodryinus bilobus Fenton, 1927
- Deinodryinus bimaculatus Speranza Olmi, Guglielmino & Contarini, 2018
- Deinodryinus brasiliensis Martins & Olmi, 2021
- Deinodryinus capensis Olmi, 2007
- Deinodryinus mexicanus Martins & Olmi, 2021
