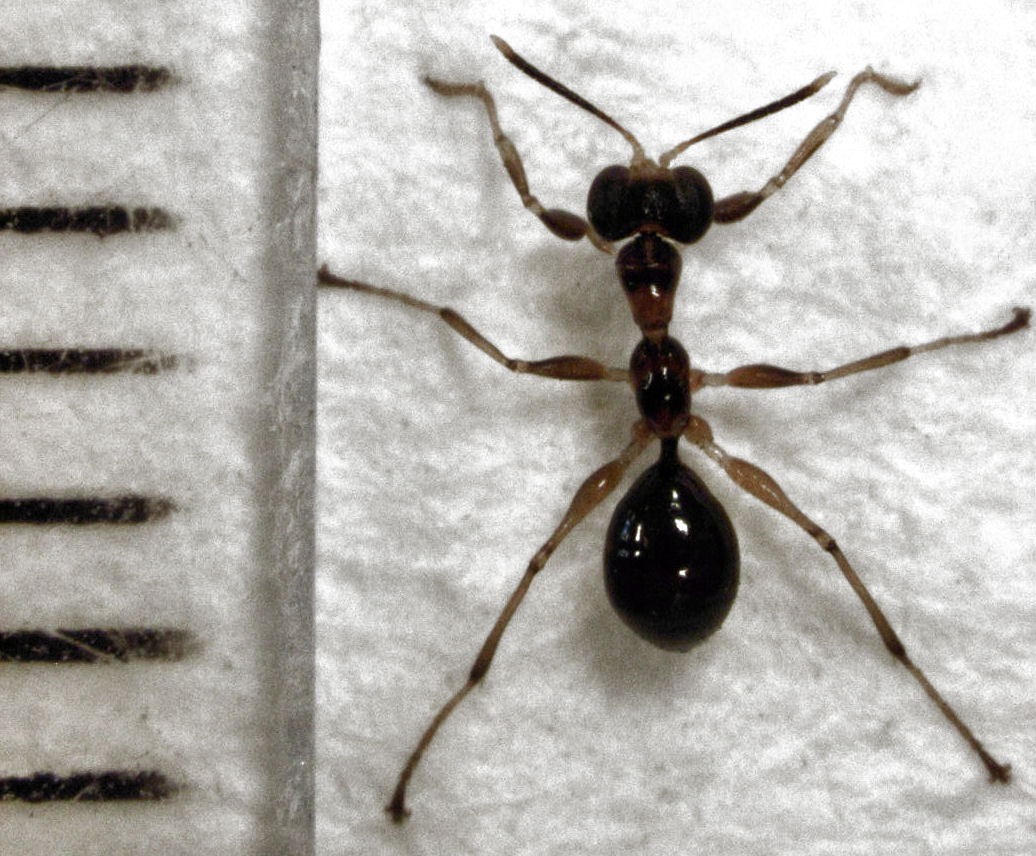
- Gonatopus alpinus female

Scientific classification
- Kingdom: Animalia
- Phylum: Arthropoda
- Clade: Pancrustacea
- Class: Insecta
- Order: Hymenoptera
- Superfamily: Chrysidoidea
- Family: Dryinidae; Haliday, 1833

Subfamilies
- Anteoninae; Aphelopinae; Apoaphelopinae; Apodryininae; Bocchinae; Conganteoninae; Dryininae; Erwiniinae; Gonatopodinae; Plesiodryininae; Transdryininae

= Dryinidae =

Dryinidae Temporal range: Barremian–Present

Family of wasps

Dryinidae is a cosmopolitan family of solitary wasps. Its name comes from the Greek drys for oak: Latreille named the type genus Dryinus because the first species was collected on an oak tree in Spain. The larvae are parasitoids of the nymphs and adults of Auchenorrhyncha. Dryinidae comprises over 1900 described species, distributed in 11 extant subfamilies and 57 genera.

== Description ==
The adult wasp can measure from 0.9 to 5.0 mm in length and in some cases can reach 13 mm. The body of the adult wasp has a 'waist' where it is constricted in the middle. The rear legs have spurs which may be used for grooming. The antennae have 10 segments. Many species have a marked sexual dimorphism, where males are totally different from the females in the size and shape of the body. Males have wings while females are often wingless and resemble worker ants. The ovipositor is retractable and not visible when retracted.

== Life history ==
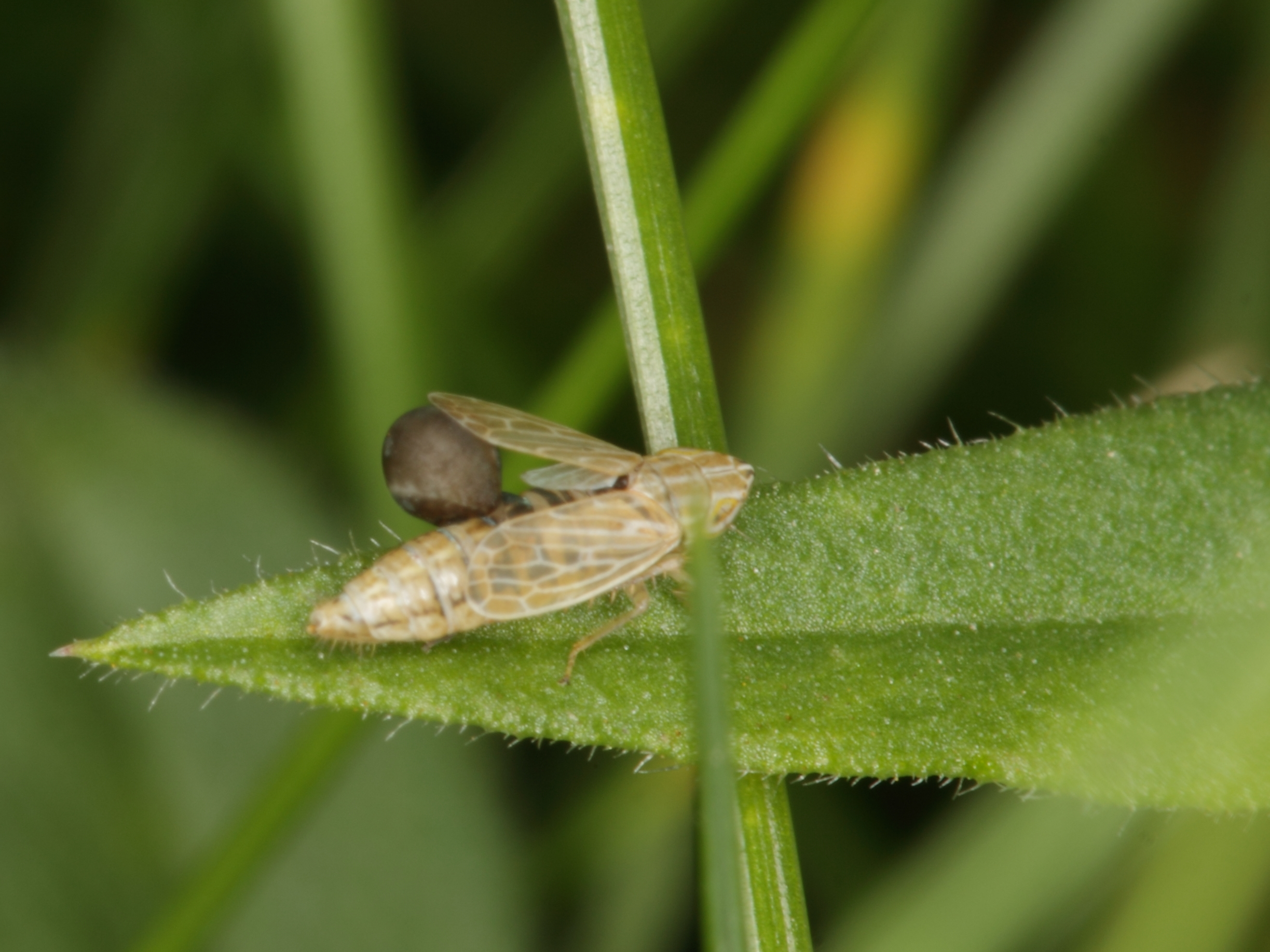
A leafhopper of the genus Turrutus (possibly Turrutus socialis) being parasited by a Dryinid larva.

The female dryinid injects an egg into the host insect with her ovipositor. Females may also have front legs modified with a pinching apparatus which they use to restrain the hosts for their larvae during oviposition. The larvae are legless or have only vestigial legs. The larva feeds on the internal structures of the host, and as it grows larger it begins to protrude from the body. It develops a hardened sac (called a "thylacium") around its body for protection. The host is eventually killed and the larva leaves the dead body and spins a cocoon.

== Gallery ==
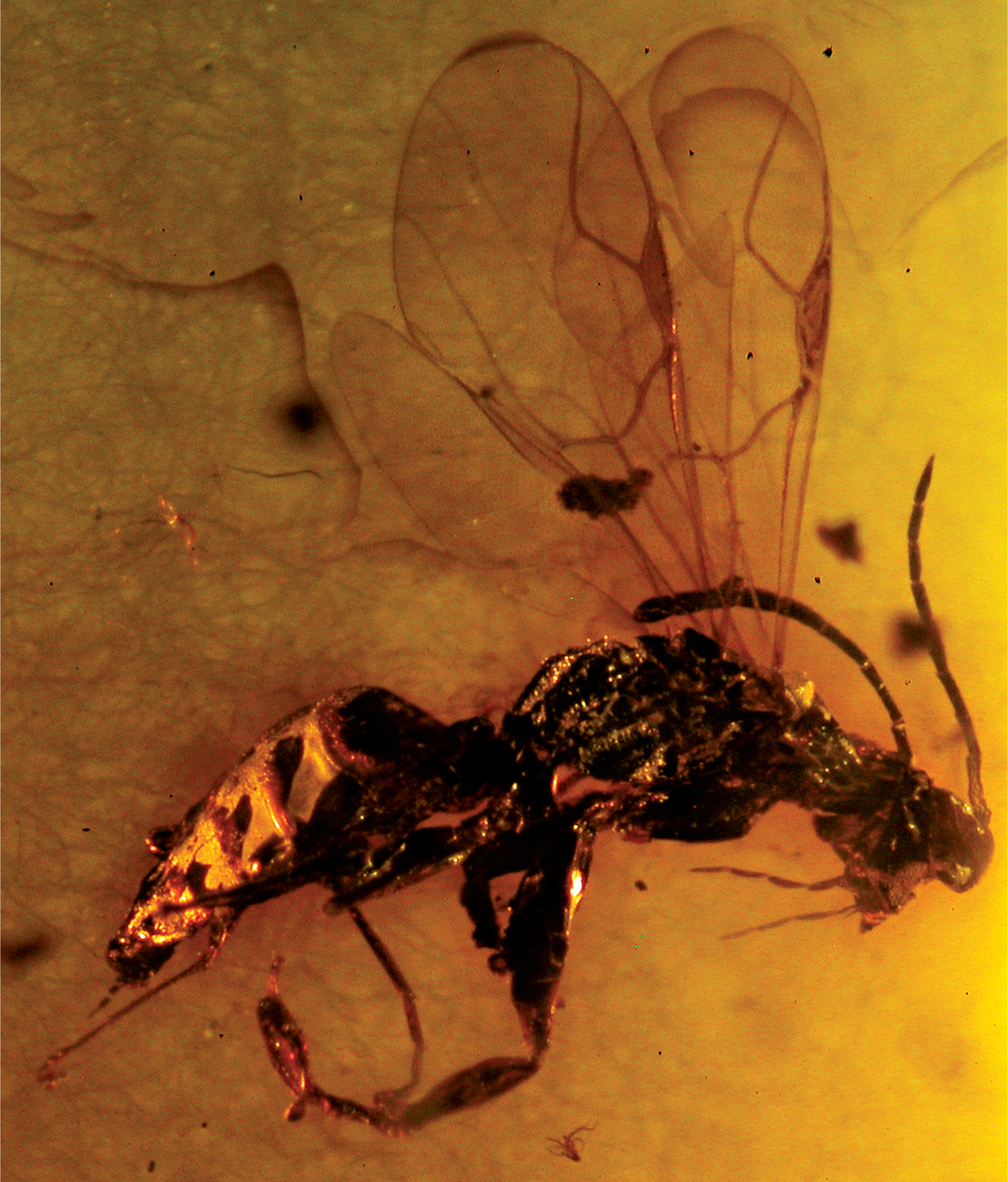
Deinodryinus velteni in amber

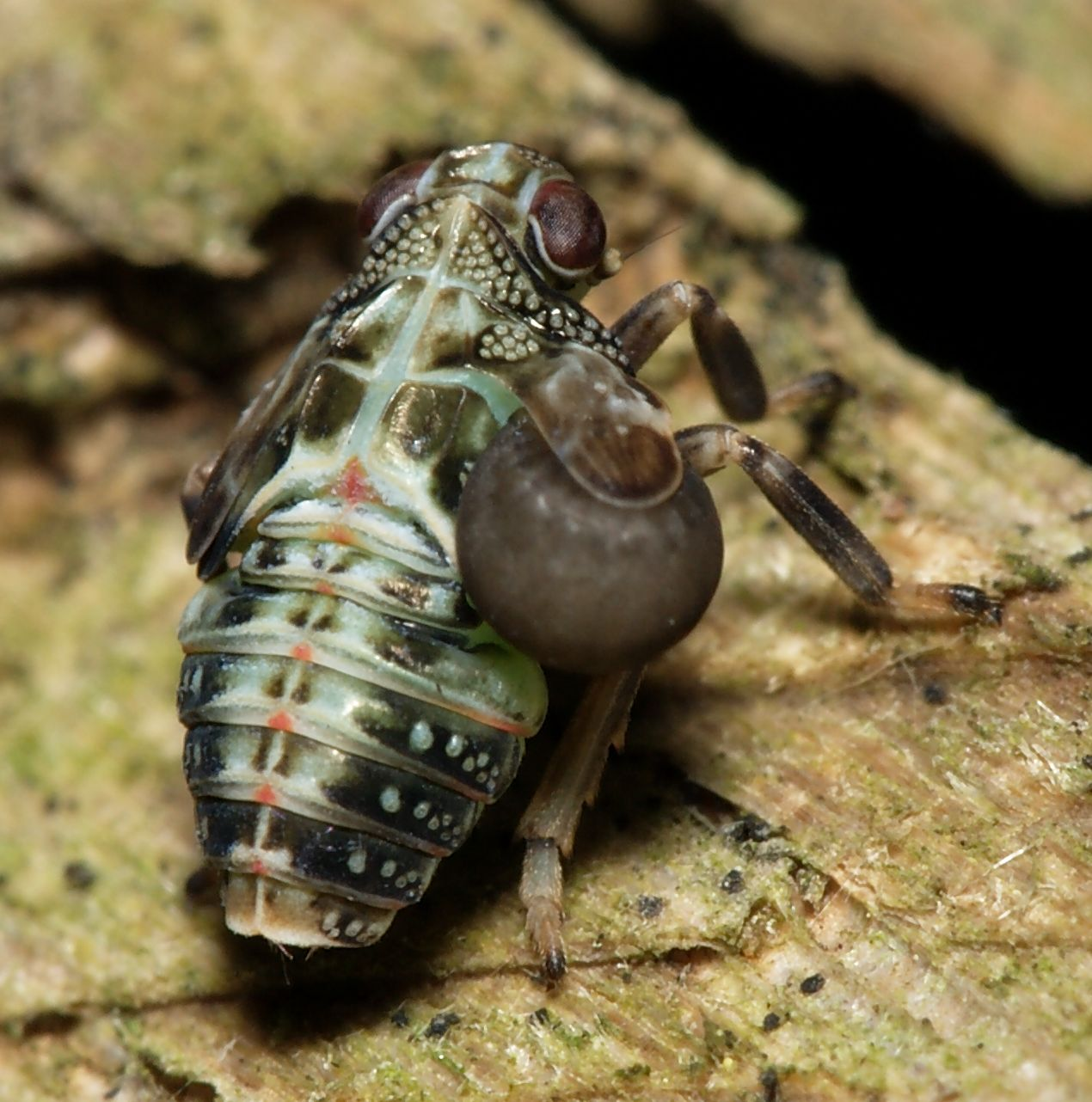
Issus coleoptratus nymph with dryinid larva under right wing

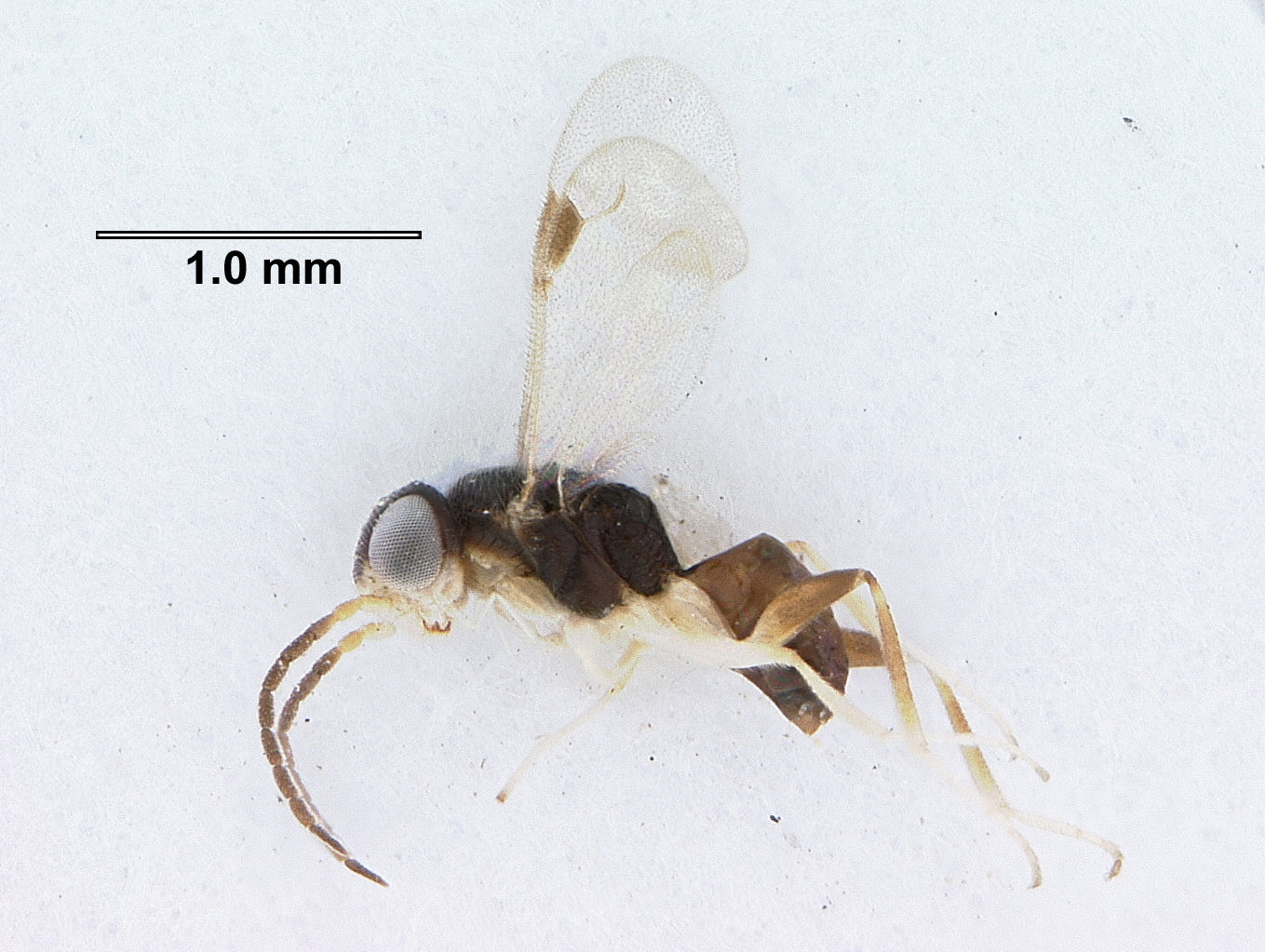
Aphelopus varicornis

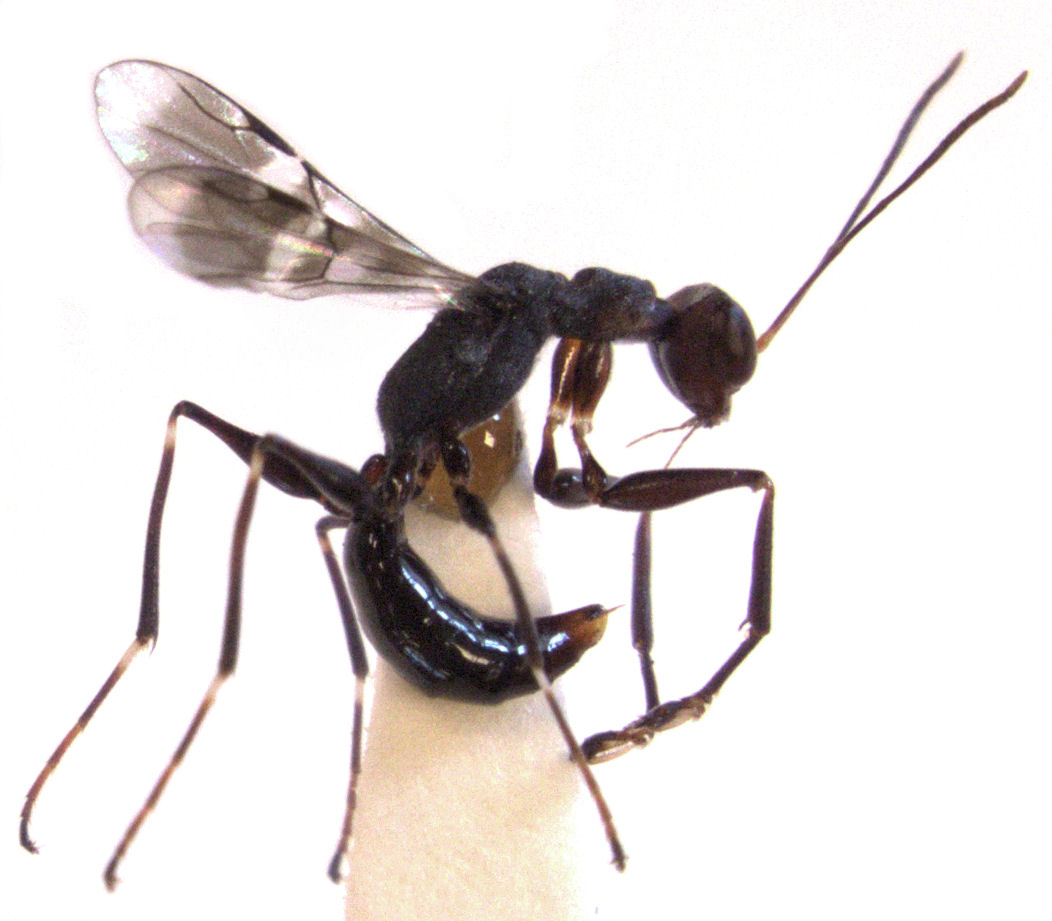
Dryinus koebelei female

== See also ==
- Gonatopus clavipes
