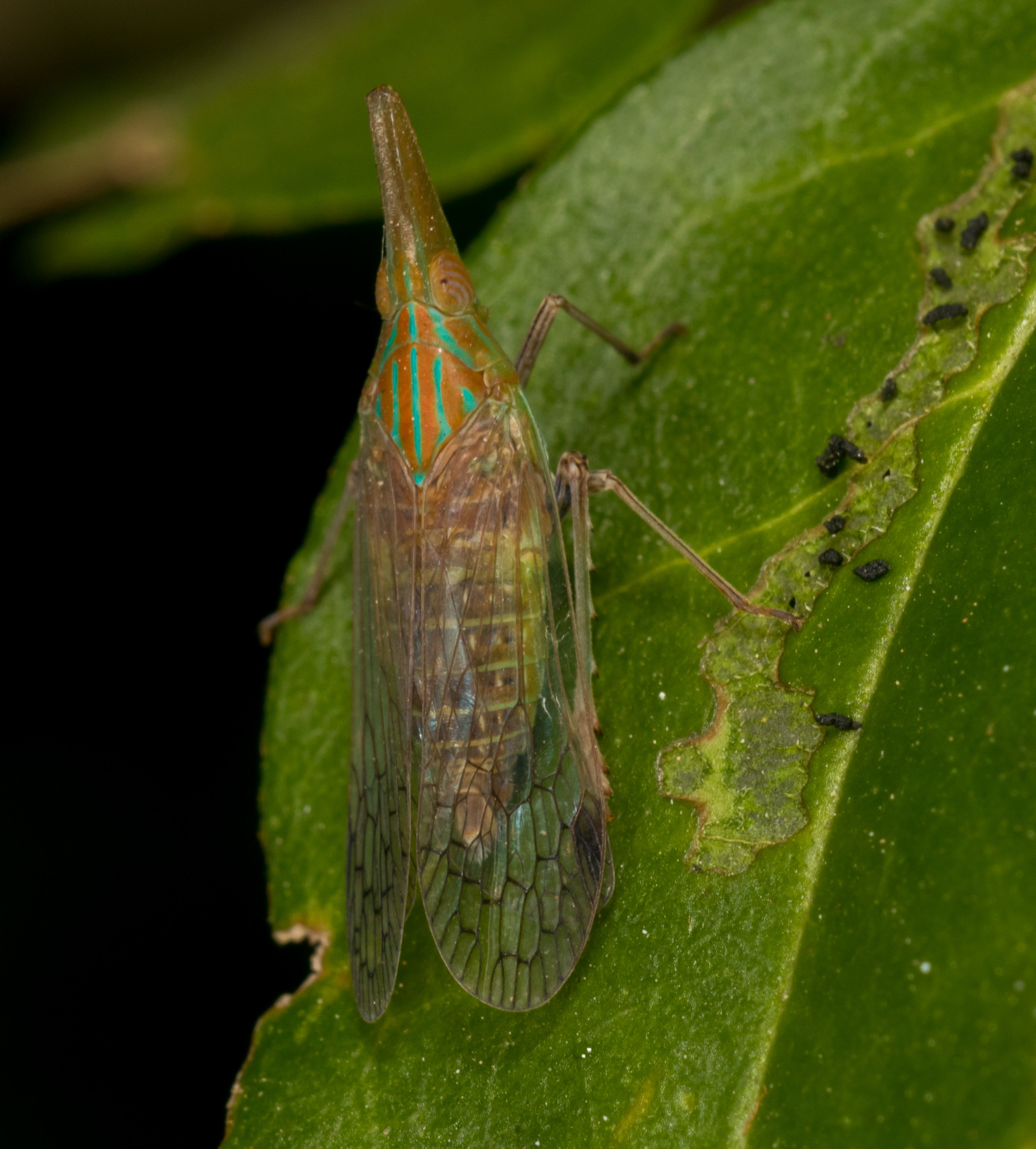
- Raivuna patruelis in Hong Kong

Scientific classification
- Kingdom: Animalia
- Phylum: Arthropoda
- Class: Insecta
- Order: Hemiptera
- Suborder: Auchenorrhyncha
- Infraorder: Fulgoromorpha
- Family: Dictyopharidae
- Genus: Raivuna
- Species: R. patruelis

Binomial name
- Raivuna patruelis (Stål, 1859)

Synonyms
- Dictyophara patruelis Stål, 1859; Pseudophana patruelis Stål, 1859; Dictyophara tengi Matsumura, 1905

= Raivuna patruelis =

Species of planthopper

Raivuna patruelis is a species of planthopper in the family Dictyopharidae found in Asia.

== Description ==
The insect is a dull greenish color with black eyes. The palpi and legs are dirty yellowish. The frons, clypeus, thorax, scutellum, and abdomen are yellowish-green, the temples are vitreous, the antennae are brownish-black, the stigma is brown and the wings are hyaline. Body length is 8.2–9.2 mm.

The head is small with the apex of the vertex slightly convex; the ocellar triangle is convex; the temples are yellowish-green. The thorax is yellowish-green with the anterior and lateral margins paler. The scutellum is slightly convex with parallel transverse grooves. The tegmina are slightly longer than the abdomen lengthwise, dirty vitreous, with transverse veins faintly brownish. The legs are dirty yellowish-green. The abdomen is dirty vitreous-yellowish with a black disc and broadly yellowish-green margins.

== Distribution and habitat ==
The species is widely distributed across Asia. It is known from South Asia (India, Sri Lanka, Bangladesh, southern Pakistan), Southeast Asia (Java, Borneo, Sumatra, Mainland Southeast Asia), and East Asia (China, Koreas, and Japan).
