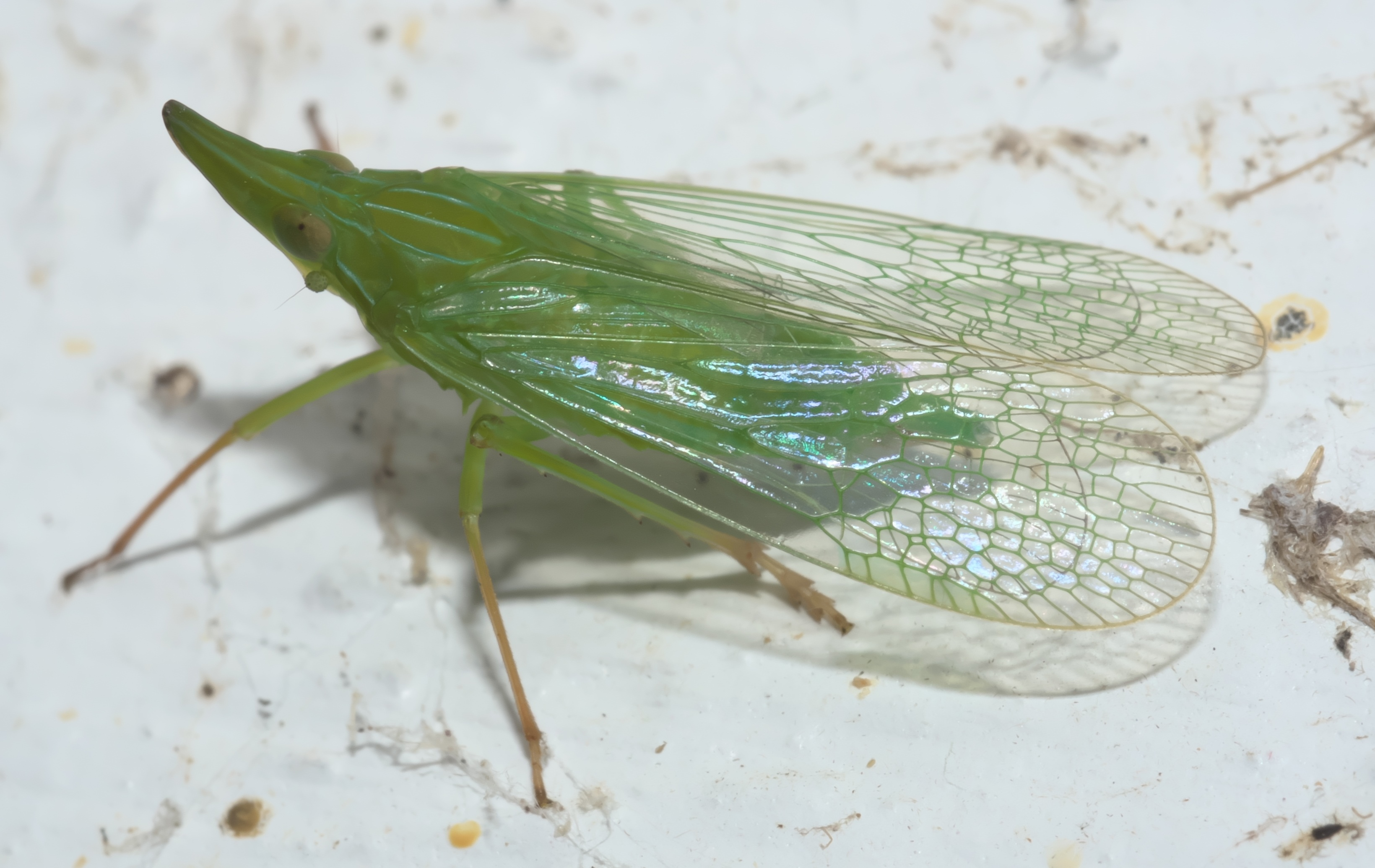

Scientific classification
- Domain: Eukaryota
- Kingdom: Animalia
- Phylum: Arthropoda
- Class: Insecta
- Order: Hemiptera
- Suborder: Auchenorrhyncha
- Infraorder: Fulgoromorpha
- Family: Dictyopharidae
- Subfamily: Dictyopharinae
- Genus: Rhynchomitra; Fennah, 1944

Species
- See text

= Rhynchomitra =

Genus of planthoppers

Rhynchomitra is a genus of dictyopharid planthoppers in the family Dictyopharidae. There are about five described species in Rhynchomitra.

== Species ==
These five species belong to the genus Rhynchomitra:

- Rhynchomitra cubanensis (Melichar, 1912)^{c g}
- Rhynchomitra lingula (Van Duzee, 1908)^{c g b}
- Rhynchomitra mexicana Fennah, 1944^{c g}
- Rhynchomitra microrhina (Walker, 1851)^{c g b}
- Rhynchomitra recurva (Metcalf, 1923)^{c g b}

Data sources: i = ITIS, c = Catalogue of Life, g = GBIF, b = Bugguide.net
