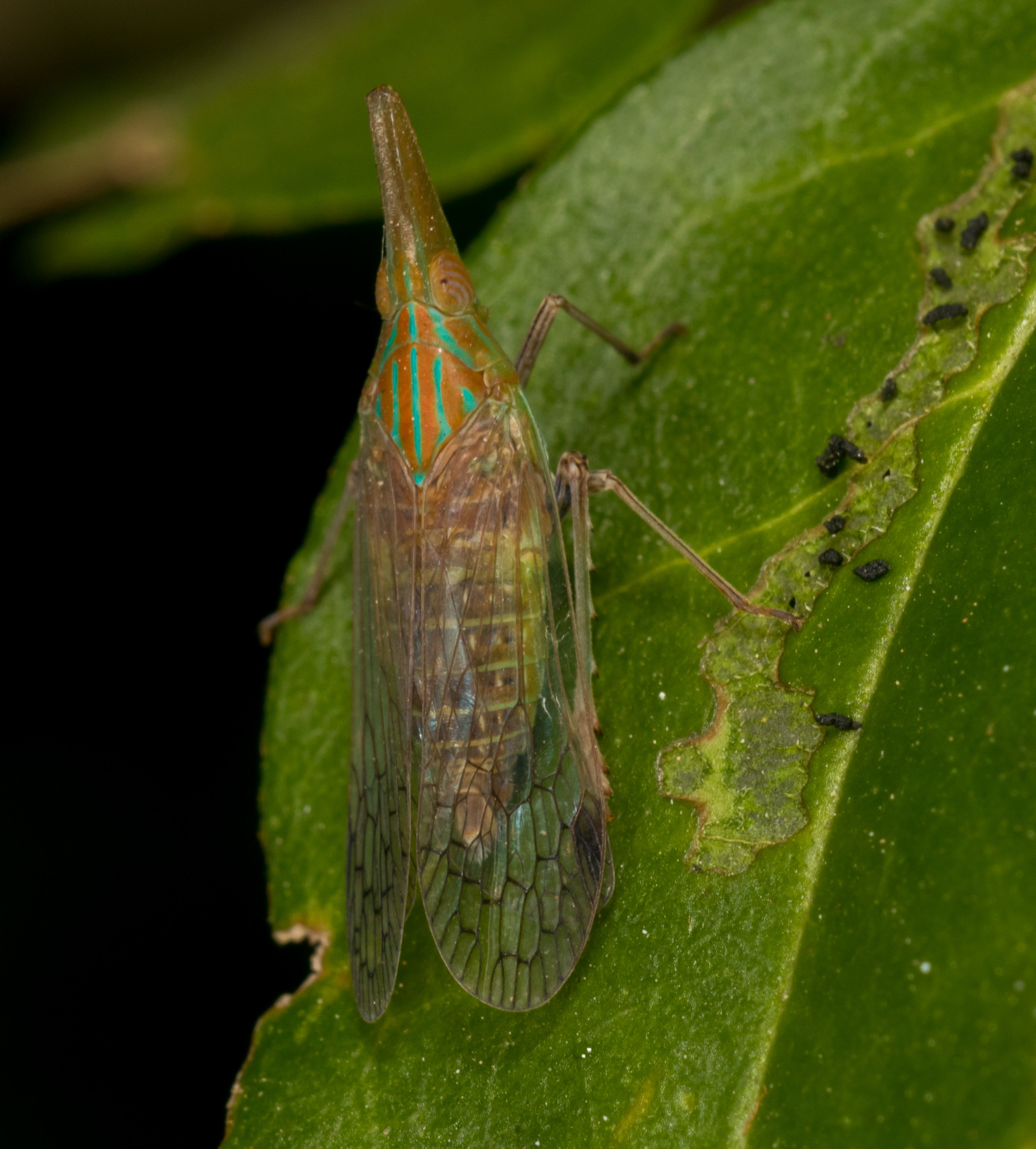
- Raivuna patruelis in Hong Kong

Scientific classification
- Kingdom: Animalia
- Phylum: Arthropoda
- Class: Insecta
- Order: Hemiptera
- Suborder: Auchenorrhyncha
- Infraorder: Fulgoromorpha
- Family: Dictyopharidae
- Subfamily: Dictyopharinae
- Tribe: Dictyopharini
- Genus: Raivuna; Fennah, 1978

= Raivuna =

Genus of planthoppers

Raivuna is a genus of planthoppers in the family Dictyopharidae found in Asia, Oceania, Madagascar, and Mauritius.

== Species ==
Species of this genus include:

- Raivuna albivitta (Walker, 1851)
- Raivuna albostriata (Linnavuori, 1962)
- Raivuna coimbatorensis (Distant, 1914)
- Raivuna colombonis (Matsumura, 1940)
- Raivuna cummingi (Distant, 1906)
- Raivuna despecta (Walker, 1851)
- Raivuna formosicola (Matsumura, 1940)
- Raivuna futana (Matsumura, 1940)
- Raivuna graminea (Fabricius, 1803)
- Raivuna hastata (Melichar, 1903)
- Raivuna inscripta (Walker, 1851)
- Raivuna insculpta (Walker, 1858)
- Raivuna iranica (Linnavuori, 1962)
- Raivuna leptorhina (Walker, 1851)
- Raivuna lyrata (Germar, 1830)
- Raivuna manchuricola (Matsumura, 1940)
- Raivuna micida Fennah, 1978
- Raivuna nakanonis (Matsumura, 1910)
- Raivuna ochracea (Lallemand, 1950)
- Raivuna pallida (Donovan, 1800)
- Raivuna patruelis (Stål, 1859)
- Raivuna percarinata (Kirby, 1891)
- Raivuna proxima (Melichar, 1912)
- Raivuna sinica (Walker, 1851)
- Raivuna sobrina (Stål, 1859)
- Raivuna striata (Oshanin, 1879)
- Raivuna unicolor (Signoret, 1860)
- Raivuna vittata (Puton, 1892)
- Raivuna walkeri (Atkinson, 1886)
