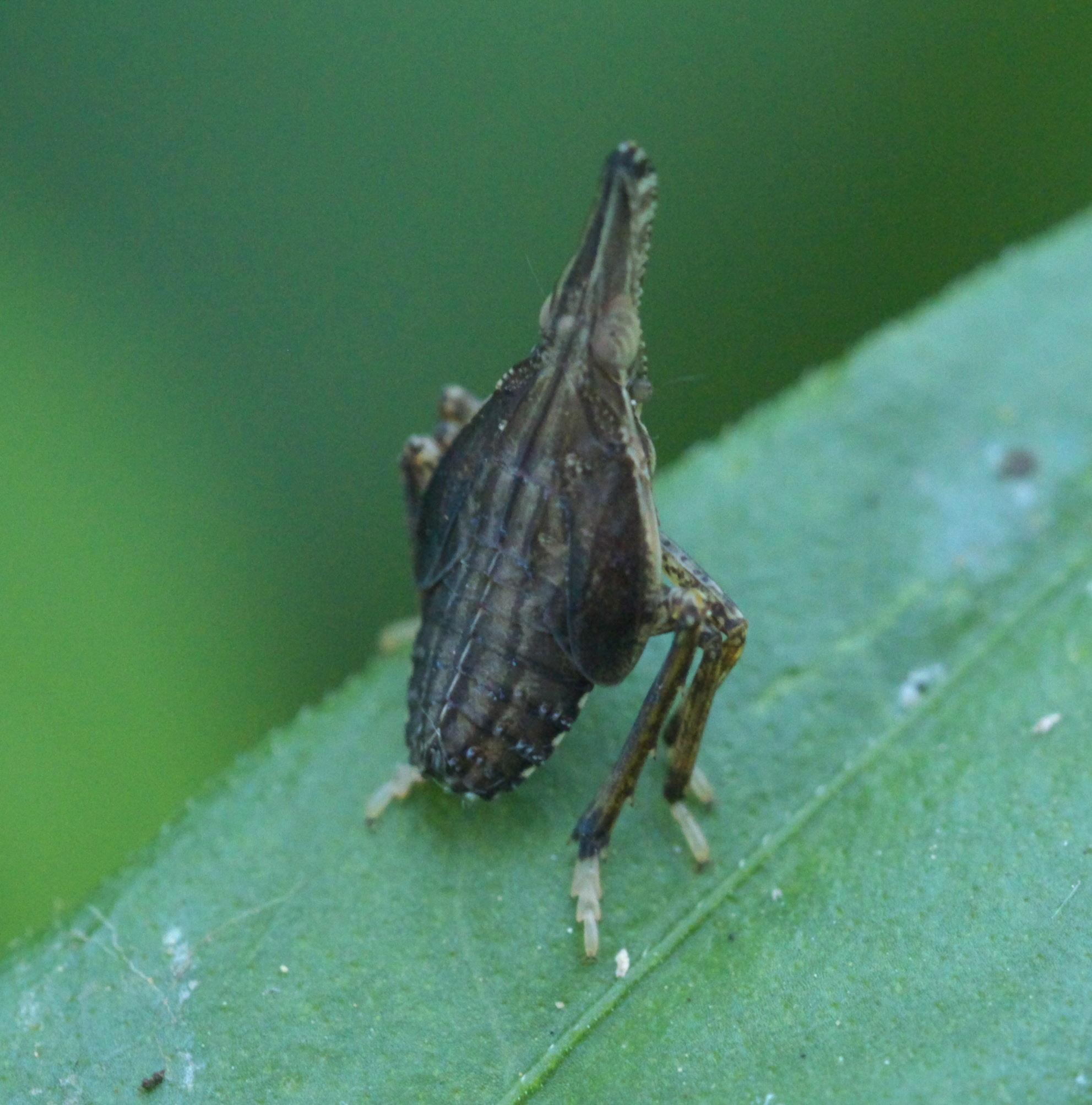

Scientific classification
- Domain: Eukaryota
- Kingdom: Animalia
- Phylum: Arthropoda
- Class: Insecta
- Order: Hemiptera
- Suborder: Auchenorrhyncha
- Infraorder: Fulgoromorpha
- Family: Dictyopharidae
- Genus: Rhynchomitra
- Species: R. microrhina

Binomial name
- Rhynchomitra microrhina (Walker, 1851)

= Rhynchomitra microrhina =

Species of planthopper

Rhynchomitra microrhina is a species of dictyopharid planthopper in the family Dictyopharidae.

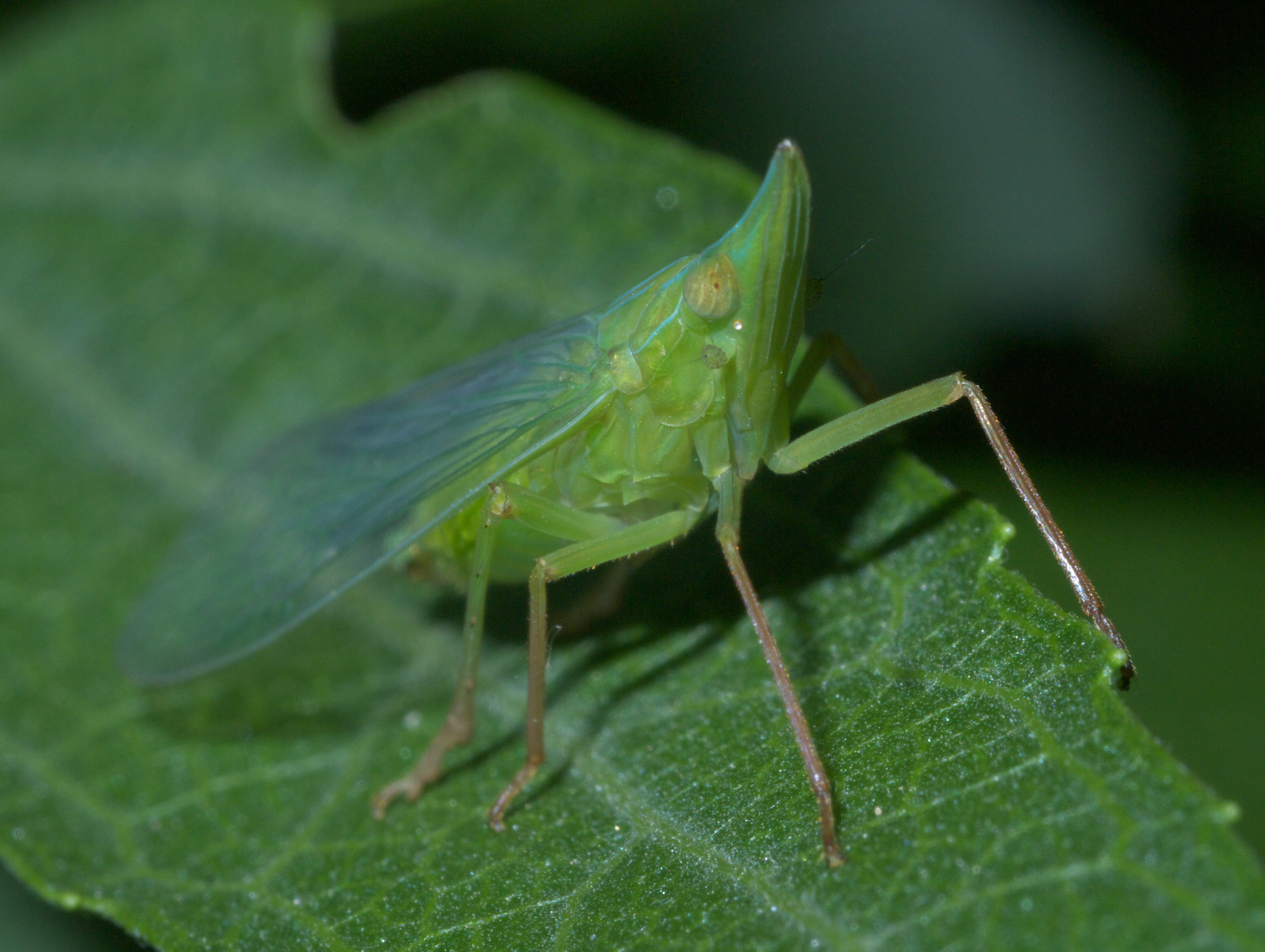

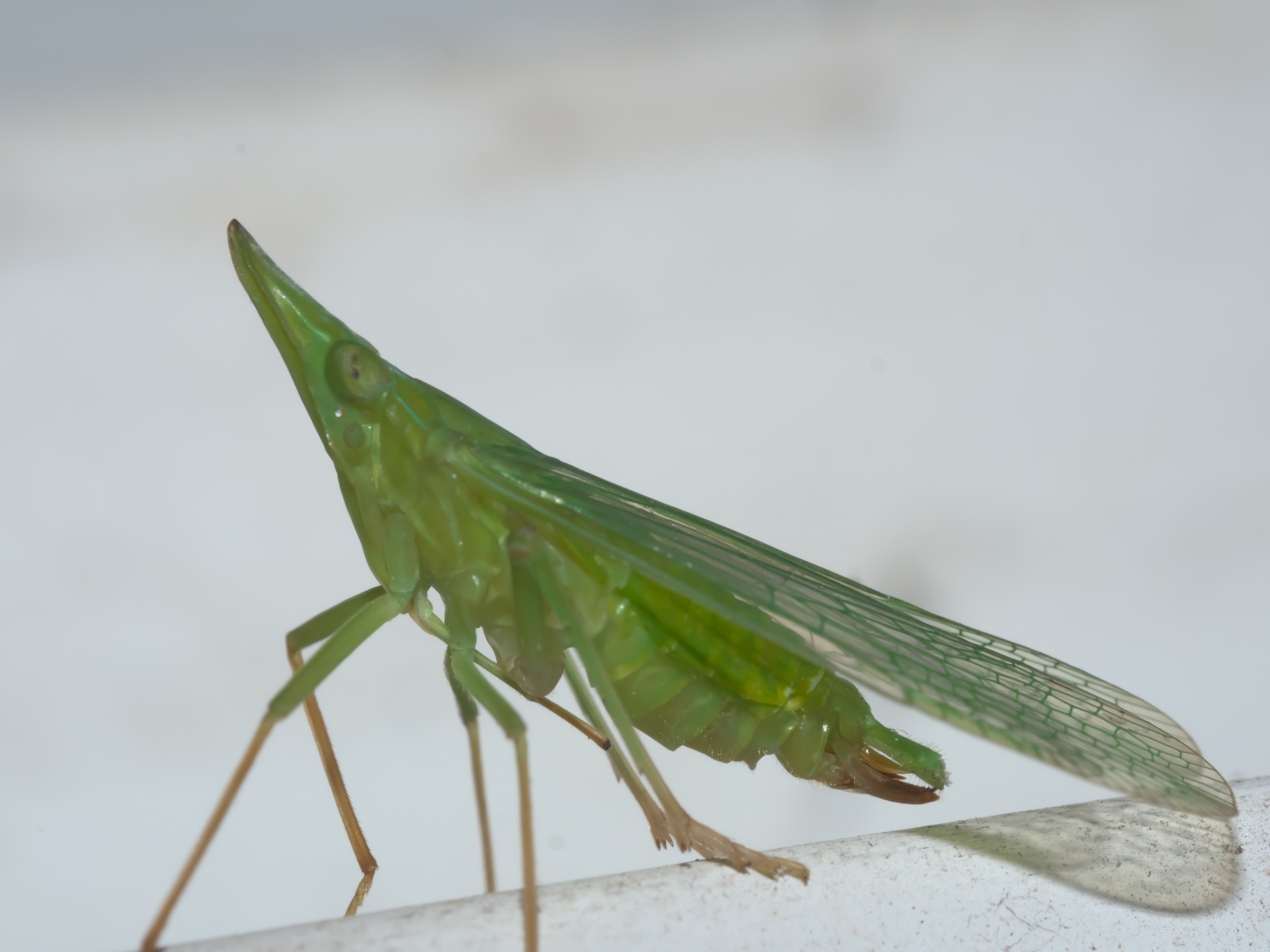
