= Scaralis inbio =

Scientific classification
- Kingdom: Animalia
- Phylum: Arthropoda
- Class: Insecta
- Order: Hemiptera
- Suborder: Auchenorrhyncha
- Infraorder: Fulgoromorpha
- Family: Fulgoridae
- Genus: Scaralis
- Species: S. inbio

Binomial name
- Scaralis inbio Yanega, 2024

Species of planthopper

Scaralis inbio is a species of fulgorid planthopper from Guatemala and Costa Rica. It is placed in a new subgenus Alphinoides.

== Description ==
Among the Central American Poiocerini, it can be distinguished by the line which is present at the anterior margin of the vertex. It has, in comparison to other Scaralis, relatively smaller area of its forewing pigmented.
