= Brasiliana =

Brasiliana may refer to:

- Brasiliana, general term for things, collections related to Brazil
- Brasiliana, a genus of planthoppers in the family Fulgoridae
- Brasiliana, a genus of birds in the family Trochilidae, synonym of Hylocharis
- Brasiliana, a genus of mites in the family Ixodidae, synonym of Amblyomma
