= Aracynthus (planthopper) =

Scientific classification
- Kingdom: Animalia
- Phylum: Arthropoda
- Class: Insecta
- Order: Hemiptera
- Suborder: Auchenorrhyncha
- Infraorder: Fulgoromorpha
- Family: Fulgoridae
- Tribe: Diloburini
- Genus: Aracynthus; Stål, 1866

Genus of planthoppers

Aracynthus is a genus of planthoppers in the family Fulgoridae, subfamily Poiocerinae. Species are distributed in South America, primarily Brazil.

== Species ==
- Aracynthus fulmineus Nast, 1950
- Aracynthus loicmatilei Bourgoin & Soulier-Perkins, 2001
- Aracynthus sanguineus (Olivier, 1791)
