= Japetus (planthopper) =

Scientific classification
- Kingdom: Animalia
- Phylum: Arthropoda
- Class: Insecta
- Order: Hemiptera
- Suborder: Auchenorrhyncha
- Infraorder: Fulgoromorpha
- Family: Fulgoridae
- Subfamily: Poiocerinae
- Genus: Japetus; Stål, 1863

Genus of planthoppers

Japetus is a genus of planthoppers in the family Fulgoridae, subfamily Poiocerinae. Species are distributed from Venezuela to Brazil.

== Species ==
- Japetus lichenus Bleuzen & Porion, 2004
- Japetus tostus (Stål, 1859)
