= Hypaepa (planthopper) =

Scientific classification
- Kingdom: Animalia
- Phylum: Arthropoda
- Class: Insecta
- Order: Hemiptera
- Suborder: Auchenorrhyncha
- Infraorder: Fulgoromorpha
- Family: Fulgoridae
- Tribe: Poiocerini
- Genus: Hypaepa; Stål, 1862

Genus of planthoppers

Hypaepa is a genus of planthoppers in the family Fulgoridae, subfamily Poiocerinae. Species are distributed in Central America.

== Species ==
- Hypaepa costata (Fabricius, 1803)
- Hypaepa diversa Distant, 1899
- Hypaepa illuminata Distant, 1887
- Hypaepa laetabilis (Walker, 1858)
- Hypaepa rosales (Lallemand, 1963)
- Hypaepa rubricata Distant, 1887
- Hypaepa rufifascia (Walker, 1851)
- Hypaepa transversalis Signoret, 1863
- Hypaepa zapotensis Distant, 1887
