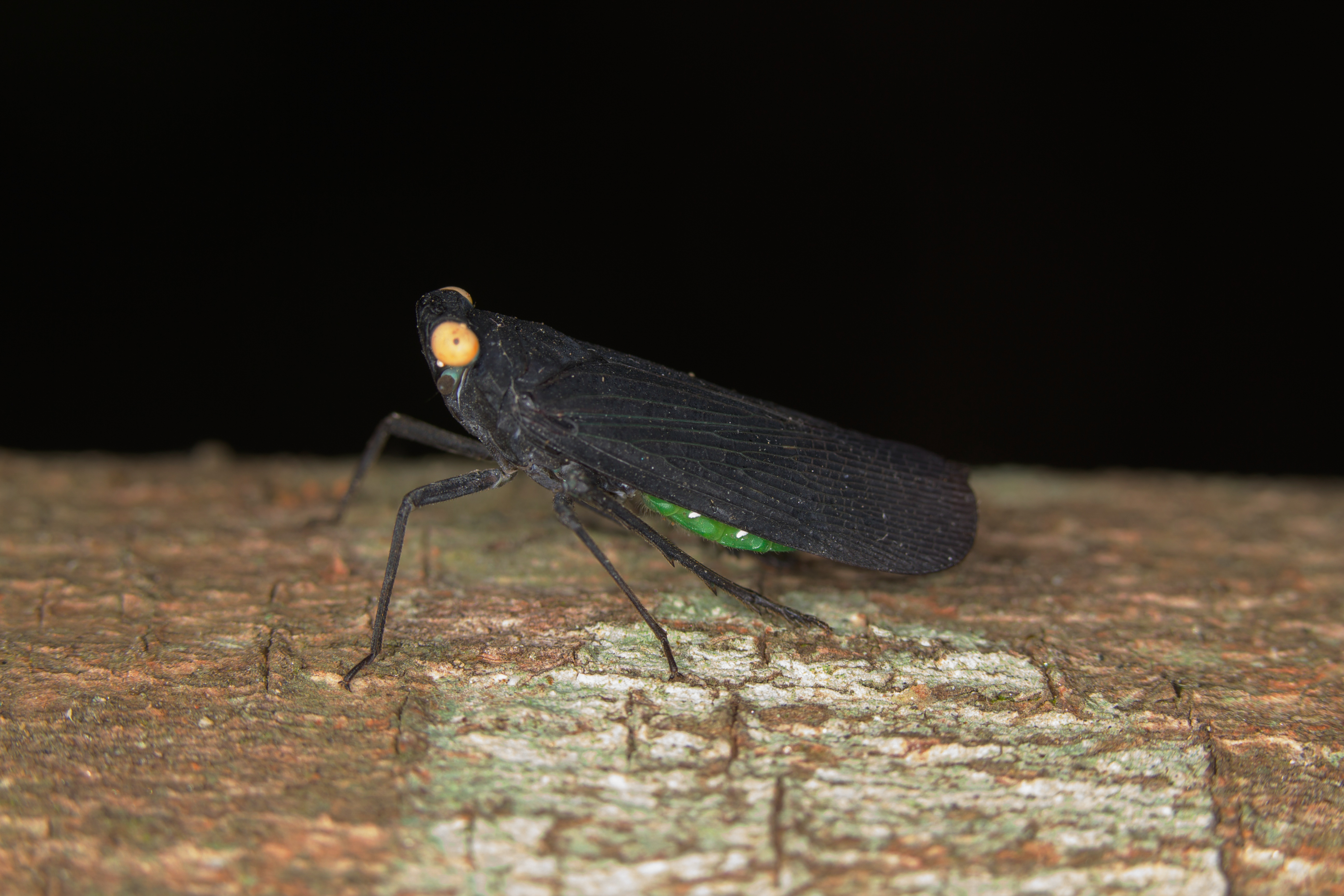
- Desudaba Psittacus (Black Planthopper)

Scientific classification
- Domain: Eukaryota
- Kingdom: Animalia
- Phylum: Arthropoda
- Class: Insecta
- Order: Hemiptera
- Suborder: Auchenorrhyncha
- Infraorder: Fulgoromorpha
- Family: Fulgoridae
- Subfamily: Poiocerinae
- Tribe: Poiocerini
- Genus: Desudaba; Walker, 1858

Synonyms
- Metanira Stål, 1863

= Desudaba (planthopper) =

Genus of planthoppers

Desudaba is a genus of bugs in the family Fulgoridae, tribe Poiocerini. Records are from Australia and New Guinea.

== Species ==
World Auchenorrhyncha Database lists:

- Desudaba aulica Stål, 1869
- Desudaba circe (Stål, 1863)
- Desudaba danae (Gerstaecker, 1895)
- Desudaba insularis Schmidt, 1911
- Desudaba maculata Distant, 1892
- Desudaba meridionalis Lallemand, 1928
- Desudaba modesta Jacobi, 1928
- Desudaba psittacus Walker, 1858 type species - type species
- Desudaba scylla Distant, 1888
