= Galela =

Galela may refer to:

- Galela (city), a small town and region on Halmahera island in Indonesia
- Galela language, a language in the West Papuan language family
- Galela (planthopper), a genus of insects
