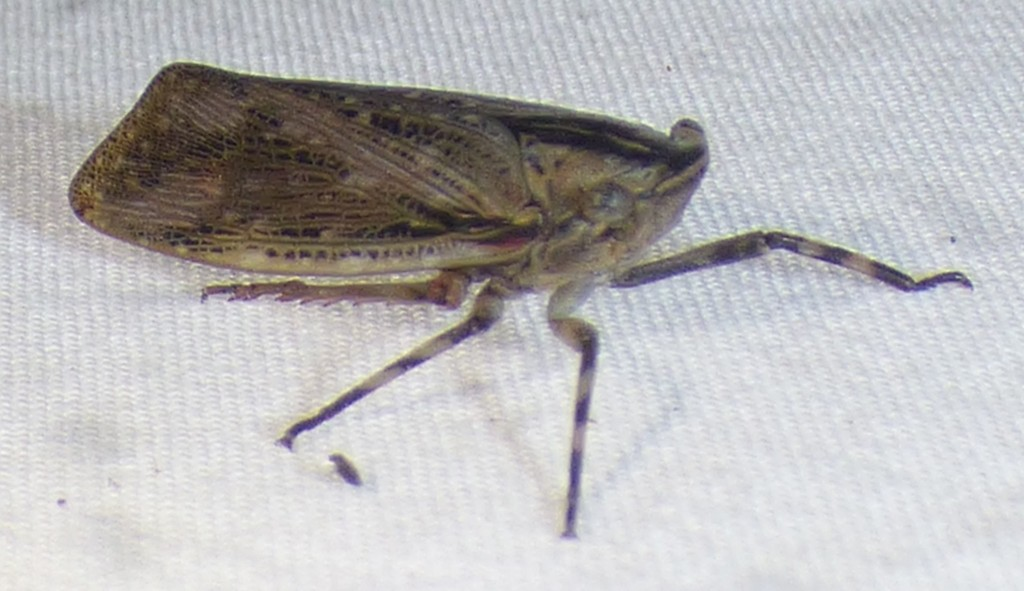

Scientific classification
- Kingdom: Animalia
- Phylum: Arthropoda
- Class: Insecta
- Order: Hemiptera
- Suborder: Auchenorrhyncha
- Infraorder: Fulgoromorpha
- Family: Fulgoridae
- Subfamily: Poiocerinae
- Tribe: Poiocerini
- Genus: Angulapteryx; Bartlett, 2025
- Species: A. texana

Binomial name
- Angulapteryx texana (Oman, 1936)

Synonyms
- Poblicia texana Oman, 1936

= Angulapteryx texana =

Species of insect

Angulapteryx texana is a planthopper native to the United States, described by Paul Wilson Oman in 1936. The generic placement of the species had been disputed, but a 2025 revision clarified that its former placement in Poblicia was erroneous, and placed it instead in its own genus, Angulapteryx.

== Description ==
Adult Angulapteryx texana are mostly grayish-tan in color with bold, brownish black bands extending from the head down to its back. The forewings have pinkish spots that appear in a mottled pattern. the legs are bicolored, being black and tan. The adults are 18-20 millimeters (0.71-0.79 inches) long. The nymphs are reddish-brown in color with a faint white band extending down the middle of the thorax. The head is rounded.

== Distribution and host plants ==
It is primarily found in Texas and Arkansas, but its range extends eastward to Virginia, and its host plants are species of juniper. Isolated records from Arizona and Mexico are considered to be potentially undescribed species in the genus.
