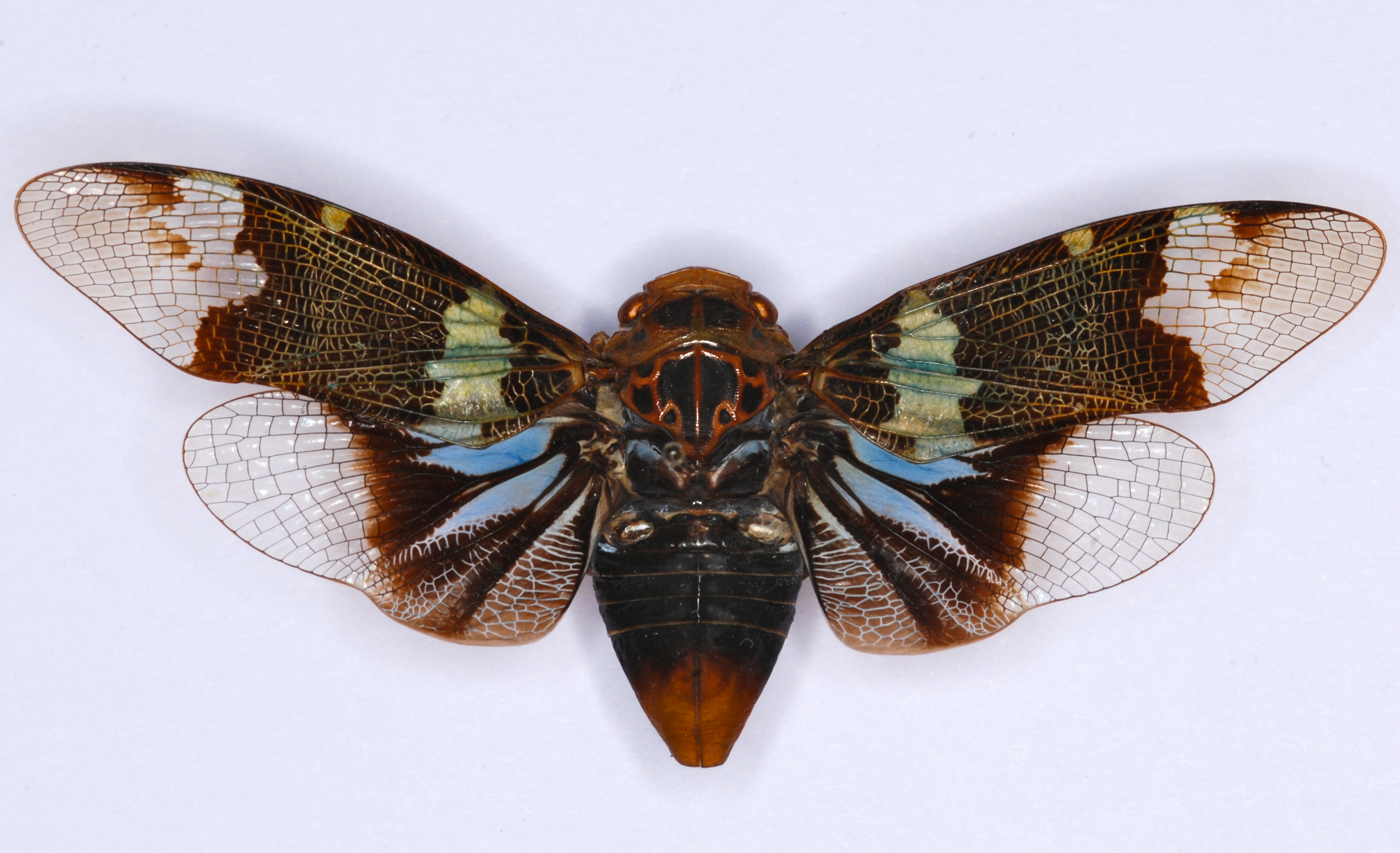

Scientific classification
- Kingdom: Animalia
- Phylum: Arthropoda
- Class: Insecta
- Order: Hemiptera
- Suborder: Auchenorrhyncha
- Infraorder: Fulgoromorpha
- Family: Fulgoridae
- Genus: Scaralis
- Species: S. versicolor

Binomial name
- Scaralis versicolor Distant, 1906

= Scaralis versicolor =

Species of planthopper

Scaralis versicolor is a species of fulgorid planthopper from South America, placed in the subgenus Scaralis.
