= Aliphera =

Scientific classification
- Domain: Eukaryota
- Kingdom: Animalia
- Phylum: Arthropoda
- Class: Insecta
- Order: Hemiptera
- Suborder: Auchenorrhyncha
- Infraorder: Fulgoromorpha
- Family: Fulgoridae
- Subfamily: Poiocerinae
- Tribe: Poiocerini
- Subtribe: Poiocerina
- Genus: Aliphera; Stål, 1866

Species
- Aliphera discrepans; Aliphera luctuosa; Aliphera marginalis

Genus of planthoppers

Aliphera is a genus of planthoppers in the family Fulgoridae.
