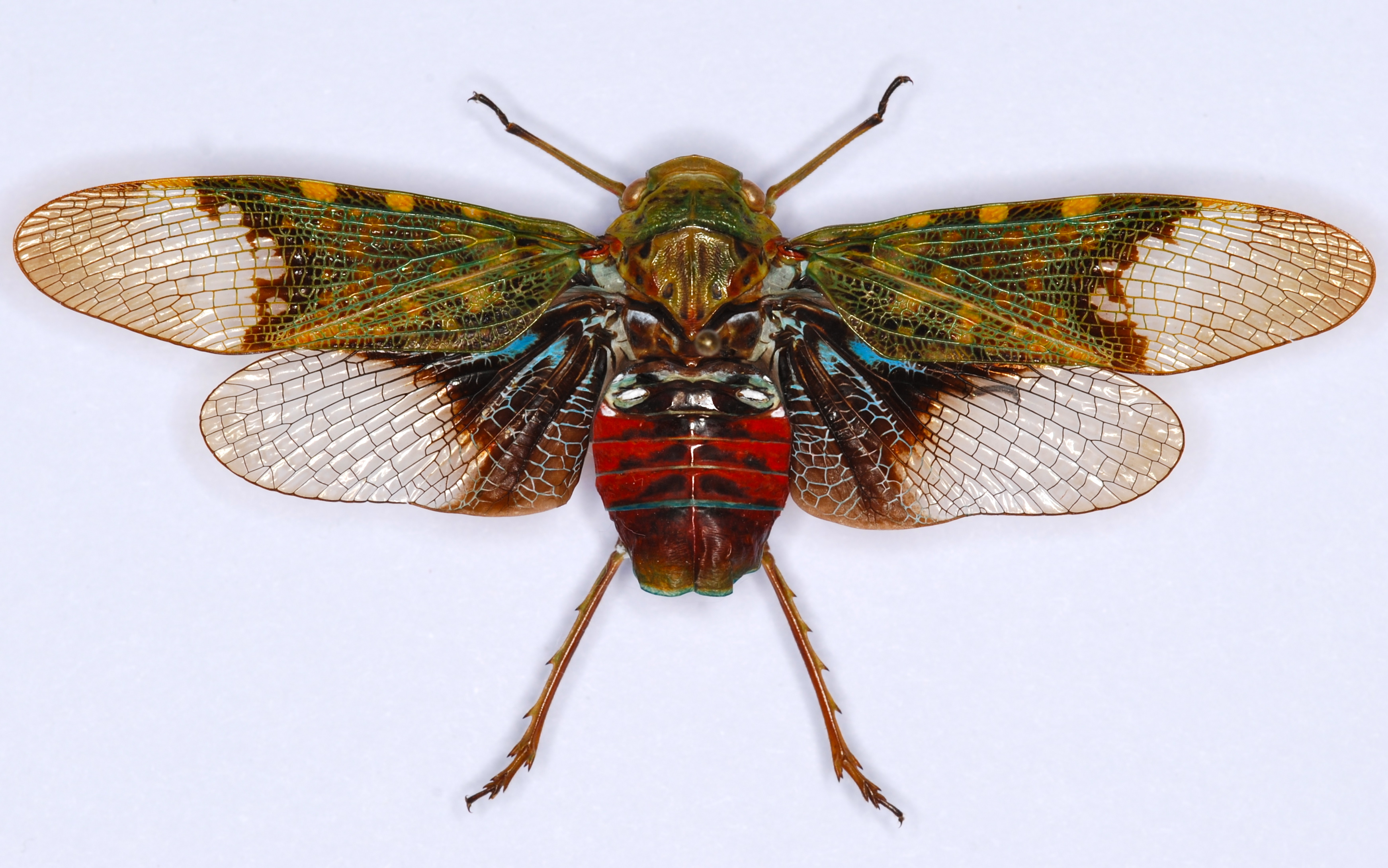

Scientific classification
- Kingdom: Animalia
- Phylum: Arthropoda
- Class: Insecta
- Order: Hemiptera
- Suborder: Auchenorrhyncha
- Infraorder: Fulgoromorpha
- Family: Fulgoridae
- Genus: Scaralis
- Species: S. neotropicalis

Binomial name
- Scaralis neotropicalis (Distant, 1887)

Synonyms
- Domitia neotropicalis Distant, 1887; Jamaicastes neotropicalis (Distant, 1887)

= Scaralis neotropicalis =

Species of planthopper

Scaralis neotropicalis is a species of fulgorid planthopper ranging from Mexico to South America, placed in the subgenus Scaralis.
