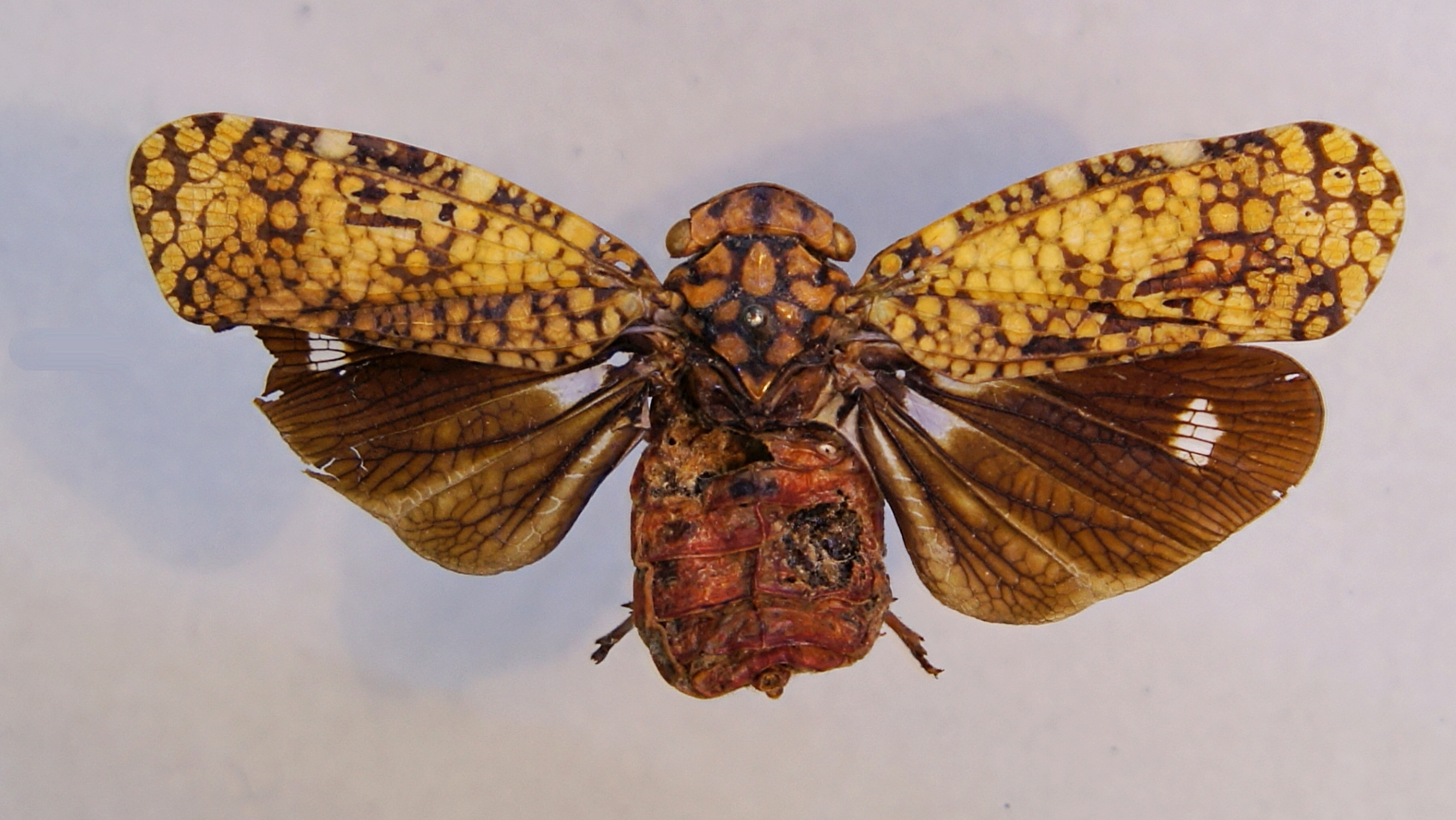
- Acmonia spilota

Scientific classification
- Kingdom: Animalia
- Phylum: Arthropoda
- Class: Insecta
- Order: Hemiptera
- Suborder: Auchenorrhyncha
- Infraorder: Fulgoromorpha
- Family: Fulgoridae
- Tribe: Poiocerini
- Genus: Acmonia; Stål, 1866

= Acmonia (planthopper) =

Genus of planthoppers

Acmonia is a genus of planthoppers in the family Fulgoridae, subfamily Poiocerinae. Species are distributed throughout Central America and South America.

== Species ==
- Acmonia aegrota (Gerstaecker, 1860)
- Acmonia amabilis (Gerstaecker, 1860)
- Acmonia amoena (Gerstaecker, 1860)
- Acmonia carbonaria (Gerstaecker, 1860)
- Acmonia crowleyi Distant, 1906
- Acmonia dichroa (Germar, 1830)
- Acmonia ficta (Walker, 1858)
- Acmonia nigriceps Lallemand, 1960
- Acmonia procris Distant, 1887
- Acmonia punctata Lallemand, 1959
- Acmonia sanguinalis Distant, 1905
- Acmonia sanguinolenta (Blanchard, 1845)
- Acmonia sepulchralis (Stål, 1855)
- Acmonia spilota (Germar, 1830)
- Acmonia trivia Distant, 1887
