= Calyptoproctus elegans =

Scientific classification
- Domain: Eukaryota
- Kingdom: Animalia
- Phylum: Arthropoda
- Class: Insecta
- Order: Hemiptera
- Suborder: Auchenorrhyncha
- Infraorder: Fulgoromorpha
- Family: Fulgoridae
- Genus: Calyptoproctus
- Species: C. elegans

Binomial name
- Calyptoproctus elegans (Olivier, 1791)

Synonyms
- Fulgora elegans Olivier, 1791

Species of planthopper

Calyptoproctus elegans is a species of planthopper in the family Fulgoridae. It is found from Brazil north to Honduras.
