= Codon (disambiguation) =

A codon is a three-base sequence of DNA that encodes a single amino acid in the genetic code

Codon may also refer to:

- Codon (plant), a genus of plants in the family Boraginaceae
- Codon (planthopper), a genus of insects in the family Fulgoridae
