= Obia =

Obia or OBIA may refer to:

- Obia, a Neotropical genus of planthoppers
- Obia (folklore), also spelt obeah, a monster in West African folklore
- Obeah, an indigenous group of African storytellers that survive in the West Indies
- Object-Based Image Analysis
