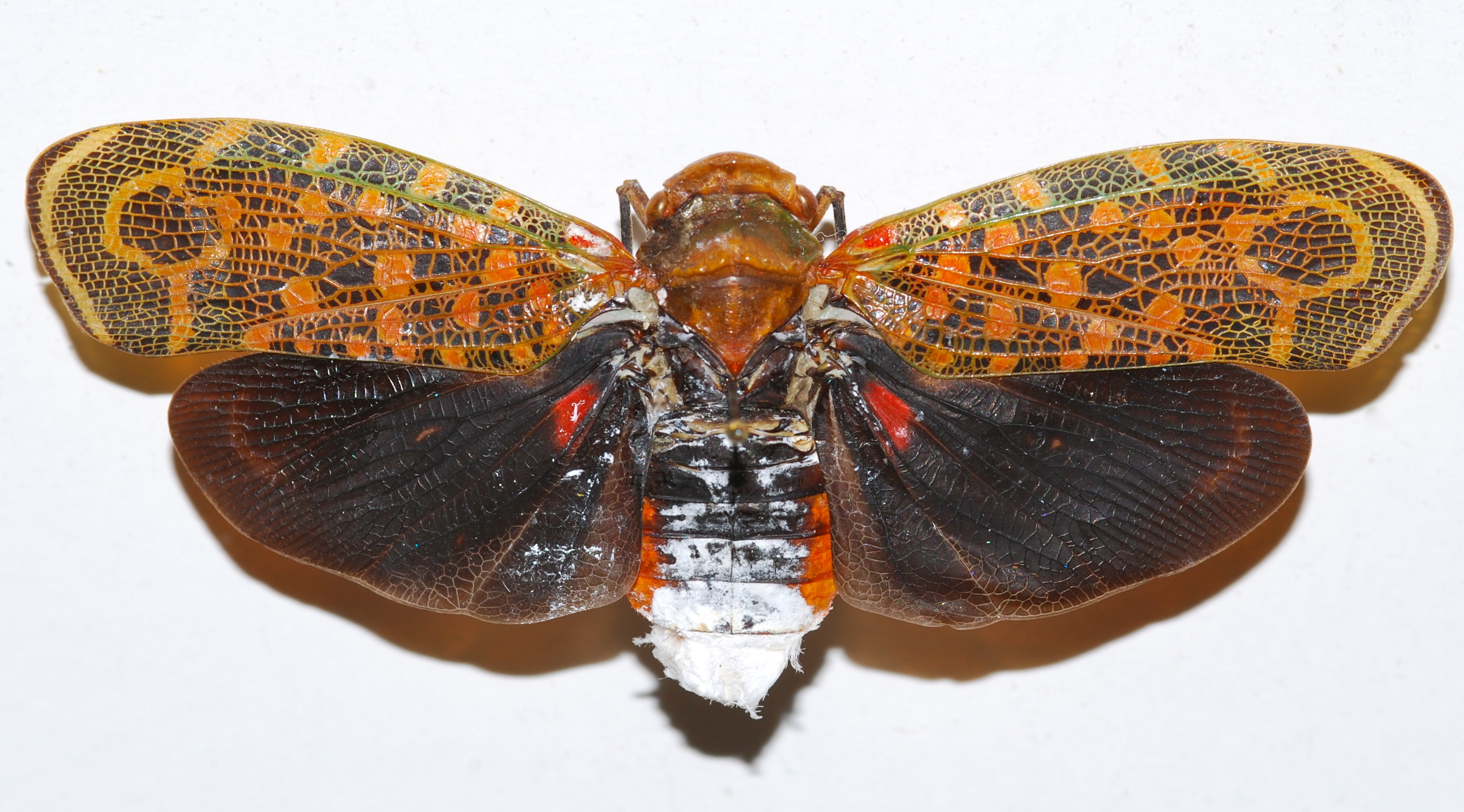
- Auchalea pandora (Peru)

Scientific classification
- Kingdom: Animalia
- Phylum: Arthropoda
- Class: Insecta
- Order: Hemiptera
- Suborder: Auchenorrhyncha
- Infraorder: Fulgoromorpha
- Family: Fulgoridae
- Subfamily: Poiocerinae; Haupt, 1929

Tribes and genera
- See text

Synonyms
- Lystrinae

= Poiocerinae =

Subfamily of planthoppers

The subfamily Poiocerinae include Hemipteran insects in the family Fulgoridae, found especially in the tropics.

== Tribes and genera ==
The Fulgoromorpha Lists On the Web (FLOW) includes four tribes:

=== Diloburini ===
Auth. Metcalf, 1938 (central & South America)

- Aracynthus Stål, 1866
- Dilobura Spinola, 1839
- Echetra Walker, 1858
- Episcius Spinola, 1839
- Japetus Stål, 1863
- Obia Distant, 1887
- Zepasa Distant, 1906

=== Lystrini ===
Auth. Spinola, 1839 - Americas

- Lystra Fabricius, 1803
- Lystrenia Fennah & Carvalho, 1963

=== Paralystrini ===
Auth. Metcalf, 1938 (South America)

- Paralystra White, 1846

=== Poiocerini ===
Auth. Haupt, 1929 (Americas, Asia, Australasia; former subtribes no longer recognized)

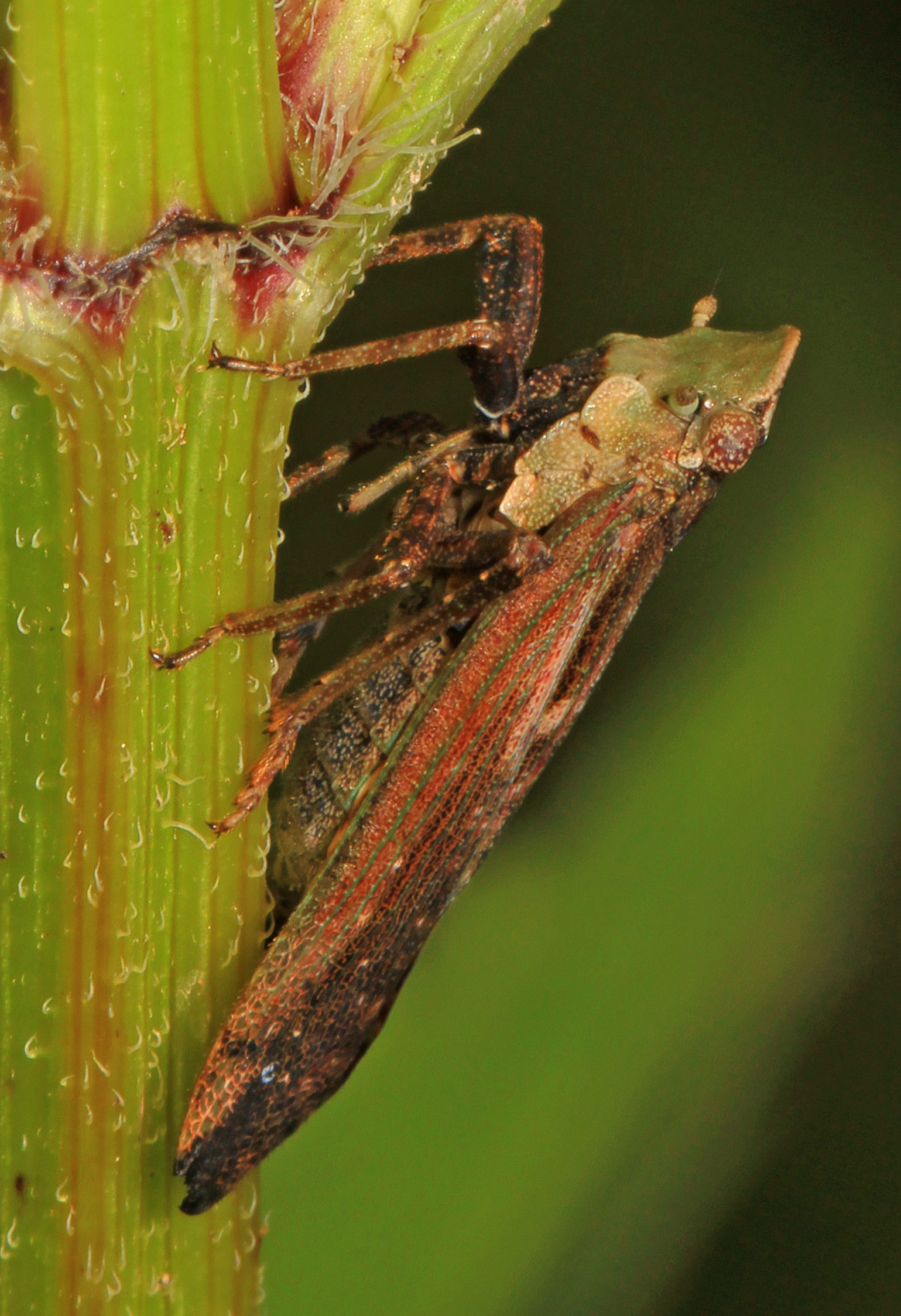
Cyrpoptus sp.

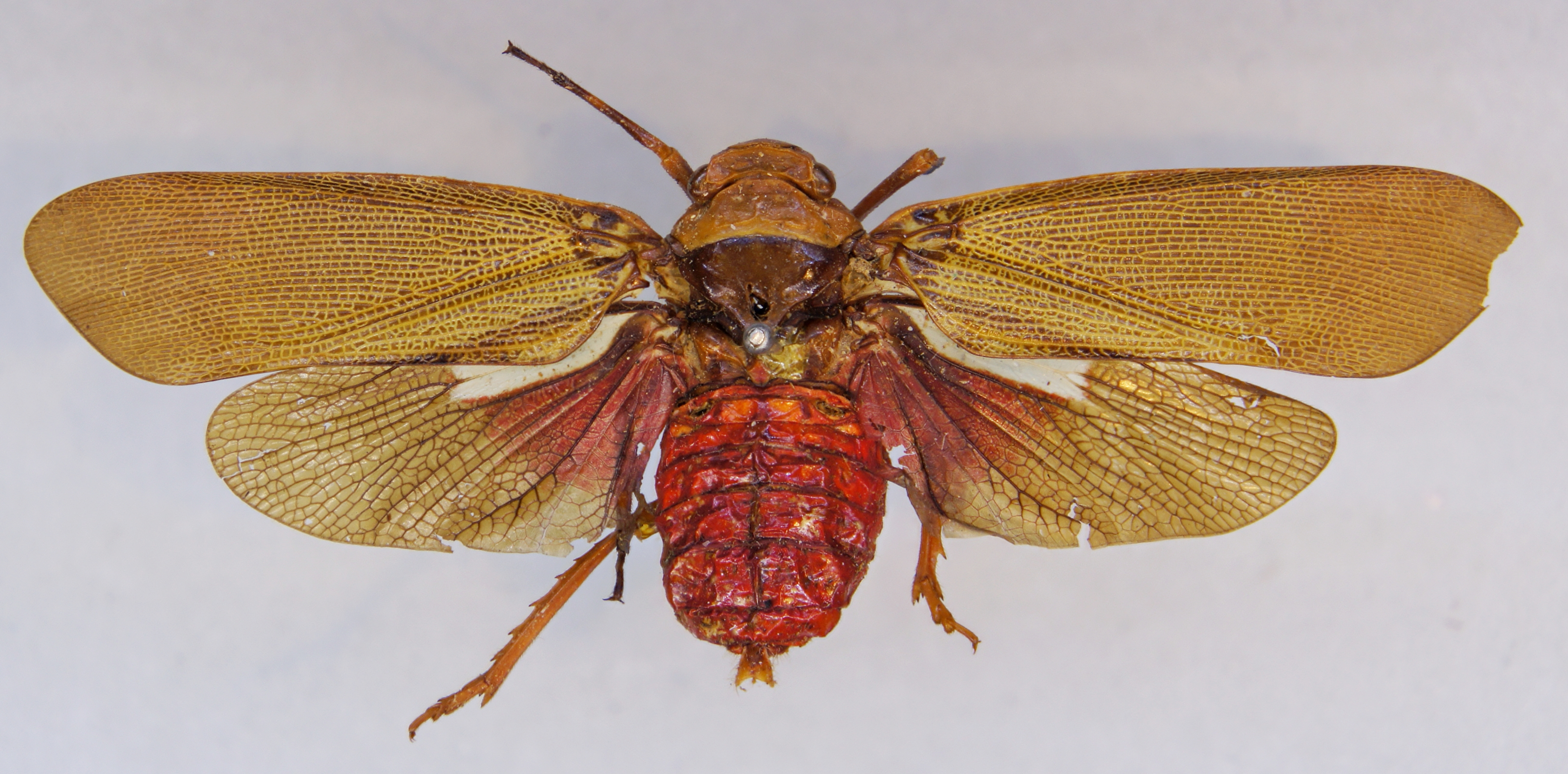
Polydictya basalis

- Aburia Stål, 1866
- Acmonia Stål, 1866
- Acraephia Stål, 1866
- Alaruasa Distant, 1906
- Aliphera Stål, 1866
- Alphina Stål, 1863
- Amantia Stål, 1864
- Angulapteryx Bartlett, 2025
- Auchalea Gerstaecker, 1895
- Birdantis Stål, 1863
- Brasiliana Lallemand, 1959
- Calyptoproctus Spinola, 1839
- Coptopola Stål, 1869
- Crepusia Stål, 1866
- Curetia Stål, 1862
- Cyrpoptus Stål, 1862
- Desudaba Walker, 1858
- Desudaboides Musgrave, 1927
- Erilla Distant, 1906
- Florichisme Kirkaldy, 1904
- Galela Distant, 1906
- Gebenna Stål, 1863
- Hypaepa Stål, 1862
- Itzalana Distant, 1905
- Jamaicastes Kirkaldy, 1900
- Kutariana Nast, 1950
- Learcha Stål, 1863
- Matacosa Distant, 1906
- Oeagra Stål, 1863
- Oomima Berg, 1879
- Poblicia Stål, 1866
- Poiocera De Laporte, 1832 (type genus)
- Polydictya Guérin-Méneville, 1844
- Scaralis Stål, 1863
- Scaralina Yanega, 2024
- Tabocasa Distant, 1906
- Talloisia Lallemand, 1959
- Zeunasa Distant, 1906

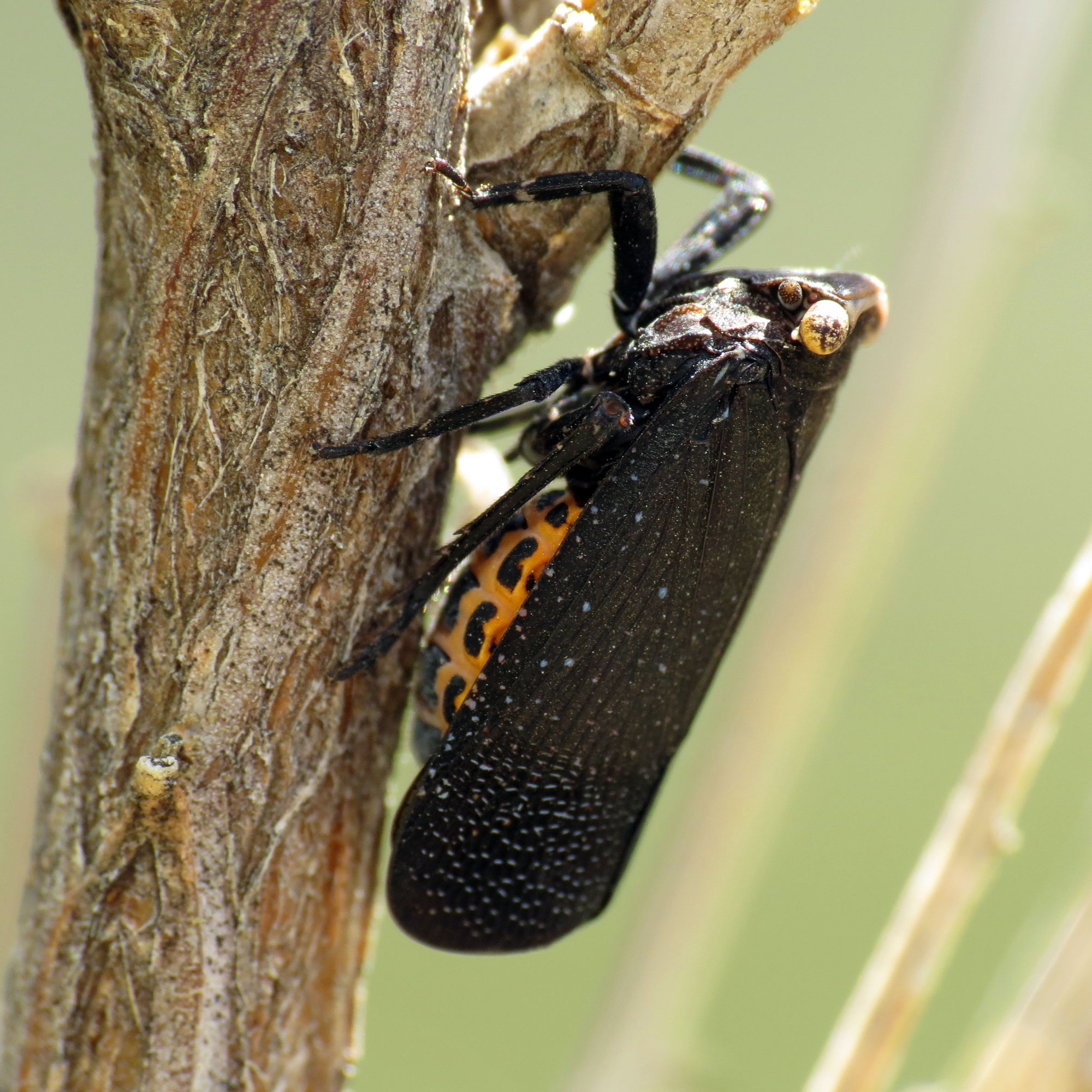
Poblicia fuliginosa (USA)
