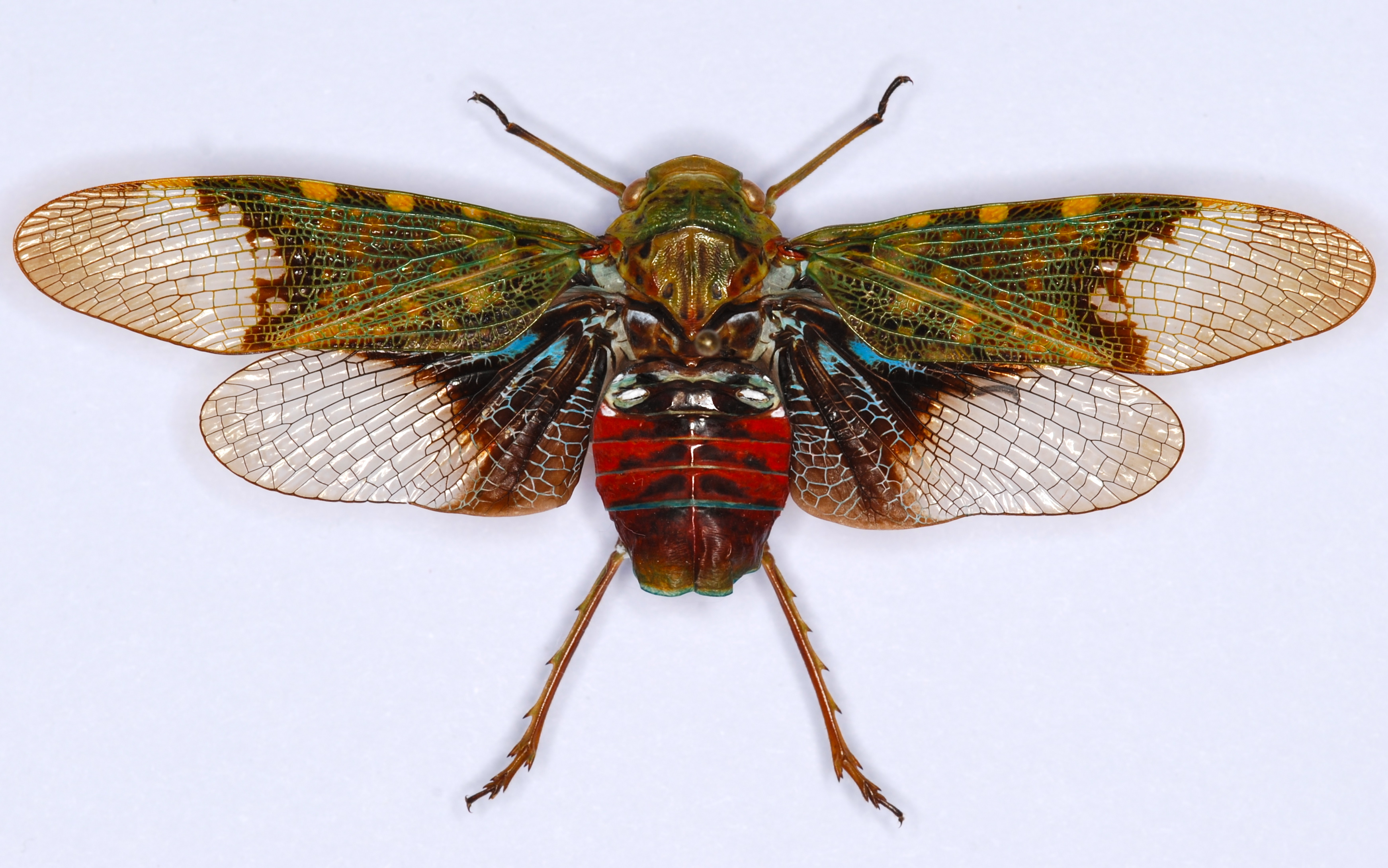
- Scaralis neotropicalis

Scientific classification
- Kingdom: Animalia
- Phylum: Arthropoda
- Class: Insecta
- Order: Hemiptera
- Suborder: Auchenorrhyncha
- Infraorder: Fulgoromorpha
- Family: Fulgoridae
- Subfamily: Poiocerinae
- Tribe: Poiocerini
- Genus: Scaralis; Stål, 1863

Type species
- Lystra picta Germar, 1830

= Scaralis =

Genus of planthoppers

Scaralis is a genus of planthoppers in the family Fulgoridae occurring in Central America and South America. The genus contains 13 species, placed into two subgenera.

== Species ==
=== Subgenus Scaralis (Scaralis) ===
- Scaralis corallina (Gerstaecker, 1860)
- Scaralis neotropicalis (Distant, 1887)
- Scaralis obscura (Distant, 1887)
- Scaralis picta (Germar, 1830) - type species
- Scaralis puella Stål, 1863
- Scaralis semiclara (Stål, 1862)
- Scaralis versicolor Distant, 1906

=== Subgenus Scaralis (Alphinoides) ===
- Scaralis fluvialis Lallemand, 1956
- Scaralis inbio Yanega, 2024
- Scaralis nigronotata Stål, 1863
- Scaralis quadricolor (Walker, 1858)
- Scaralis semilimpida (Walker, 1851)
- Scaralis spectabilis (Walker, 1858)
