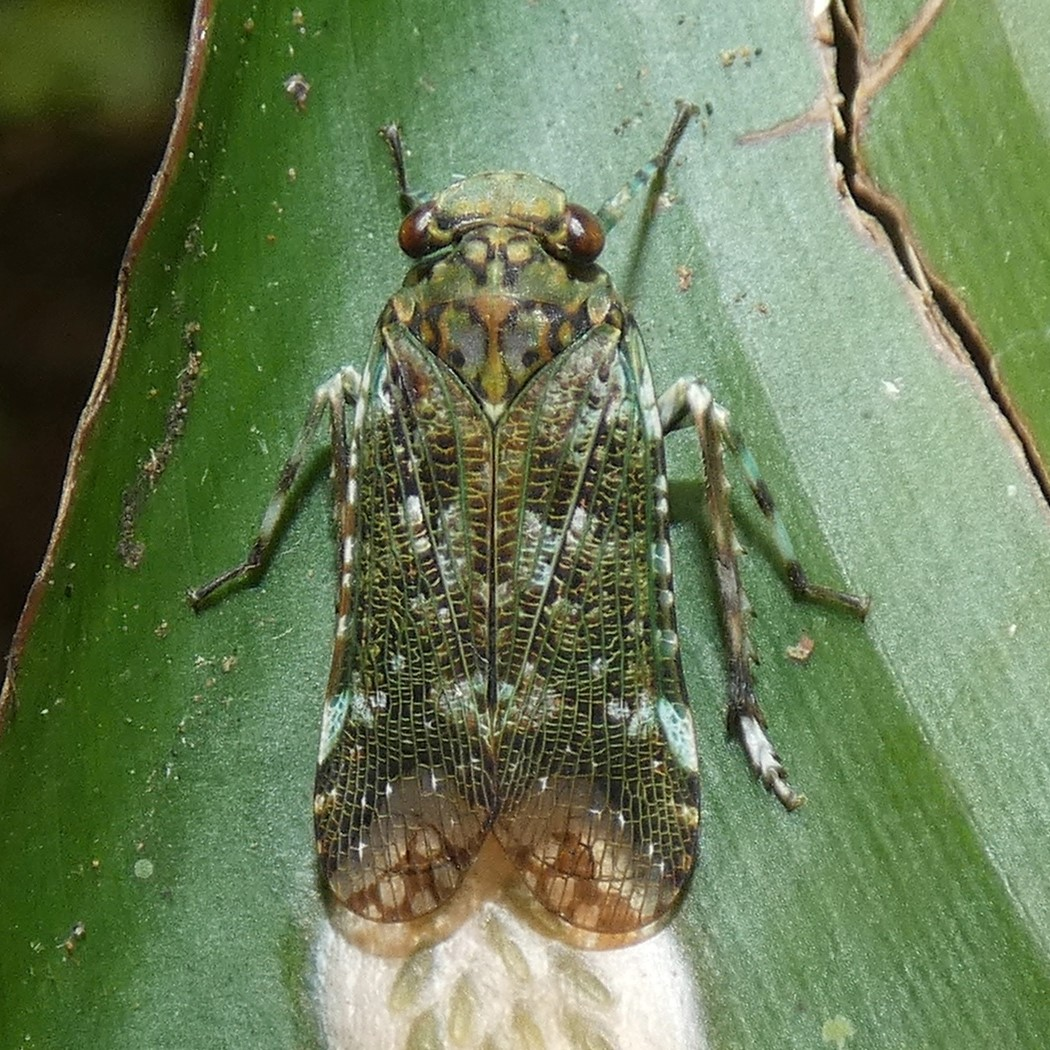
- Alphina nigrosignata

Scientific classification
- Kingdom: Animalia
- Phylum: Arthropoda
- Clade: Pancrustacea
- Class: Insecta
- Order: Hemiptera
- Suborder: Auchenorrhyncha
- Infraorder: Fulgoromorpha
- Family: Fulgoridae
- Subfamily: Poiocerinae
- Tribe: Poiocerini
- Genus: Alphina; Stål, 1863

Type species
- Alphina nigrosignata Stål, 1863

= Alphina =

Genus of planthoppers

Alphina is a genus of planthoppers in the family Fulgoridae. Species of the genus are found in South America.

== Species ==
- Alphina nigrosignata Stål, 1863
- Alphina fryi Distant, 1906

=== Formerly included ===
- Alphina glauca (Metcalf, 1923); a synonym of Scaralina marmorata
