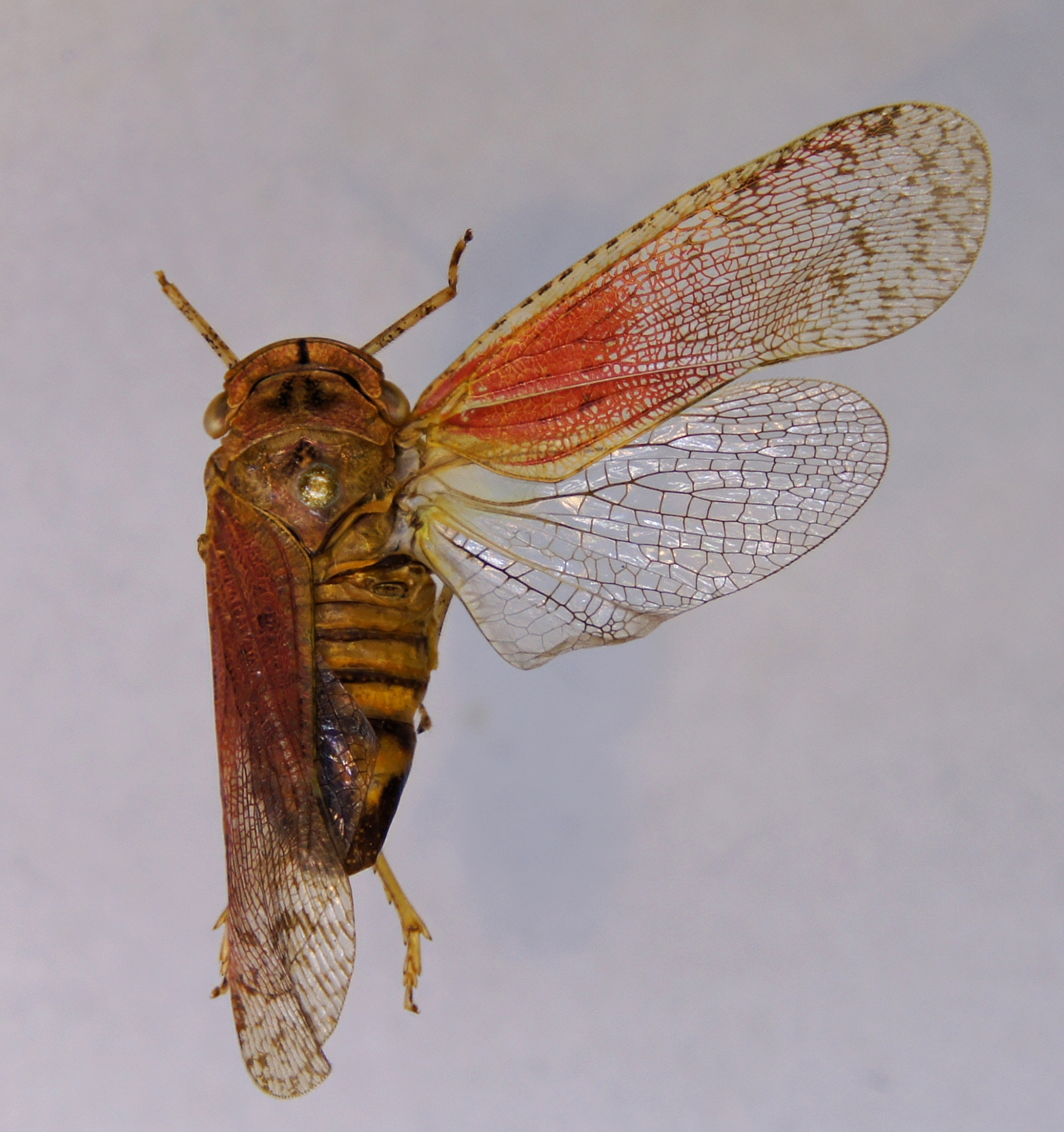
- Calyptoproctus fuscipennis Distant, 1906, Peru, Panguana

Scientific classification
- Domain: Eukaryota
- Kingdom: Animalia
- Phylum: Arthropoda
- Class: Insecta
- Order: Hemiptera
- Suborder: Auchenorrhyncha
- Infraorder: Fulgoromorpha
- Family: Fulgoridae
- Subfamily: Poiocerinae
- Tribe: Poiocerini
- Genus: Calyptoproctus; Spinola, 1839

Type species
- Calyptoproctus elegans Olivier, 1788

= Calyptoproctus =

Genus of planthoppers

Calyptoproctus is a genus of planthoppers in the family Fulgoridae; records are from Central and South America.

== Species ==
World Auchenorrhyncha Database lists:

- Calyptoproctus aridus Stål, 1869
- Calyptoproctus coloratus Distant, 1906
- Calyptoproctus confusus Distant, 1906
- Calyptoproctus elegans (Olivier, 1791) - type species
- Calyptoproctus exsiccatus (Stål, 1854)
- Calyptoproctus fuscipennis Distant, 1906
- Calyptoproctus guttipes (Walker, 1858)
- Calyptoproctus stigma (Fabricius, 1803)
- Calyptoproctus weyrauchi Lallemand, 1956

=== Formerly included ===
- Calyptoproctus marmoratus Spinola, 1839; now classified as Scaralina marmorata
