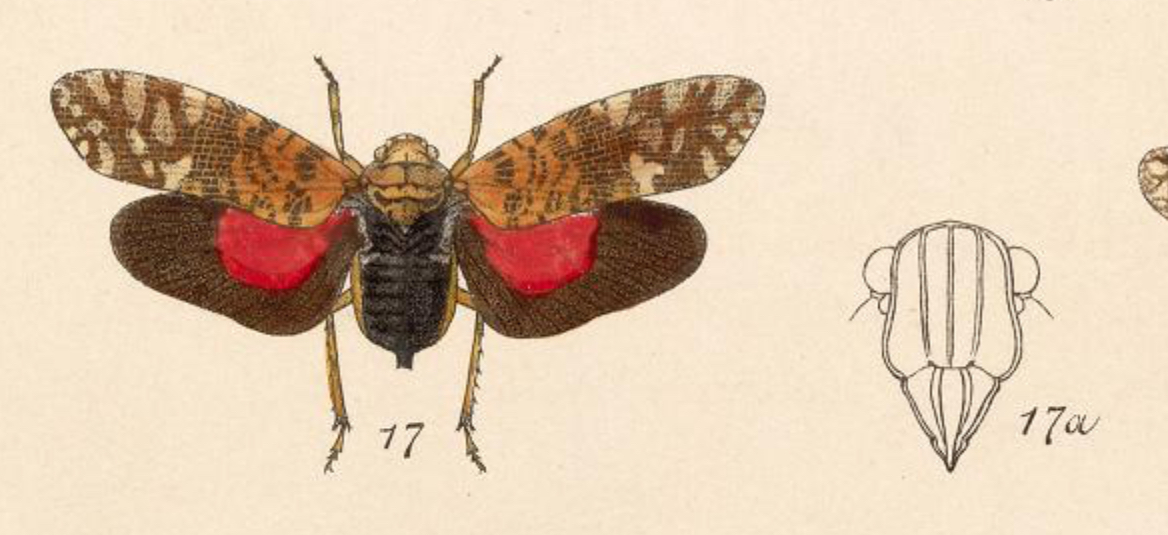
- Obia tenebrosa in Distant & Fowler 1887

Scientific classification
- Domain: Eukaryota
- Kingdom: Animalia
- Phylum: Arthropoda
- Class: Insecta
- Order: Hemiptera
- Suborder: Auchenorrhyncha
- Infraorder: Fulgoromorpha
- Family: Fulgoridae
- Subfamily: Poiocerinae
- Genus: Obia; Distant, 1887
- Species: O. tenebrosa

Binomial name
- Obia tenebrosa Distant, 1887

= Obia tenebrosa =

Genus of planthoppers

Obia is a monotypic genus of planthopper in the family Fulgoridae, presently comprising a single species Obia tenebrosa, known from Mexico.
