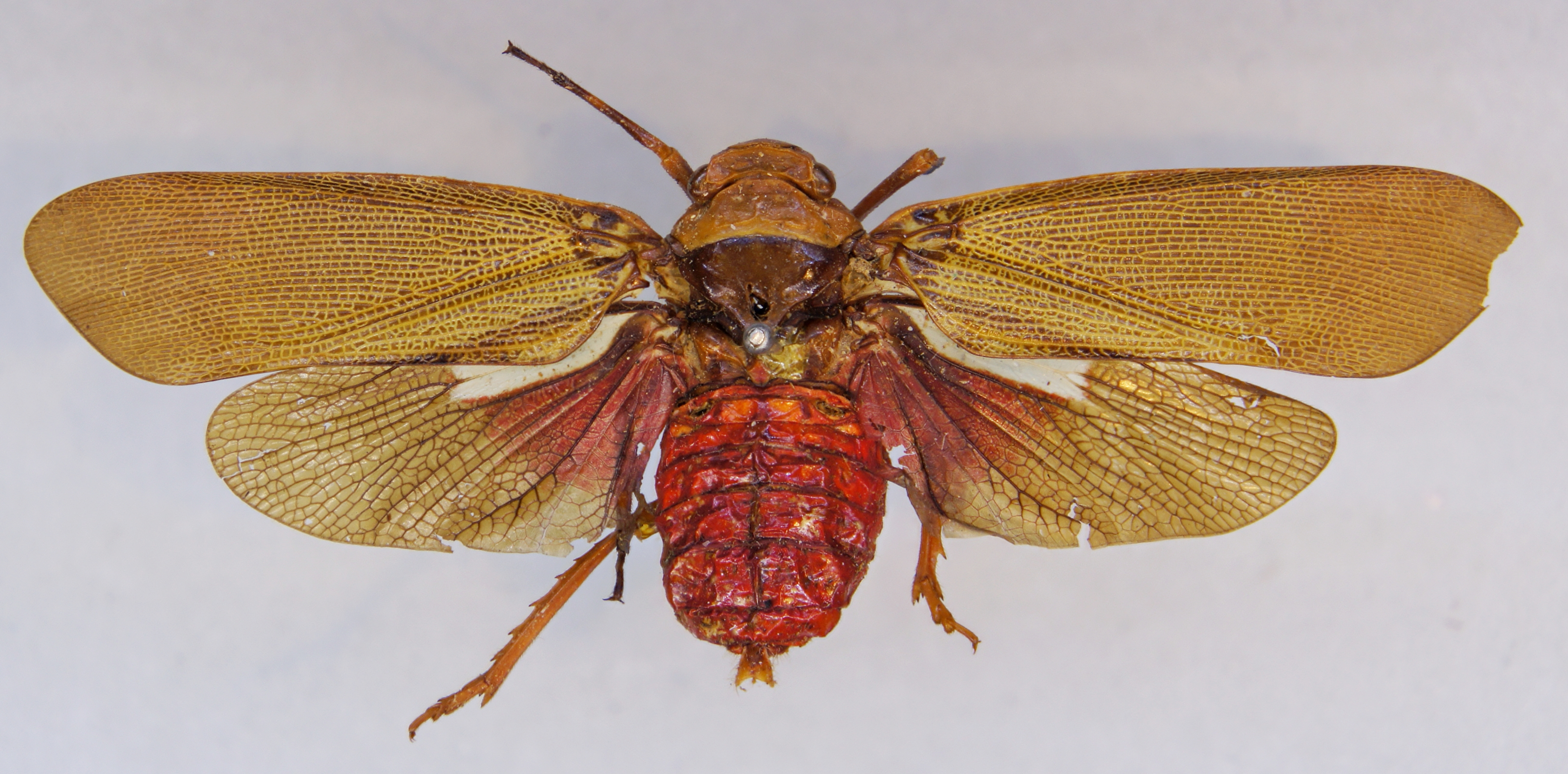
- Polydictya basalis

Scientific classification
- Kingdom: Animalia
- Phylum: Arthropoda
- Clade: Pancrustacea
- Class: Insecta
- Order: Hemiptera
- Suborder: Auchenorrhyncha
- Infraorder: Fulgoromorpha
- Family: Fulgoridae
- Tribe: Poiocerini
- Genus: Polydictya; Guérin-Méneville, 1844
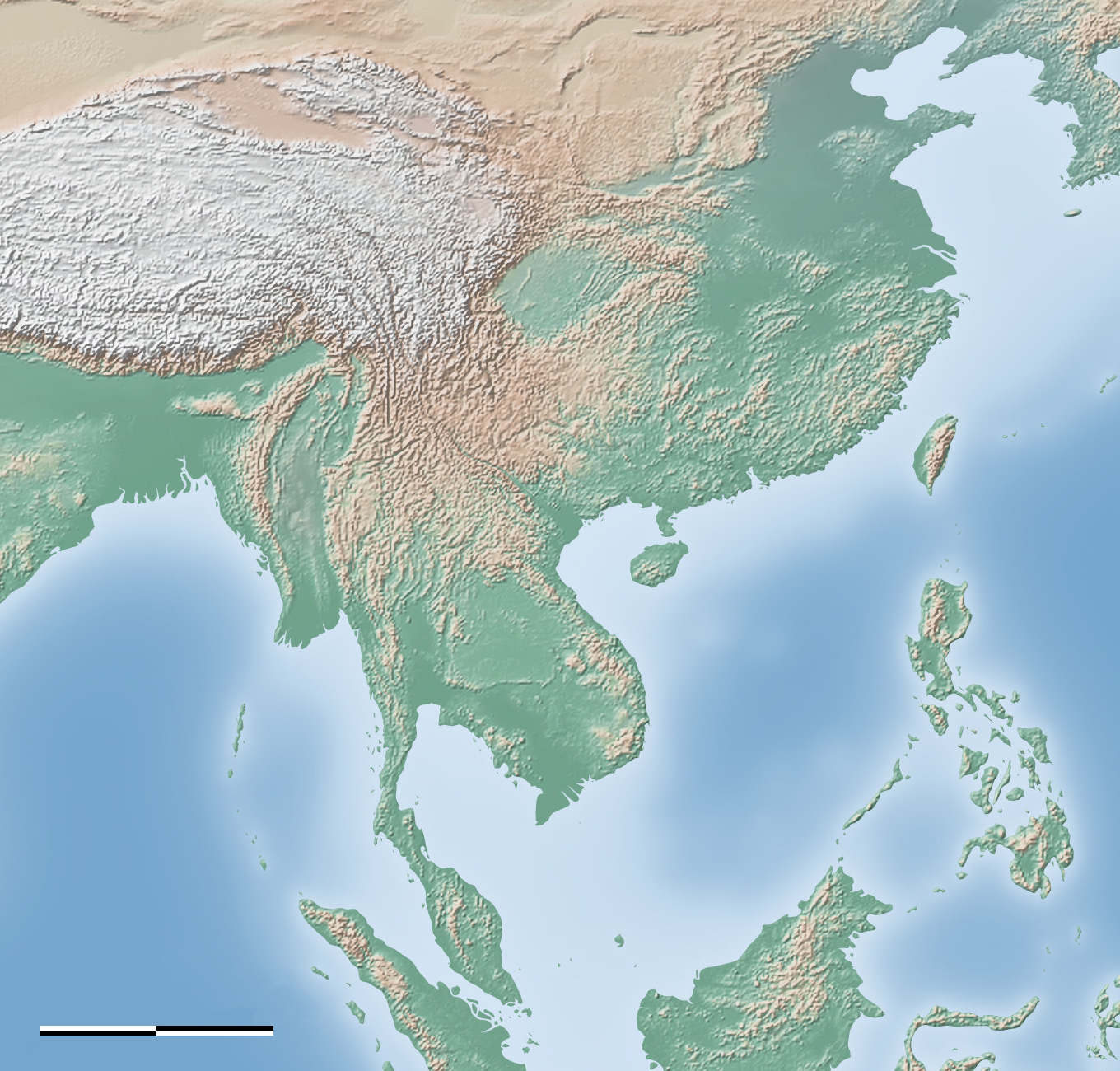
- Range: see WAD

Synonyms
- Thaumastodictya Kirkaldy, 1902

= Polydictya =

Genus of planthoppers

Polydictya is a genus of planthoppers in the sub-family Poiocerinae Haupt, 1929. Species are distributed from India, through Indo-China, to Malesia.

== Species ==
The following described species are accepted:

1. Polydictya affinis Atkinson, 1889
2. Polydictya bantimurung Constant, 2015
3. Polydictya barclayi Constant, 2016
4. Polydictya basalis (Hope, 1843) - type species
5. Polydictya basirubra Constant, 2015
6. Polydictya bhaskarai Constant, 2024
7. Polydictya chantrainei Nagai & Porion, 2004
8. Polydictya chewi Nagai & Porion, 2004
9. Polydictya crassa Distant, 1906
10. Polydictya draysapensis Constant & Pham, 2019
11. Polydictya drumonti Constant & Pham, 2017
12. Polydictya duffelsi Constant, 2009
13. Polydictya grootaerti Constant & Pham, 2017
14. Polydictya illuminata Distant, 1906
15. Polydictya jakli Constant, 2016
16. Polydictya javanensis Schmidt, 1910
17. Polydictya johannae Lallemand, 1956
18. Polydictya katsurakoae Nagai & Porion, 1996
19. Polydictya khmera Constant & Pham, 2019
20. Polydictya kuntzi Nagai & Porion, 2004
21. Polydictya laotiana Constant & Pham, 2019
22. Polydictya lombokana Constant, 2010
23. Polydictya nami Constant & Pham, 2019
24. Polydictya negrito Distant, 1906
25. Polydictya nigrifrons Constant & Pham, 2019
26. Polydictya ornata Chew Kea Foo, Porion & Audibert, 2010
27. Polydictya pantherina Gerstaecker, 1895
28. Polydictya pelengana Constant, 2015
29. Polydictya robusta Gerstaecker, 1895
30. Polydictya rufifrons Schmidt, 1910
31. Polydictya sumatrana Schmidt, 1910
32. Polydictya tanjiewhoei Bosuang, Audibert & Porion, 2015
33. Polydictya thanatos Chew Kea Foo, Porion & Audibert, 2010
34. Polydictya thompsoni Constant & Pham, 2019
35. Polydictya tricolor (Westwood, 1845)
36. Polydictya triumphalis Bosuang, Audibert & Porion, 2015
37. Polydictya uniformis (Walker, 1857)
38. Polydictya vietnamica Constant & Pham, 2008
