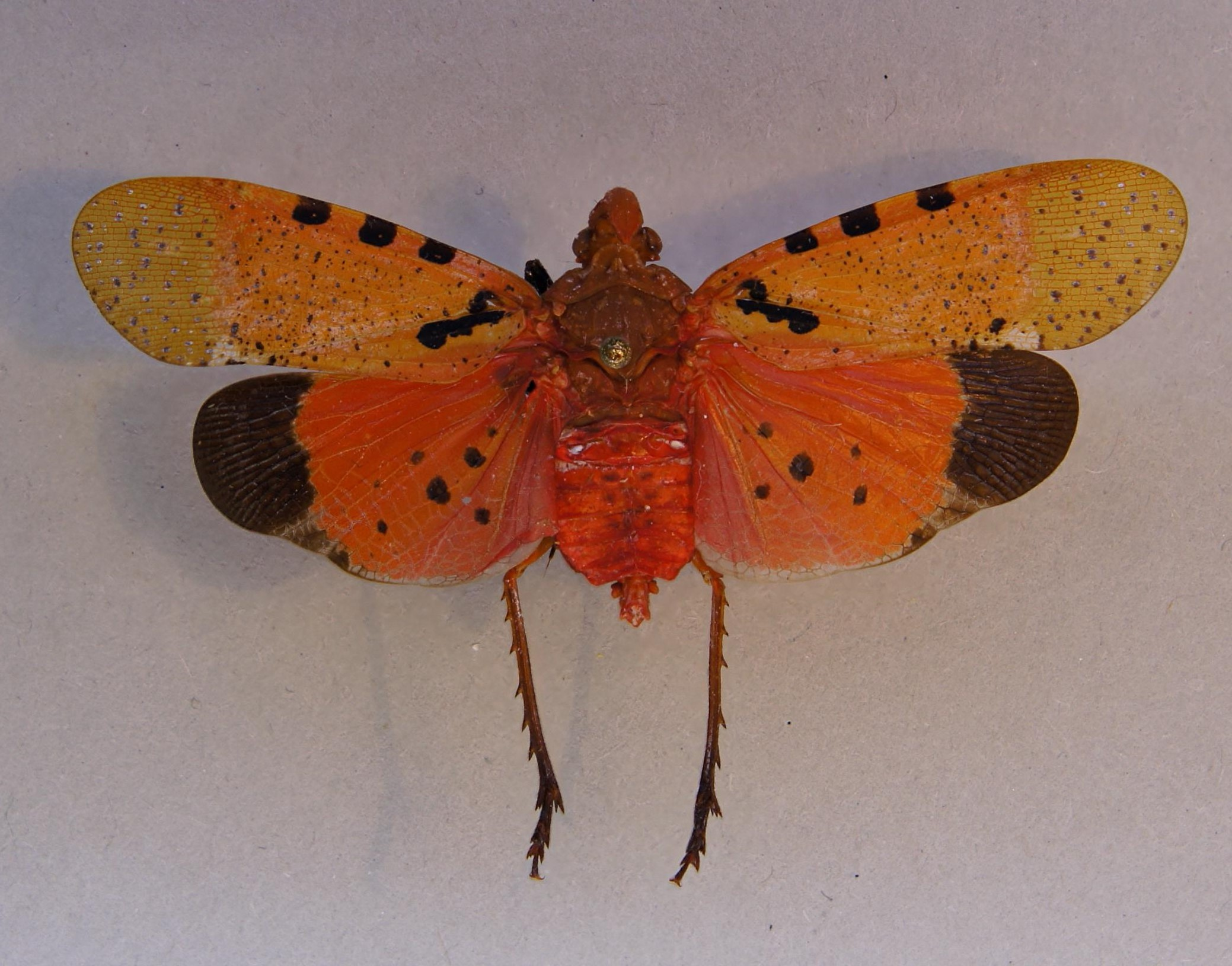
- Belbina lambertoni

Scientific classification
- Kingdom: Animalia
- Phylum: Arthropoda
- Clade: Pancrustacea
- Class: Insecta
- Order: Hemiptera
- Suborder: Auchenorrhyncha
- Infraorder: Fulgoromorpha
- Family: Fulgoridae
- Subfamily: Enchophorinae
- Genus: Belbina; Stål, 1863

Synonyms
- Cornelia Stål, 1866

= Belbina =

Genus of planthoppers

Belbina is a genus of planthoppers in the subfamily Enchophorinae (Fulgoridae): erected by Carl Stål in 1863; There are some 12 species presently known, occurring in Madagascar.

== Species ==
1. Belbina bergrothi (Schmidt, 1911)
2. Belbina bloetei Lallemand, 1959
3. Belbina bourgoini Constant, 2014
4. Belbina falleni Stål, 1863 - type species
5. Belbina foliacea Lallemand, 1959
6. Belbina laetitiae Constant, 2014
7. Belbina lambertoni Lallemand, 1922
8. Belbina madagascariensis (Westwood, 1851)
9. Belbina nympha (Stål, 1866)
10. Belbina pionneaui Lallemand, 1922
11. Belbina recurva Lallemand, 1950
12. Belbina servillei (Spinola, 1839)
