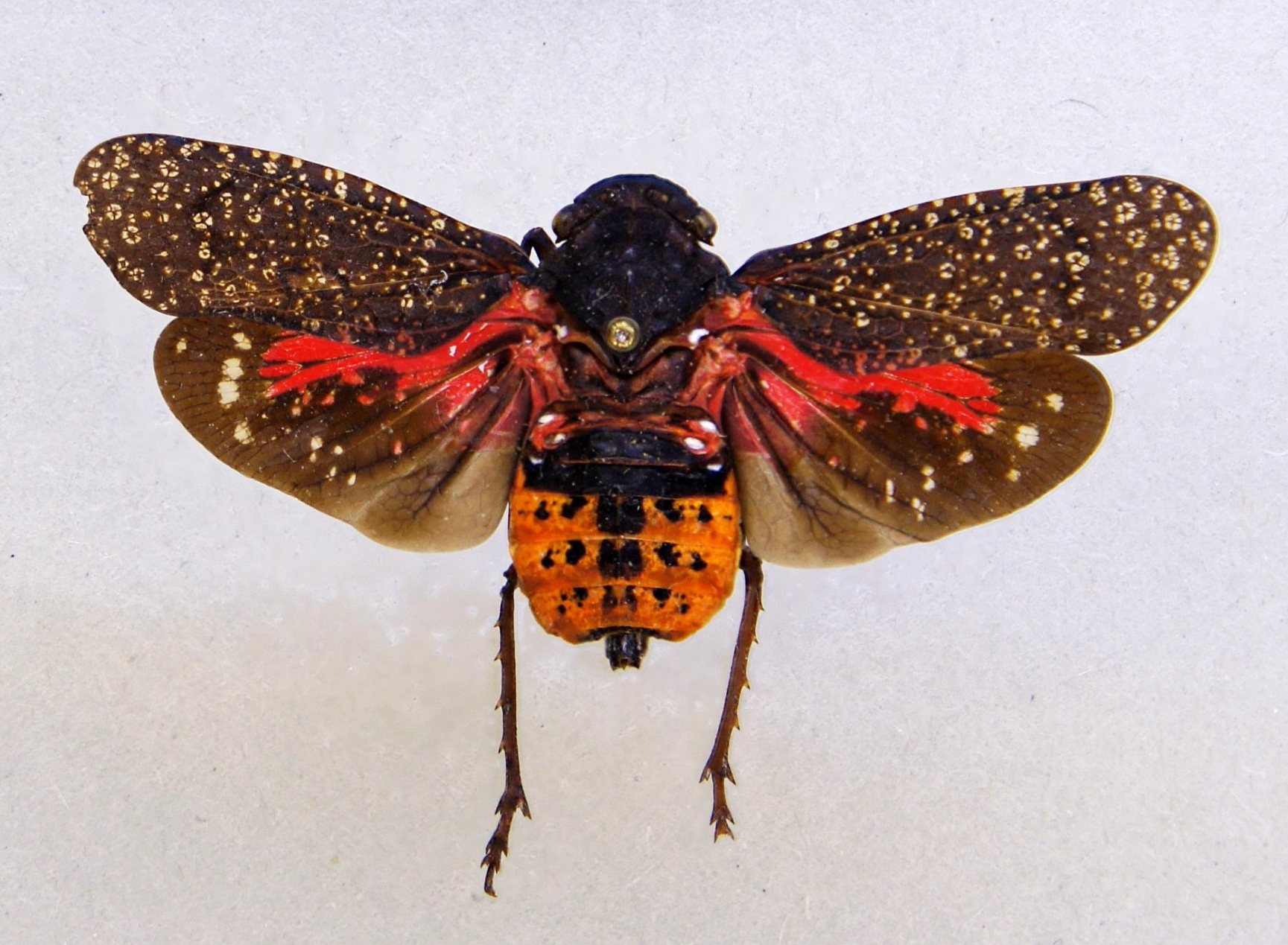
- Poiocera rugulosa

Scientific classification
- Domain: Eukaryota
- Kingdom: Animalia
- Phylum: Arthropoda
- Class: Insecta
- Order: Hemiptera
- Suborder: Auchenorrhyncha
- Infraorder: Fulgoromorpha
- Family: Fulgoridae
- Subfamily: Poiocerinae
- Tribe: Poiocerini
- Genus: Poiocera; De Laporte, 1832

Synonyms
- Poeocera Burmeister, 1835

= Poiocera =

Genus of planthoppers

Poiocera is a genus of planthoppers in the family Fulgoridae (subfamily Poiocerinae) occurring in South America.

== Species ==
- Poiocera conspersa (Germar, 1830) - type species
- Poiocera flaviventris (Germar, 1830)
- Poiocera rugulosa Walker, 1858
- Poiocera sperabilis Walker, 1858
