= Tecmar pausanias =

Scientific classification
- Kingdom: Animalia
- Phylum: Arthropoda
- Class: Insecta
- Order: Hemiptera
- Suborder: Auchenorrhyncha
- Infraorder: Fulgoromorpha
- Family: Fulgoridae
- Subfamily: Strongylodematinae
- Tribe: Strongylodematini
- Genus: Tecmar; Fennah, 1962
- Species: T. pausanias

Binomial name
- Tecmar pausanias Fennah, 1962

Species of planthopper

Tecmar is a monotypic genus of planthopper in the family Fulgoridae, presently comprising a single species Tecmar pausanias, known from South Africa.
