= Galela (planthopper) =

Scientific classification
- Domain: Eukaryota
- Kingdom: Animalia
- Phylum: Arthropoda
- Class: Insecta
- Order: Hemiptera
- Suborder: Auchenorrhyncha
- Infraorder: Fulgoromorpha
- Family: Fulgoridae
- Subfamily: Poiocerinae
- Tribe: Poiocerini
- Subtribe: Calyptoproctina
- Genus: Galela; Distant, 1906

Species
- Galela abdominalis; Galela pallescens; Galela parva

Genus of planthoppers

Galela is a genus of planthoppers in the family Fulgoridae from Indonesia and Western Australia.
