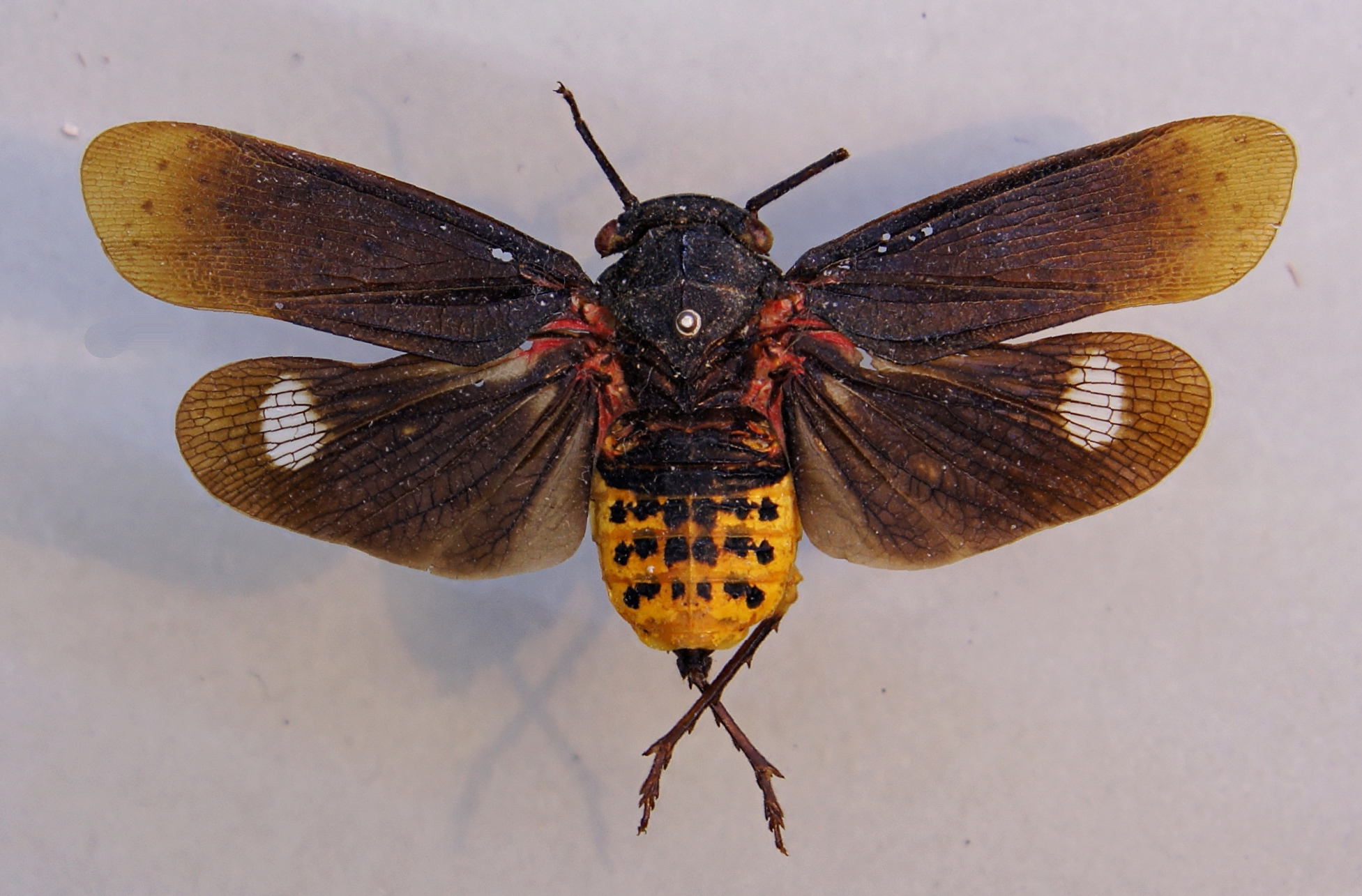
- Acraephia perspicillata

Scientific classification
- Domain: Eukaryota
- Kingdom: Animalia
- Phylum: Arthropoda
- Class: Insecta
- Order: Hemiptera
- Suborder: Auchenorrhyncha
- Infraorder: Fulgoromorpha
- Family: Fulgoridae
- Subtribe: Poiocerina
- Genus: Acraephia; Stål, 1866

Species
- See text

= Acraephia =

Genus of planthoppers

Acraephia is a genus of planthoppers in the family Fulgoridae.

== Species ==
- Acraephia fasciata
- Acraephia flavescens
- Acraephia multifaria
- Acraephia oculata
- Acraephia opaca
- Acraephia pallida
- Acraephia perspicillata
- Acraephia rubriceps
- Acraephia specularis
- Acraephia stoica
