= Codon (planthopper) =

Scientific classification
- Kingdom: Animalia
- Phylum: Arthropoda
- Class: Insecta
- Order: Hemiptera
- Suborder: Auchenorrhyncha
- Infraorder: Fulgoromorpha
- Family: Fulgoridae
- Subfamily: Strongylodematinae
- Genus: Codon; Fennah, 1962

Species
- See text

Genus of planthoppers

Codon is a genus of planthoppers in the family Fulgoridae, subfamily Stronglyodematinae. Species occur in South Africa.

== Species ==
- Codon adrastus Fennah, 1967
- Codon praestana Fennah, 1962
