= Brasiliana fusca =

Scientific classification
- Domain: Eukaryota
- Kingdom: Animalia
- Phylum: Arthropoda
- Class: Insecta
- Order: Hemiptera
- Suborder: Auchenorrhyncha
- Infraorder: Fulgoromorpha
- Family: Fulgoridae
- Genus: Brasiliana; Lallemand, 1959
- Species: B. fusca

Binomial name
- Brasiliana fusca Lallemand, 1959

Species of planthopper

Brasiliana is a monotypic genus of planthopper in the family Fulgoridae, presently comprising a single species Brasiliana fusca, known from Brazil.

== Identification ==
The body is mottled green with a peach face. The shape of the head can distinguish it from its close relatives.
