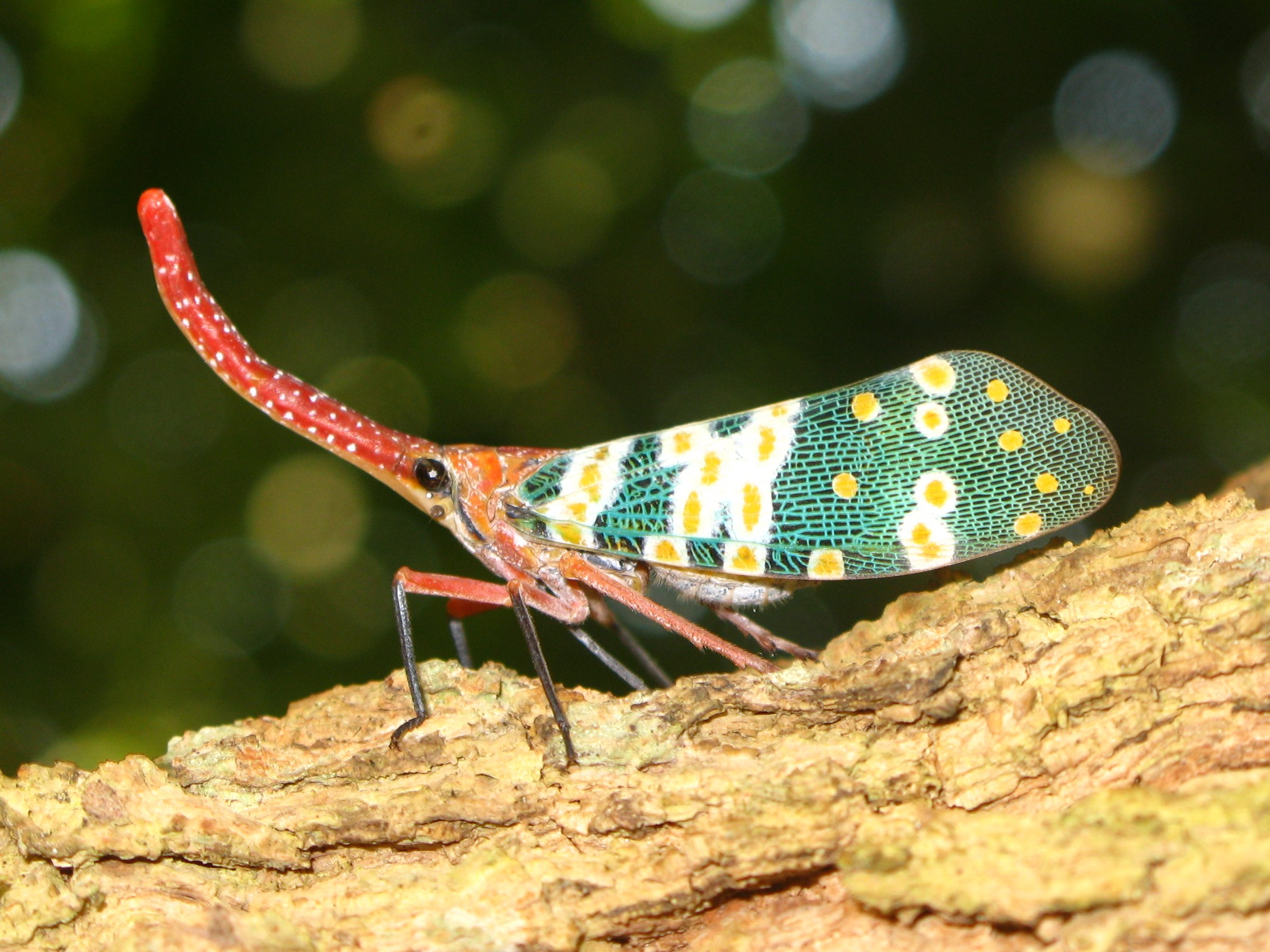
- Pyrops candelaria

Scientific classification
- Kingdom: Animalia
- Phylum: Arthropoda
- Class: Insecta
- Order: Hemiptera
- Suborder: Auchenorrhyncha
- Infraorder: Fulgoromorpha
- Superfamily: Fulgoroidea
- Family: Fulgoridae; Latreille, 1807

Subfamilies
- See text

= Fulgoridae =

Family of true bugs

The family Fulgoridae is a large group of hemipteran insects, especially abundant and diverse in the tropics, containing over 125 genera worldwide. They are mostly of moderate to large size, many with a superficial resemblance to Lepidoptera due to their brilliant and varied coloration. Various genera and species (especially the genera Fulgora and Pyrops) are sometimes referred to as lanternflies or lanthorn flies.

The head of some species is produced into a hollow process, resembling a snout, which is sometimes inflated and nearly as large as the body of the insect, sometimes elongated, narrow and apically upturned. It was believed, mainly on the authority of Maria Sibylla Merian, that this process, the so-called lantern, was luminous at night in the living insect. Carl Linnaeus adopted the statement without question and coined a number of specific names, such as laternaria, phosphorea and candelaria to illustrate the supposed fact, and thus propagated the myth.

== Taxonomy ==
Metcalf in 1938, as amended in 1947, recognized five subfamilies (Amyclinae, Aphaeninae, Fulgorinae, Phenacinae, and Poiocerinae) and twelve tribes in the Fulgoridae. By 1963 Lallemand had divided the Fulgoridae into eight subfamilies (Amyclinae, Aphaeninae, Enchophorinae, Fulgorinae, Phenacinae, Poiocerinae, Xosopharinae and Zanninae) and eleven tribes. This classification was generally accepted.

However, 21st century molecular analysis has called into question the organization of Fulgoridae, and suggests that the subfamily Zanninae may not belong in Fulgoridae.

=== Subfamilies and selected genera ===
The NCBI and the Hemiptera Database currently include to the following sub-families and genera (lists complete if subfamily not linked):

- Amyclinae (Central America, Africa, Australia) - selected genera:
  - Alcathous Stål, 1863
  - Amycle Stål, 1861
- Aphaeninae
  - Aphaenini
    - Aphaena Guérin-Méneville, 1834 (India, China, Indo-China)
    - Kalidasa (Indo-China)
    - Lycorma (Indo-China)
    - Neolieftinckana Lallemand, 1963 (PNG)
    - Omalocephala Spinola, 1839
    - Penthicodes (Indo-China)
    - Scamandra Stål, 1863 (Malesia)
  - Pyropsini - SE Asia
    - Datua Schmidt, 1911
    - Hariola Stål, 1863
    - Pyrops Spinola, 1839 (tropical Asia)
    - Saiva Distant, 1906 (India, Indo-China, Malesia)
- Dichopterinae Melichar, 1912
  - Cladodiptera Spinola, 1839 (South America)
  - Dichoptera Spinola, 1839 (type genus - Asia)
  - Dorysarthrus Puton, 1895
  - Protachilus Fennah, 1944
- Enchophorinae Haupt, 1929 (S. America, Madagascar)
  - Artacie Stål, 1866
  - Belbina Stål, 1863
  - Chilobia Stål, 1863
  - Enchophora Spinola, 1839
  - Enhydria Walker, 1858
  - Villala Goemans & O'Brien, 2005
- Fulgorinae
  - Aphrodisias Kirkaldy, 1906 (Central America)
  - Cathedra Kirkaldy, 1903 (monotypic, S. America)
  - Fulgora Linné, 1767 (tropical Americas)
  - Odontoptera Carreno, 1841 (tropical Americas)
- Lyncidinae Schmidt, 1915 (southern Africa)
  - Lyncides Stål, 1866
  - Risius Stål, 1859
- Phenacinae (Central and South America)
  - Cerogenes Horváth, 1909
  - Menenia Stål, 1866
  - Phenax Germar, 1833
  - Pterodictya Burmeister, 1835
- Poiocerinae
  - Alphina Stål, 1863
  - Amantia Stål, 1864
  - Calyptoproctus Spinola, 1839 (Americas)
  - Cyrpoptus Stål, 1862
  - Lystra Fabricius, 1803 (central & southern America)
  - Poblicia Stål, 1866 (N. America)
  - Polydictya Guérin-Méneville, 1844 (South-East Asia: Indo-China, Malesia)
  - Poiocera De Laporte, 1832
  - Scaralina Yanega, 2024
  - Scaralis Stål, 1863
- Strongylodematinae Fennah, 1962 (southern Africa)
  - Capocles Emeljanov, 2004
  - Capenopsis Melichar, 1912
  - Codon Fennah, 1962
  - Strongylodemas Stål, 1853
  - Tecmar Fennah, 1962
- Xosopharinae Metcalf, 1947 (Africa, Australia)
  - Eningia Walker, 1858
  - Eurinopsyche Kirkaldy, 1906
  - Mantosyna Stål, 1869
  - Rentinus Metcalf, 1947
  - Xosophara Kirkaldy, 1904
- Zanninae Metcalf, 1938
  - Zanna Kirkaldy, 1902 (Africa, Asia)
- Fulgoridae incertae sedis
  - Amdewana Nast, 1951 (neotropical)
  - Amerzanna O'Brien, 1991
  - Flatolystra Nast, 1950 (south America)
  - Fulgoricesa Koçak & Kemal, 2010 (synonym: Weyrauchia)
  - Neocynthus Nast, 1950 (South America)
  - Sinuala O'Brien, 1991 (3 spp., Central America)
  - Stalubra O'Brien, 1991 (South America)

Notes:

- Laternaria is a suppressed senior synonym of Pyrops
- Pyrilla Stål, 1859 is now placed in the Lophopidae
- The type species of genus Apossoda, A. togoensis Schmidt, 1911 is now placed as Pyrgoteles togoensis (Schmidt, 1911)

== Gallery ==
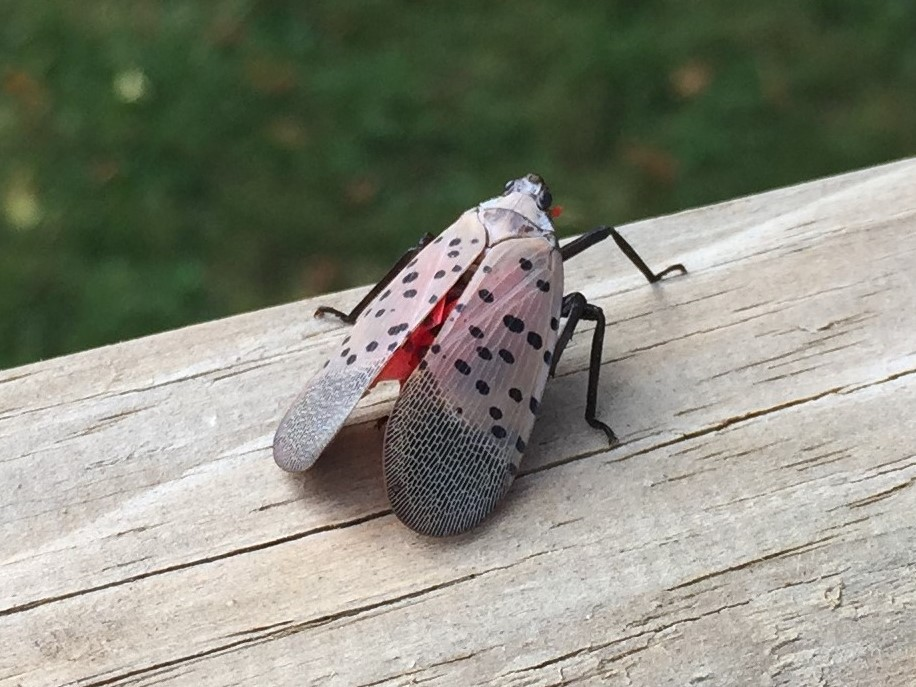
Aphaeninae: Lycorma delicatula (Spotted lanternfly)

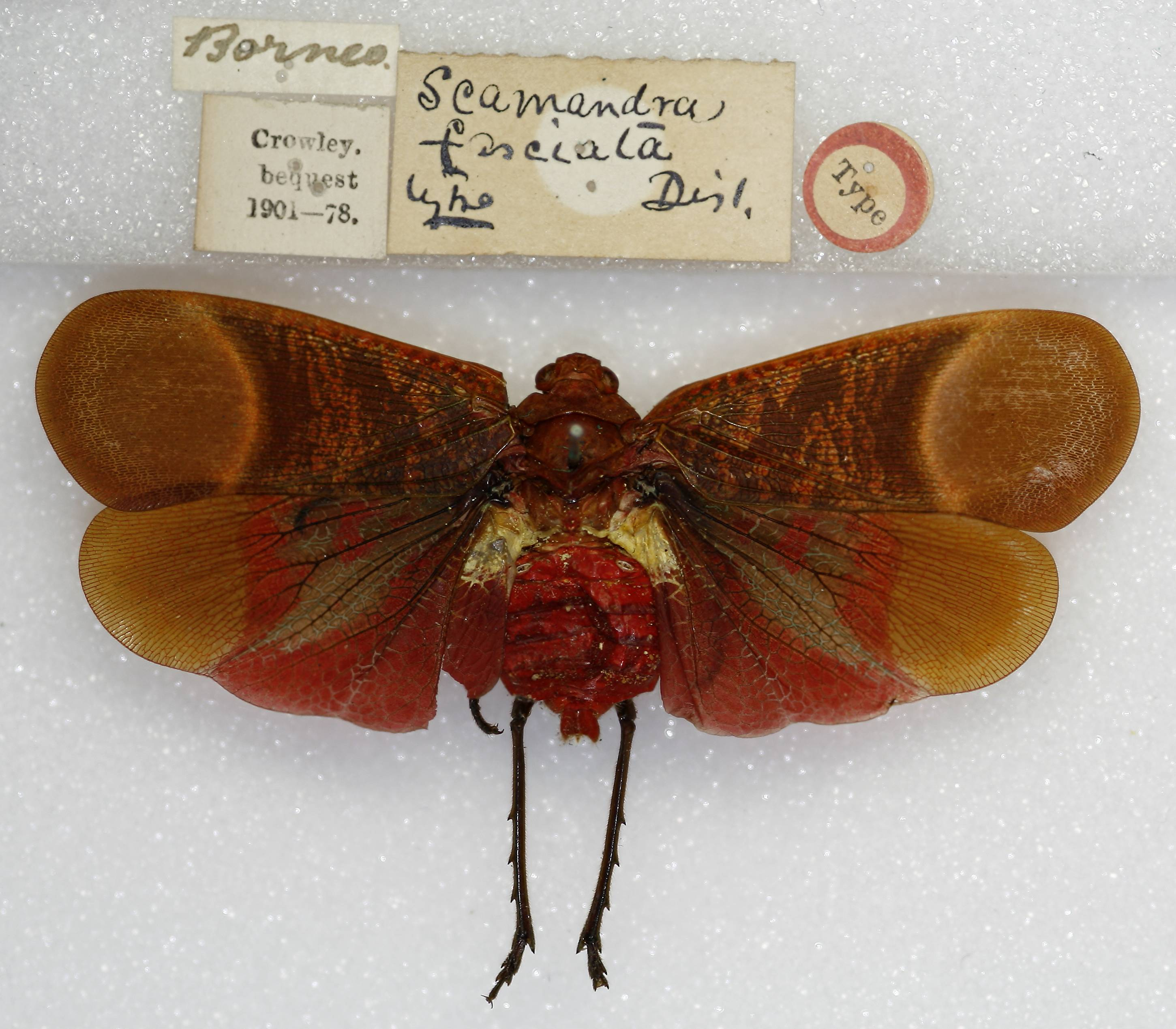
Aphaeninae: Scamandra fasciata (Holotype). Currently regarded as a synonym of Scamandra rosea

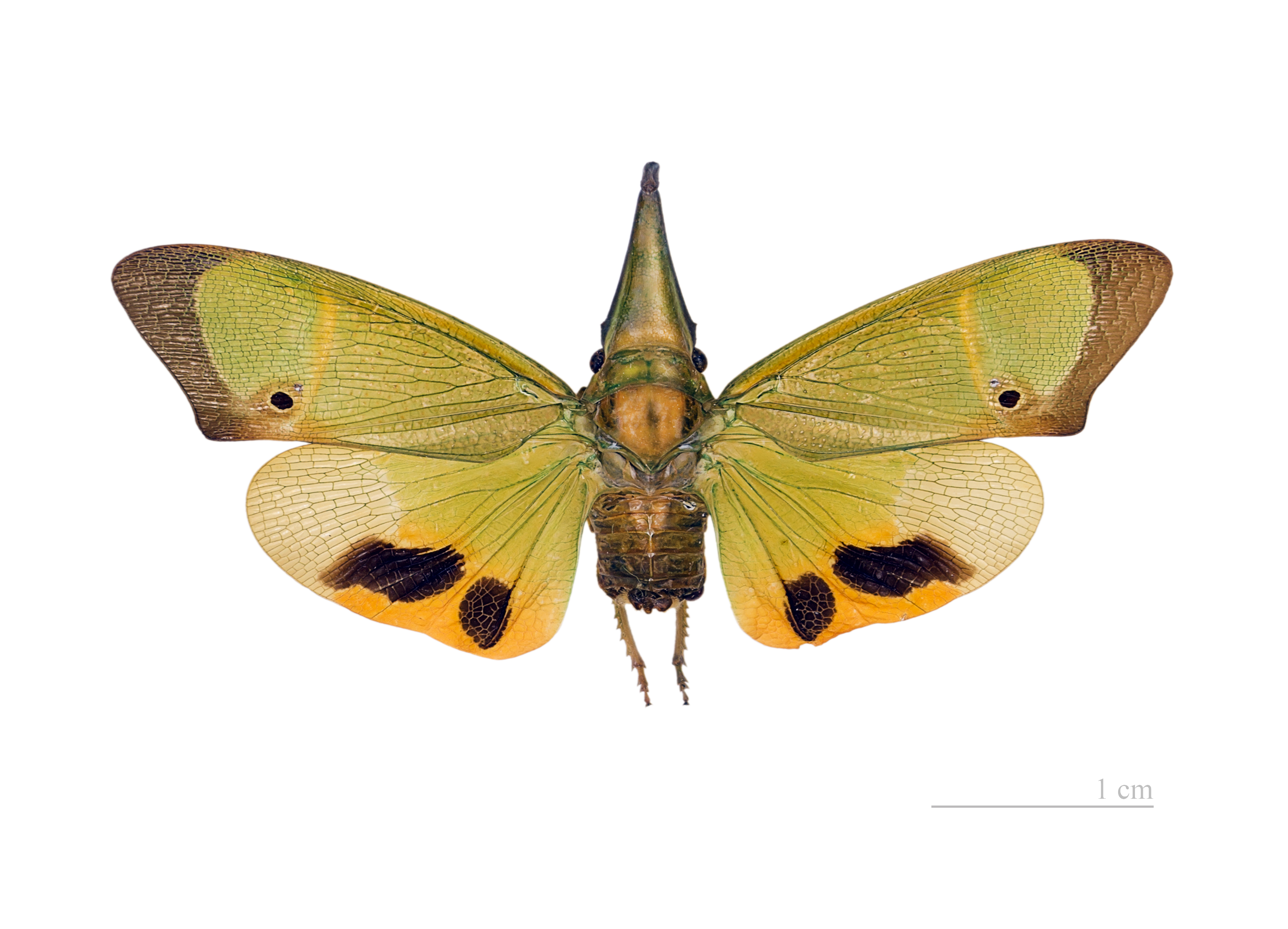
Fulgorinae: Odontoptera carrenoi

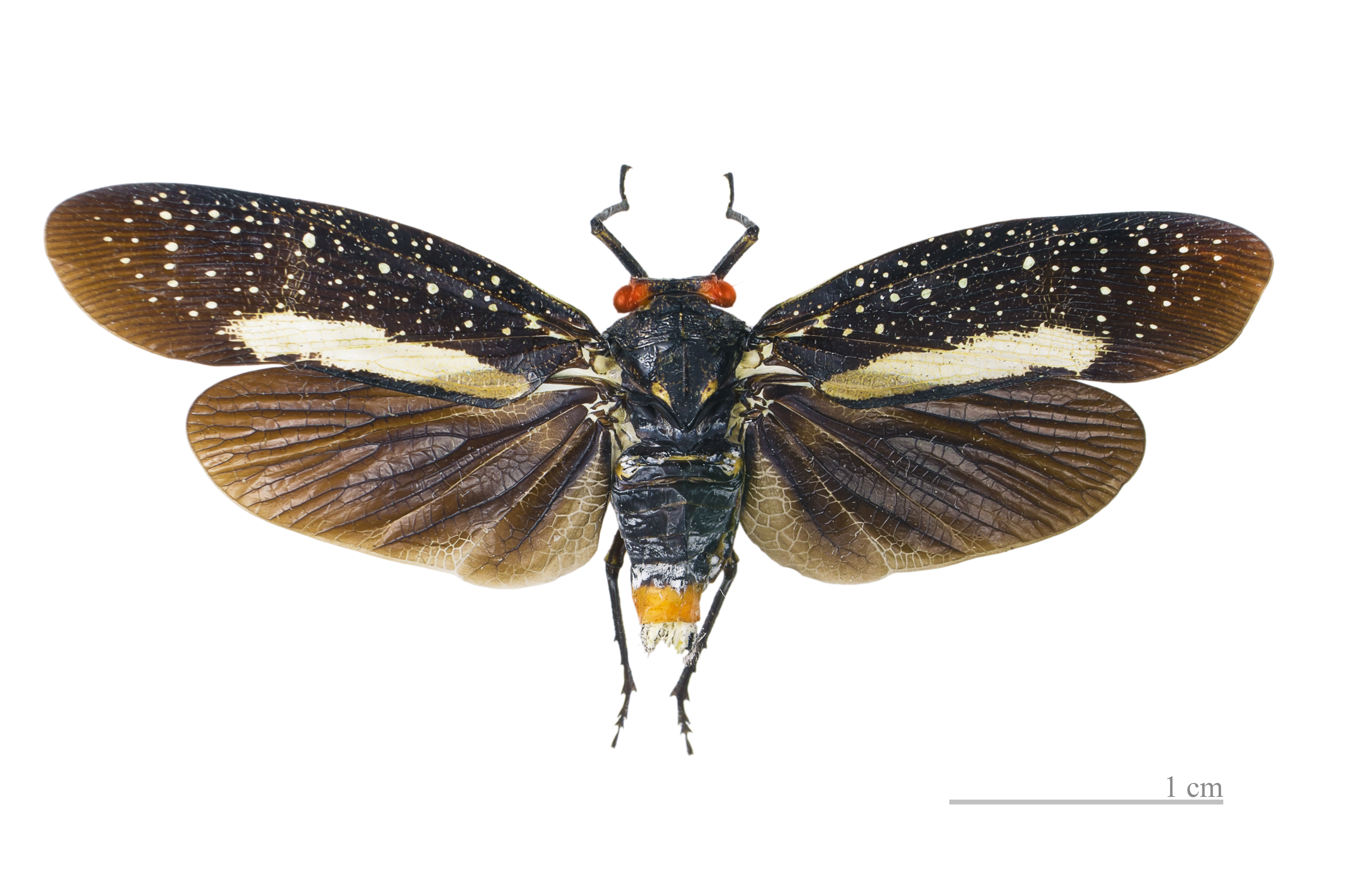
Poiocerinae: Lystra lanata

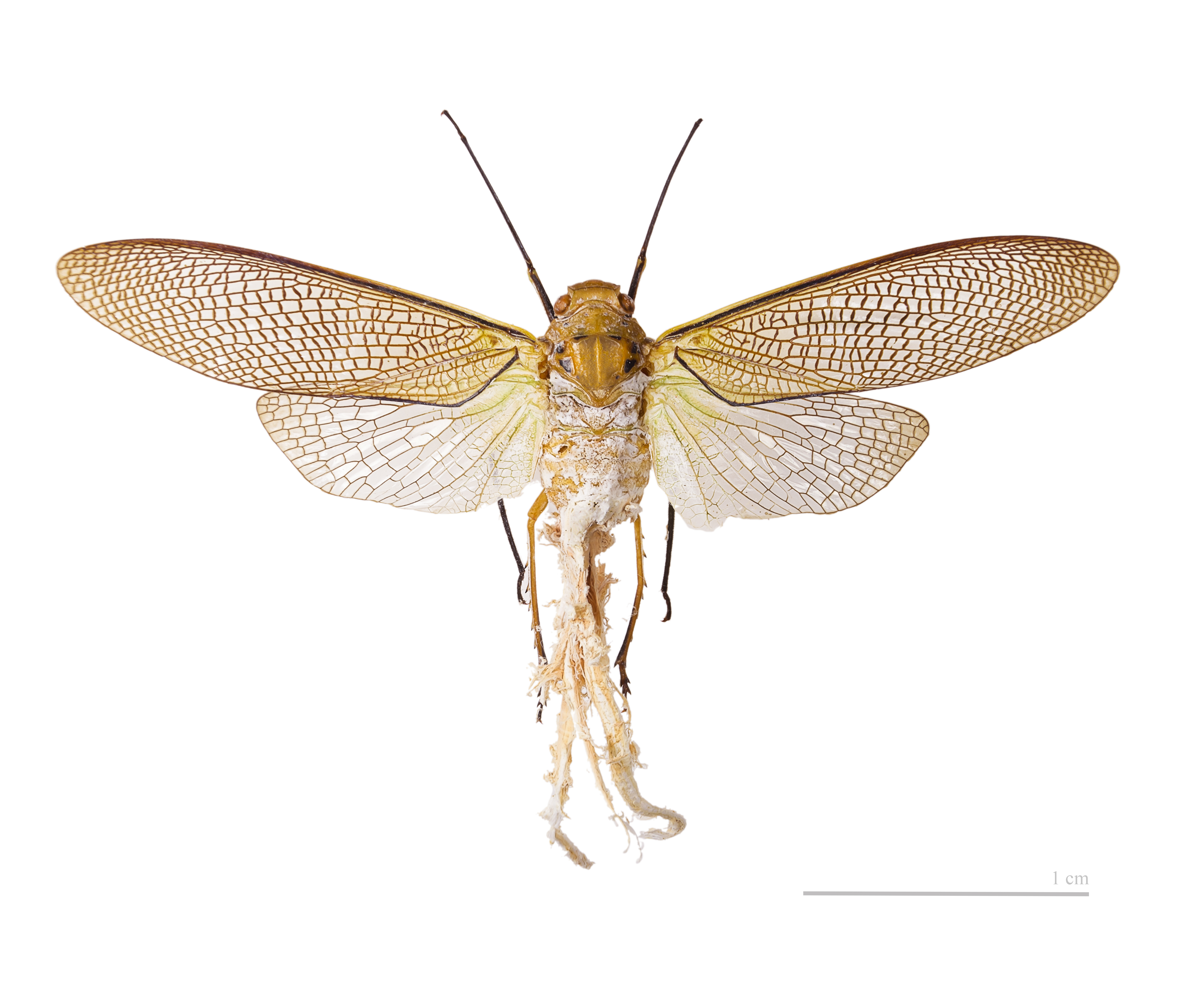
Phenacinae: Pterodictya reticularis

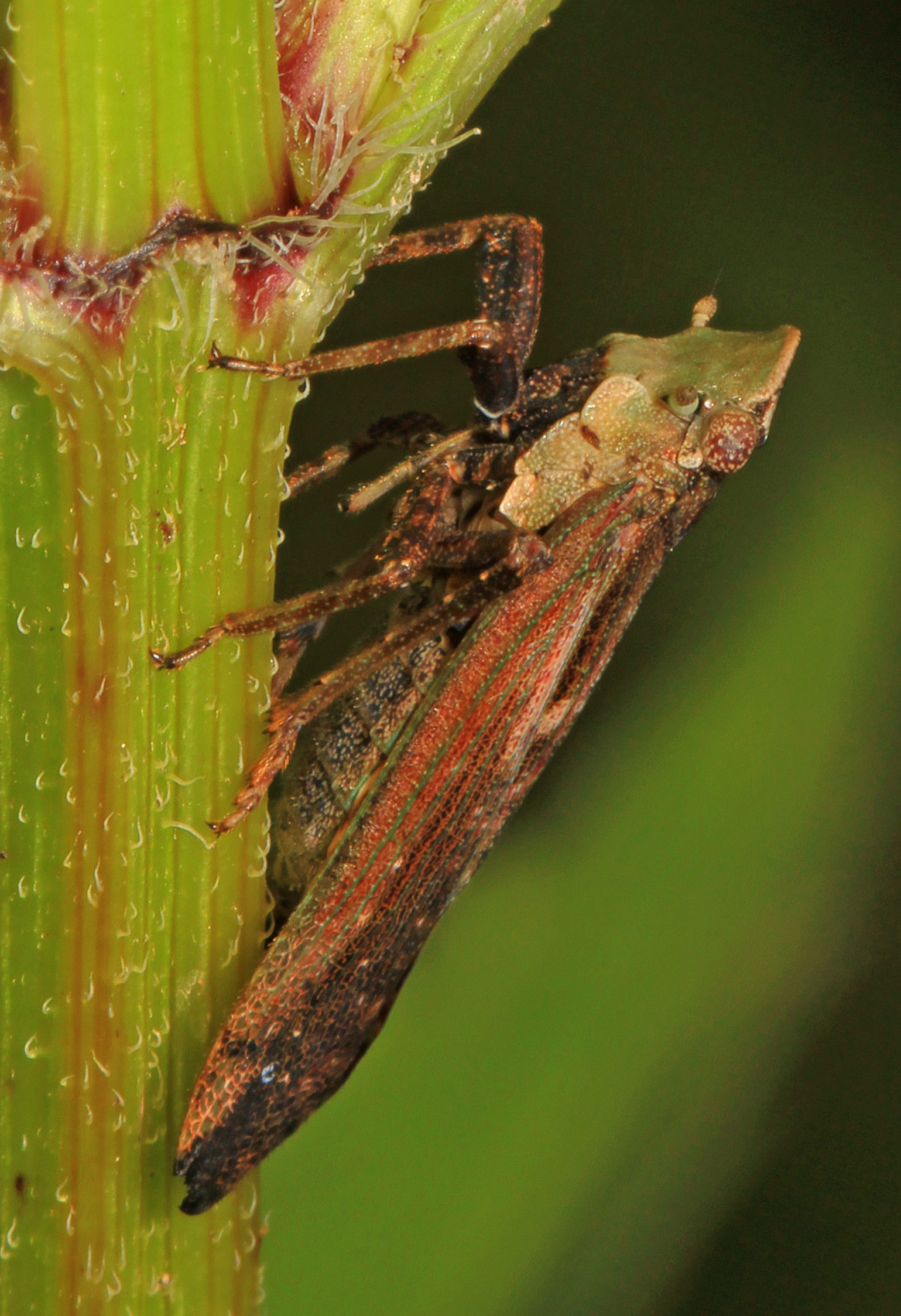
Poiocerinae: Cyrpoptus sp. (North America)

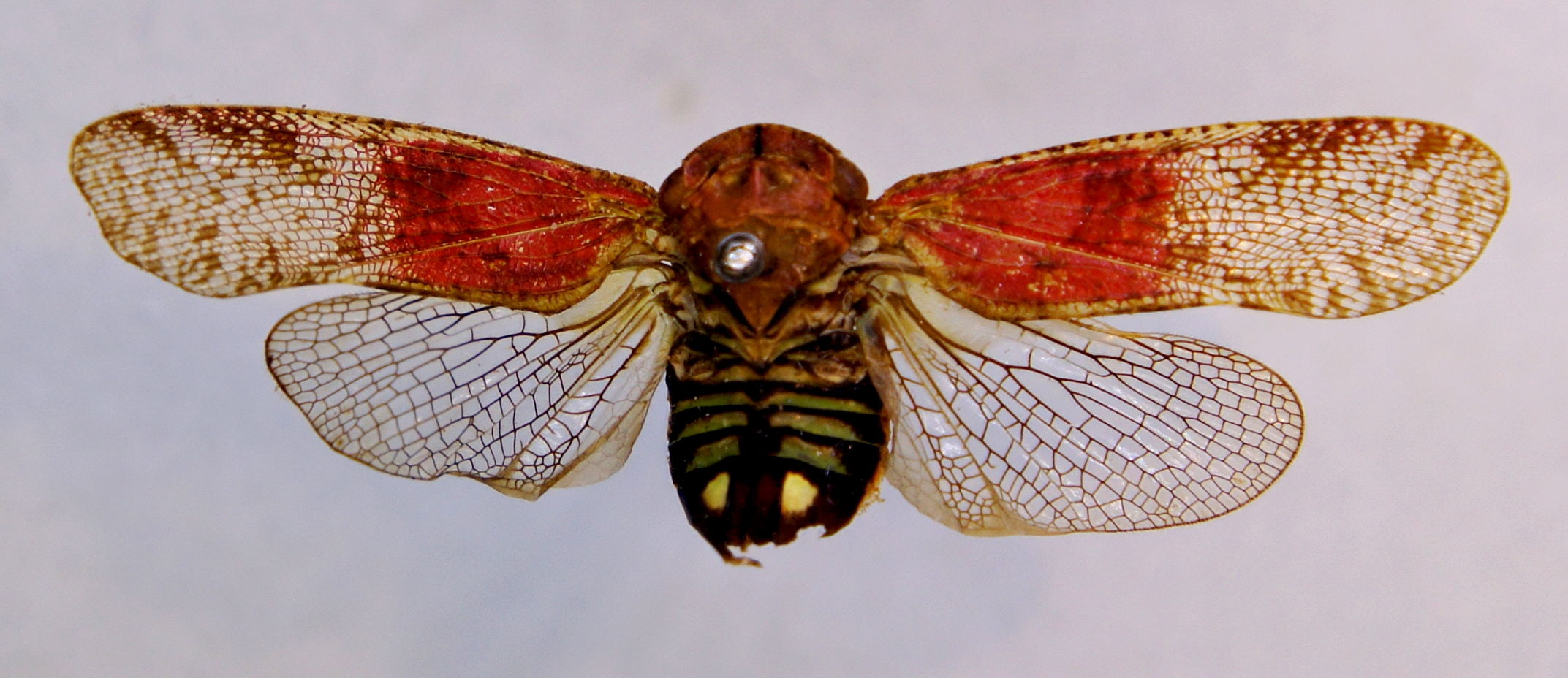
Calyptoproctus sp.

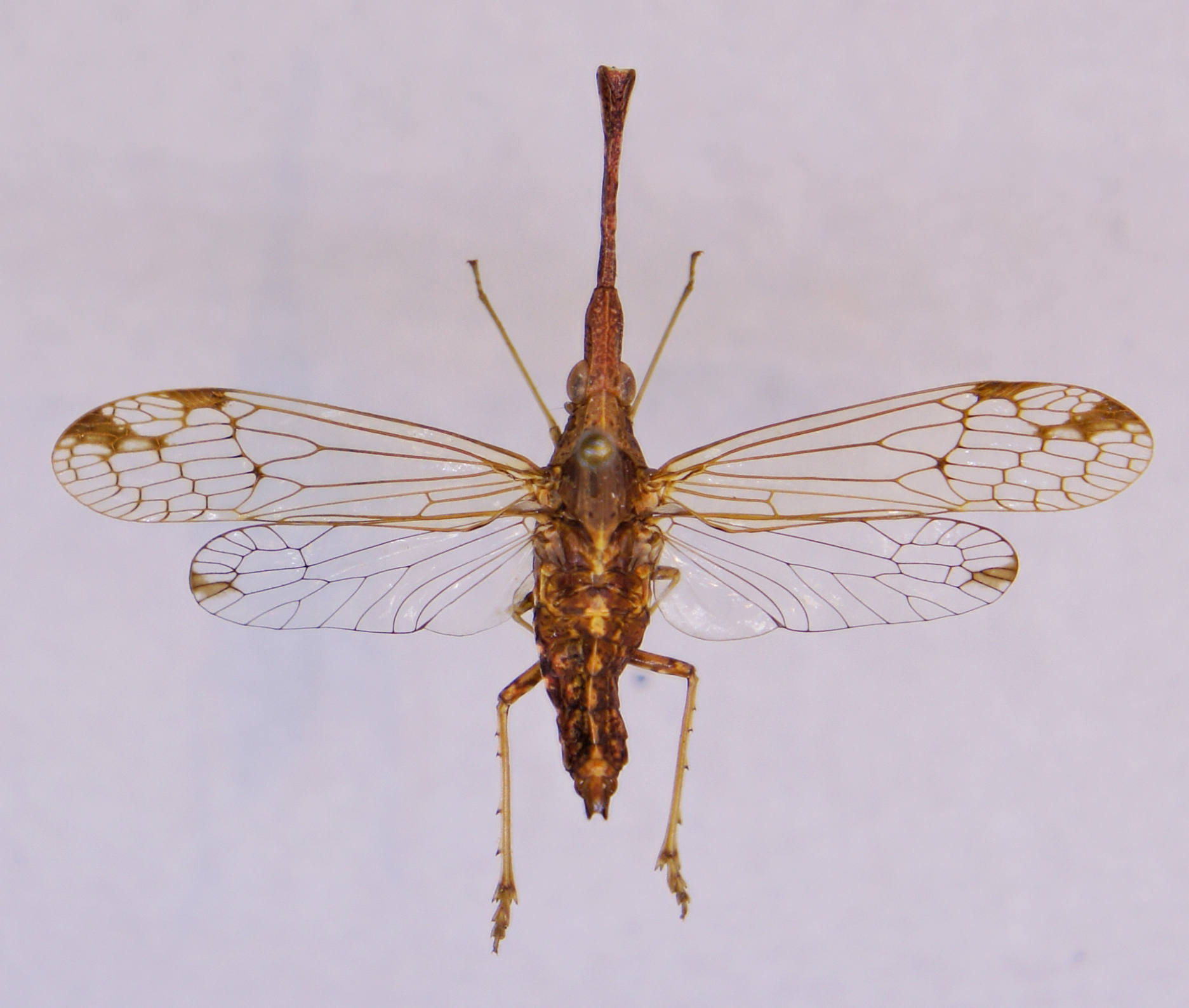
Pibrocha egregia

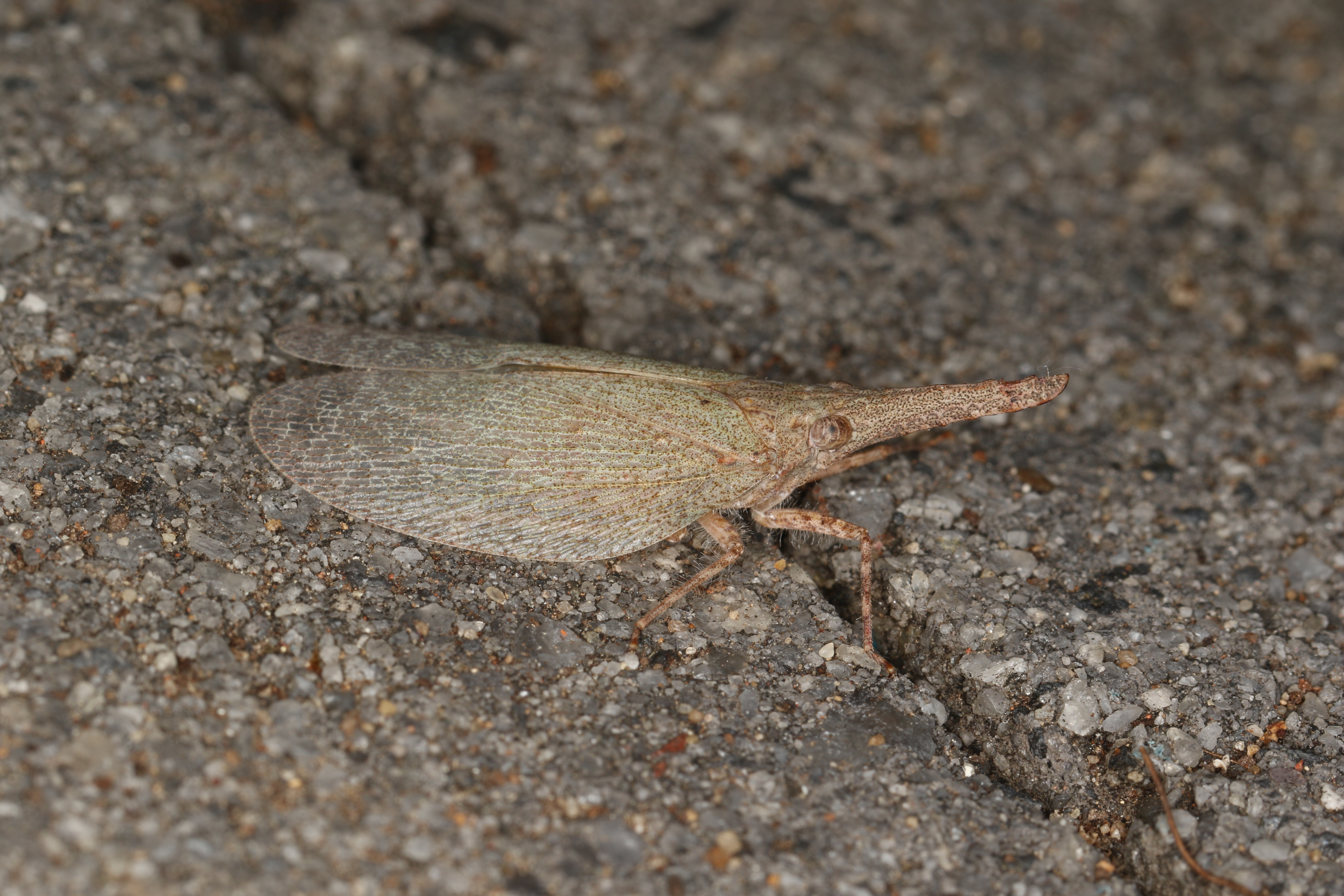
Xosopharinae: Rentinus dilatatus

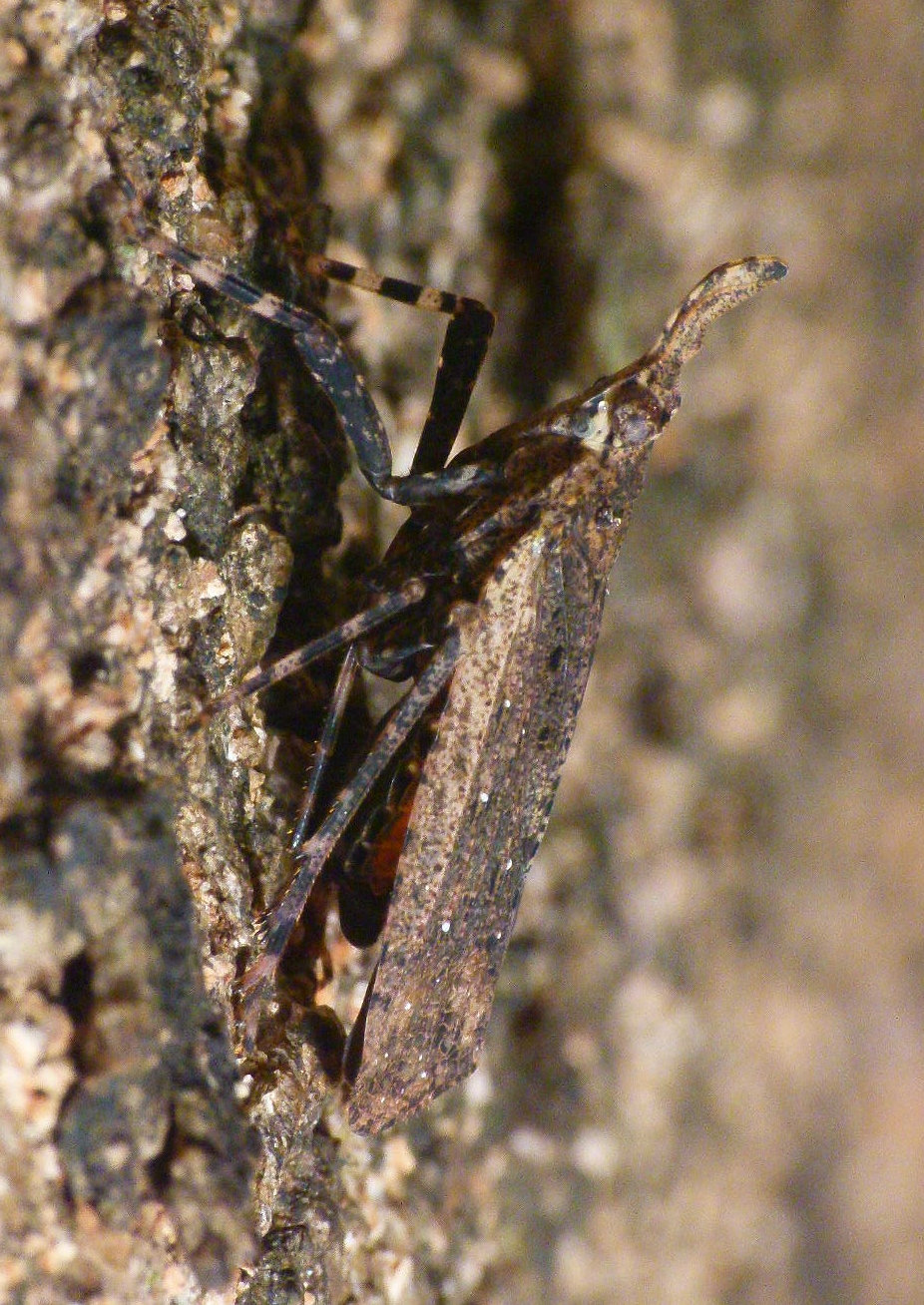
Alcathous fecialis (India)

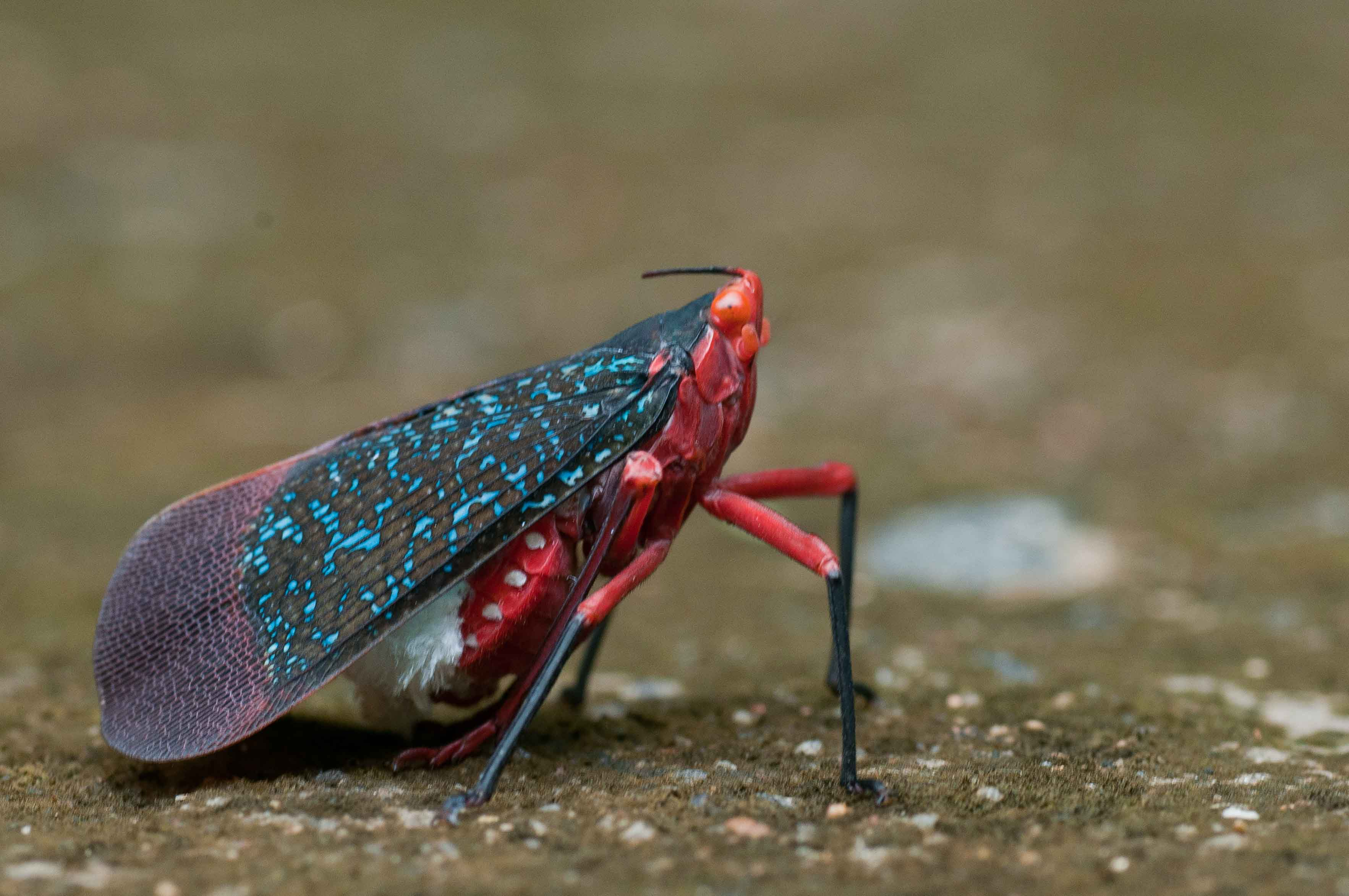
Kalidasa sp.

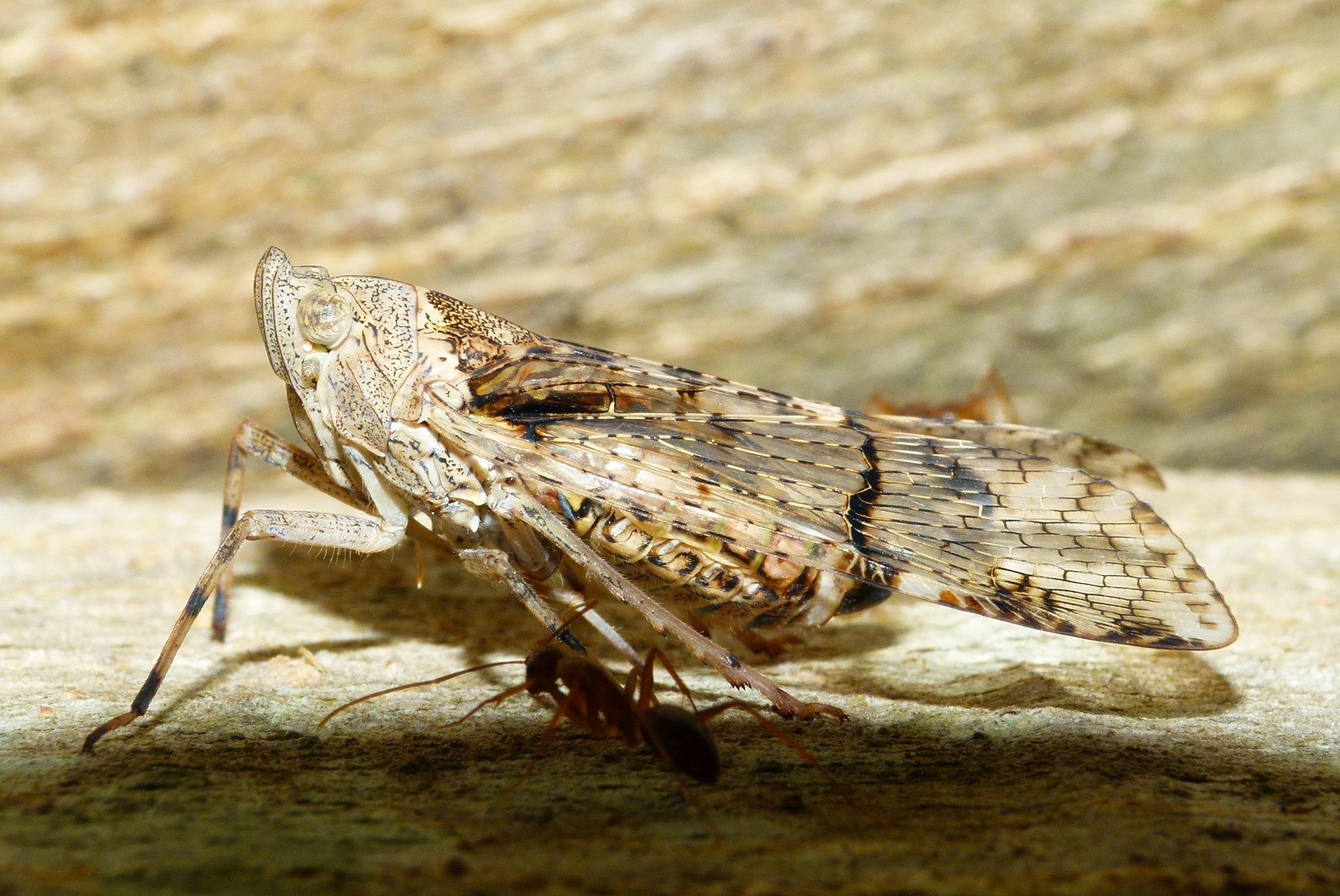
Dichoptera hyalinata (India)

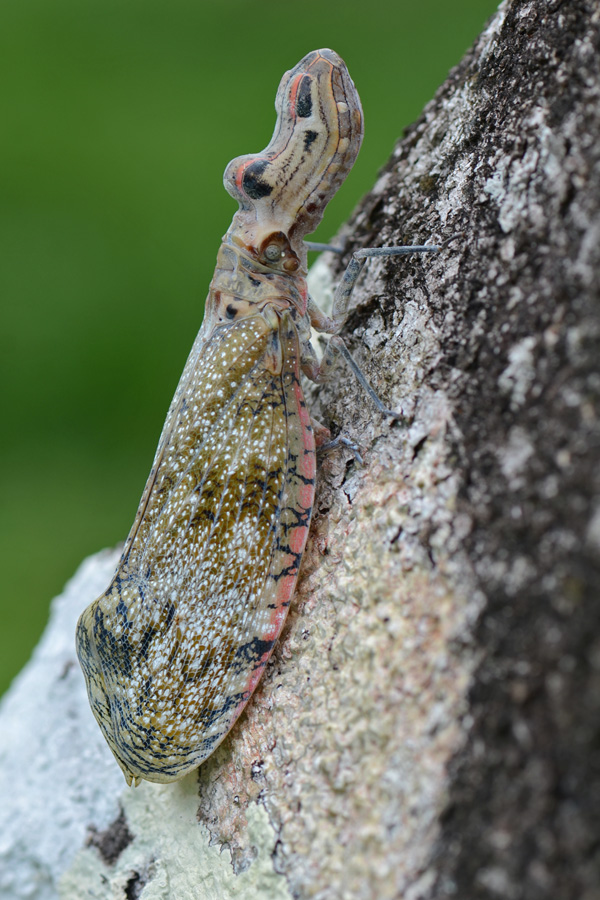
Fulgora sp.

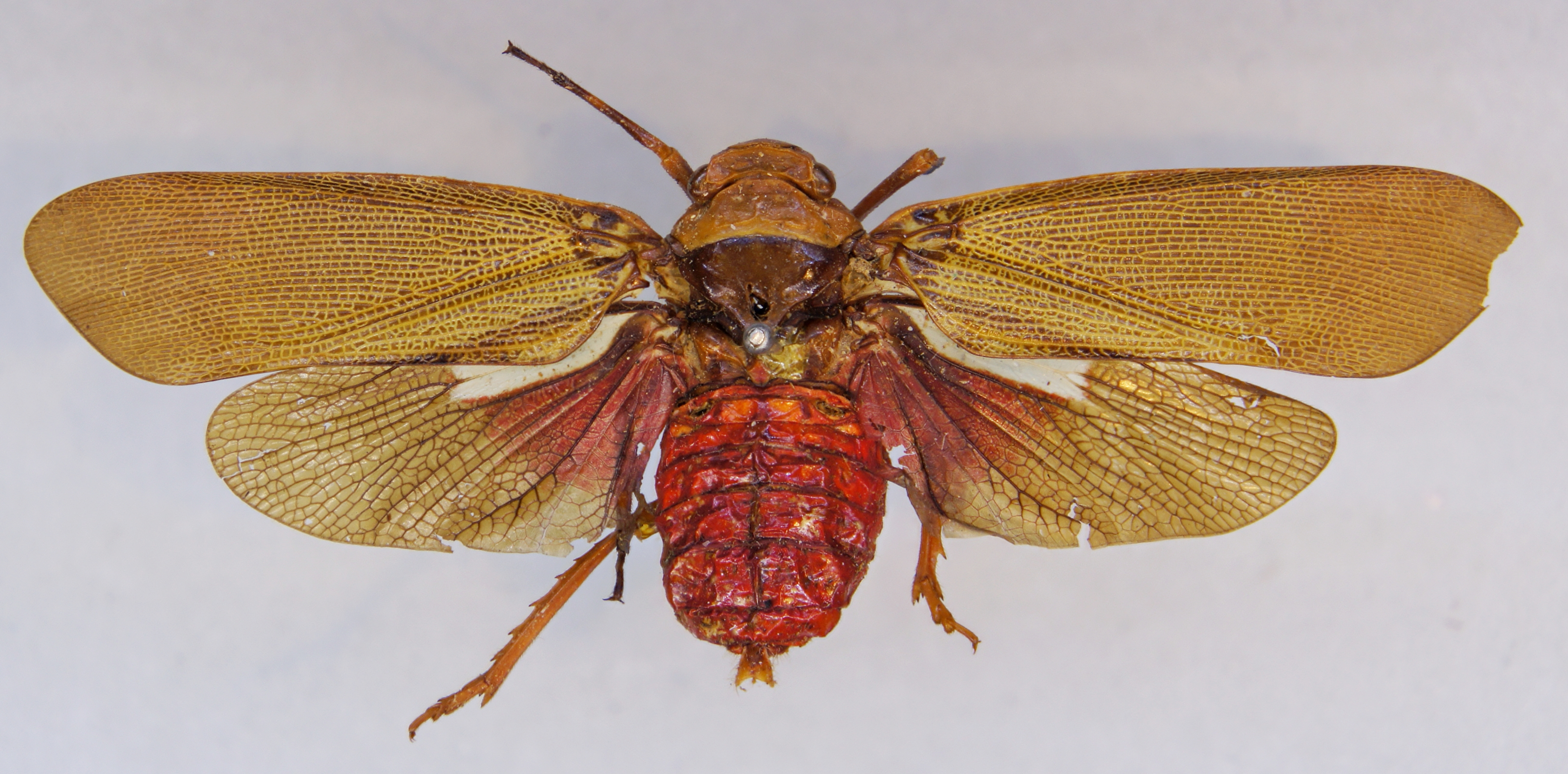
Polydictya basalis

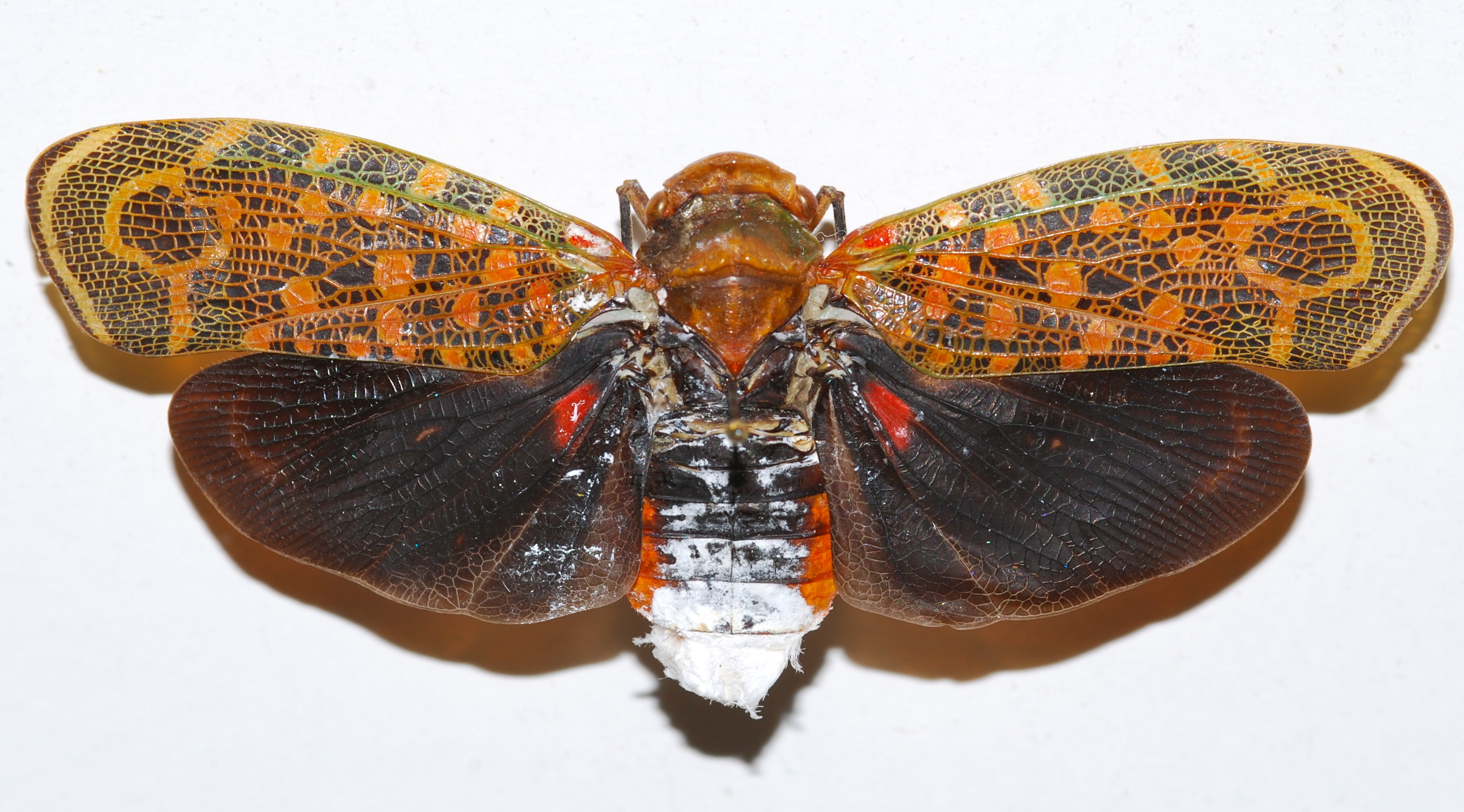
Auchalea pandora (Peru)

== Sources ==
- T. Porion (1994). Fulgoridae 1. Illustrated Catalogue of the American Fauna, Sciences Nat, Venette, 72 pages, 14 plates in colours
- T. Porion & S. Nagai (1996). Fulgoridae 2. Illustrated Catalogue of the Asian and Australian Fauna, Sciences Nat, Venette, 80 pp., 20 plates in colours (Suppl. 1, Suppl. 2)
- T. Porion & P. Bleuzen (2004). Fulgoridae 1. Supplement 1. New Neotropical Fulgoridae, Hillside Books, Canterbury, 22 pages, 4 plates in colours
