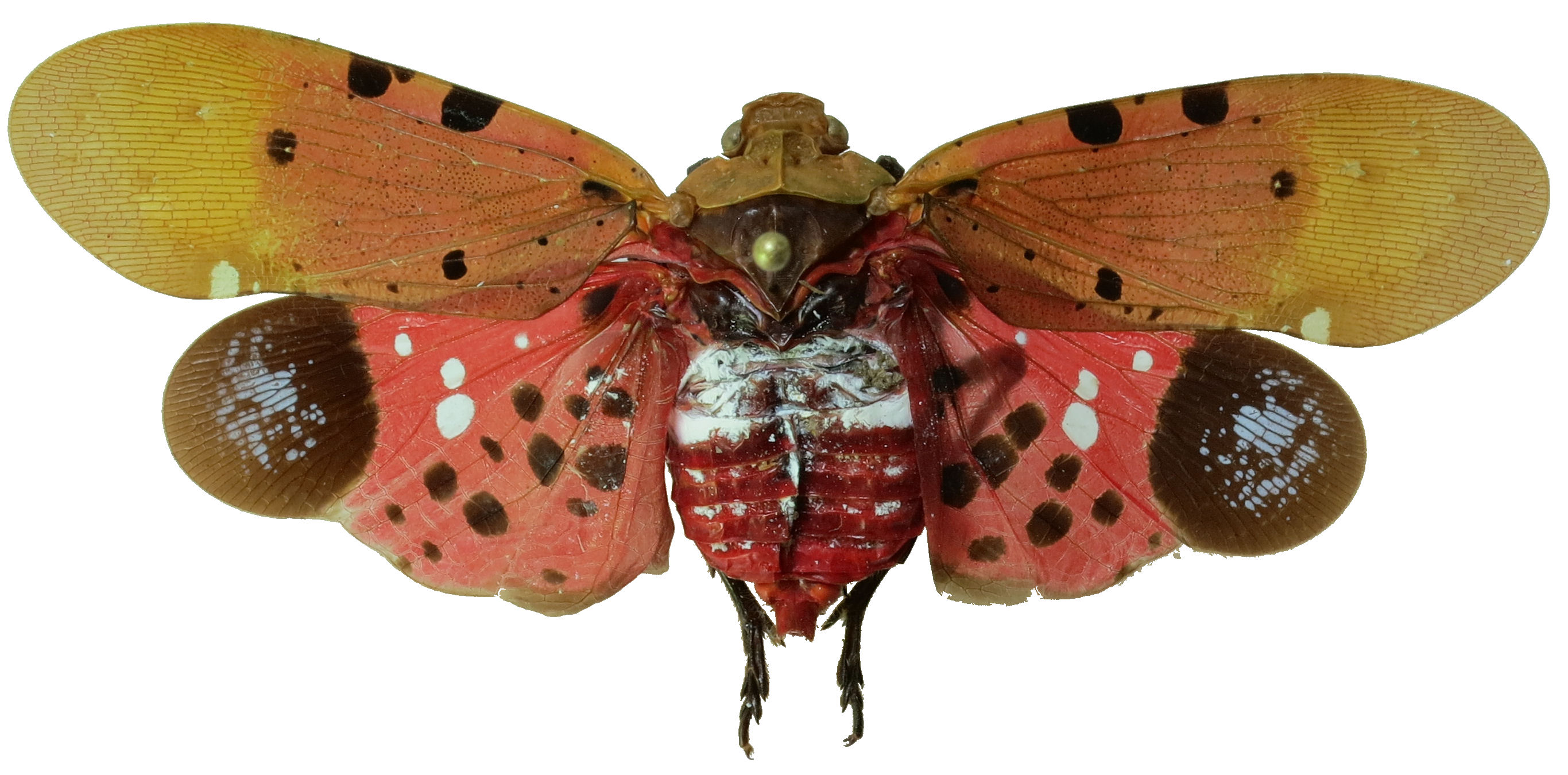
- Penthicodes atomaria from Thailand

Scientific classification
- Kingdom: Animalia
- Phylum: Arthropoda
- Class: Insecta
- Order: Hemiptera
- Suborder: Auchenorrhyncha
- Infraorder: Fulgoromorpha
- Family: Fulgoridae
- Subfamily: Aphaeninae
- Tribe: Aphaenini
- Genus: Penthicodes
- Species: P. atomaria

Binomial name
- Penthicodes atomaria (Weber, 1801)

Synonyms
- Aphaena atomaria (Weber, 1801); Aphaena nigropunctata Guérin-Méneville, 1838; Aphana atomaria (Weber, 1801); Aphana atomaria Atkinson, 1885; Aphana nigropunctata Guérin-Méneville, 1838; Cicada atomaria Weber, 1801; Lystra atomaria (Weber, 1801); Penthicodes atkinsoni Schmidt, 1923; Penthicodes atomaria (Weber, 1801); Penthicodes picta Blanchard, 1849; Penthicus atomarius (Weber, 1801)

= Penthicodes atomaria =

Species of true bug

Penthicodes atomaria is a species of lanternfly belonging to the family Fulgoridae.

== Description ==
Penthicodes atomaria can reach a length of about 55 millimetres (2.2 in), with a wingspan of about 50 millimetres (2.0 in). The pronotum is yellow, the head and the scutellum are brown, while the abdomen is reddish with a few small white spots. The upper side of the forewings is whitish at the base and brown at the marginal, with four black spots. The upper side of the hindwings is red, with many black spots and two large black marking at the apex.

== Distribution ==
This species can be found in Indonesia, Thailand, Laos and Vietnam.
