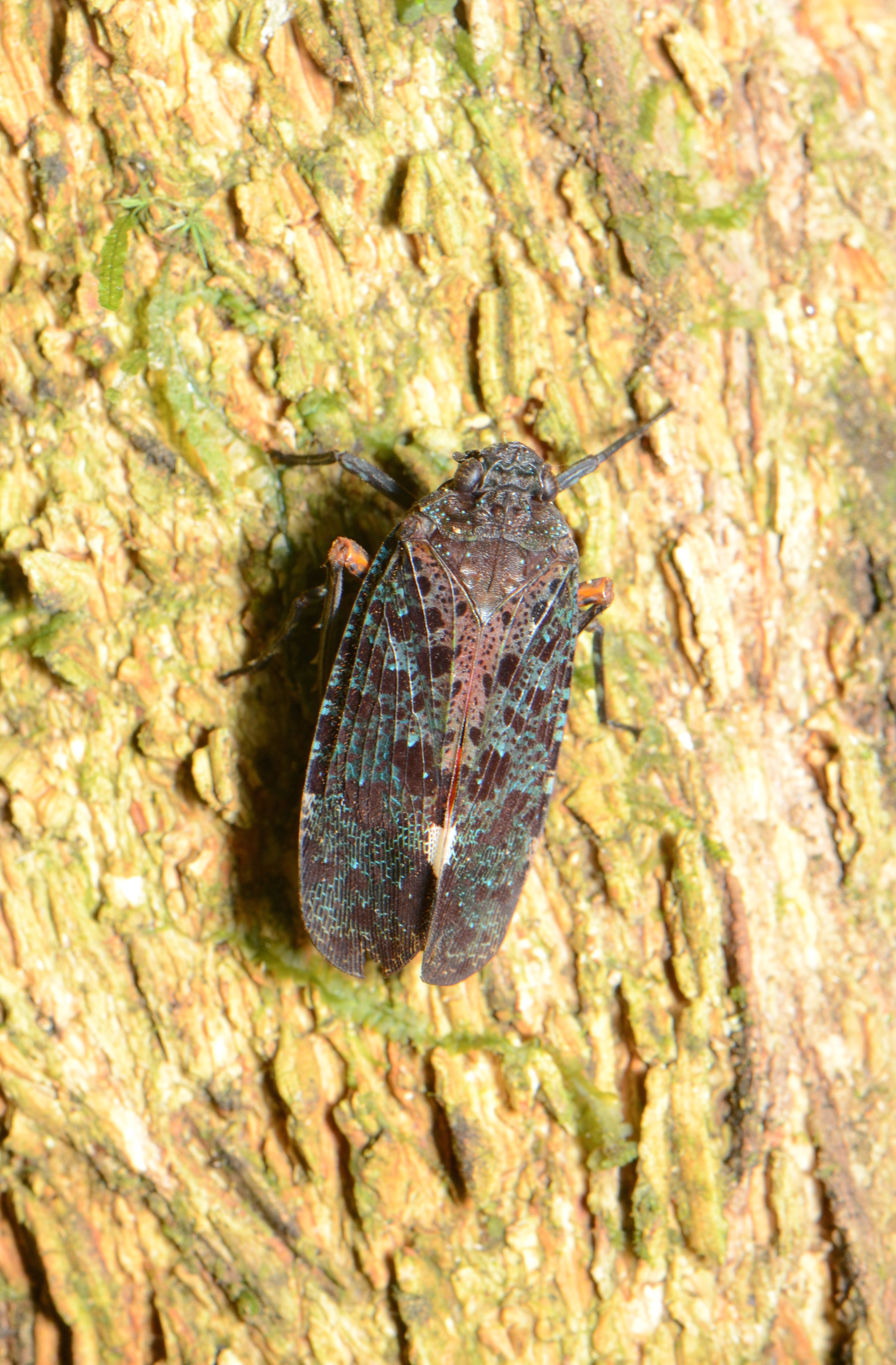

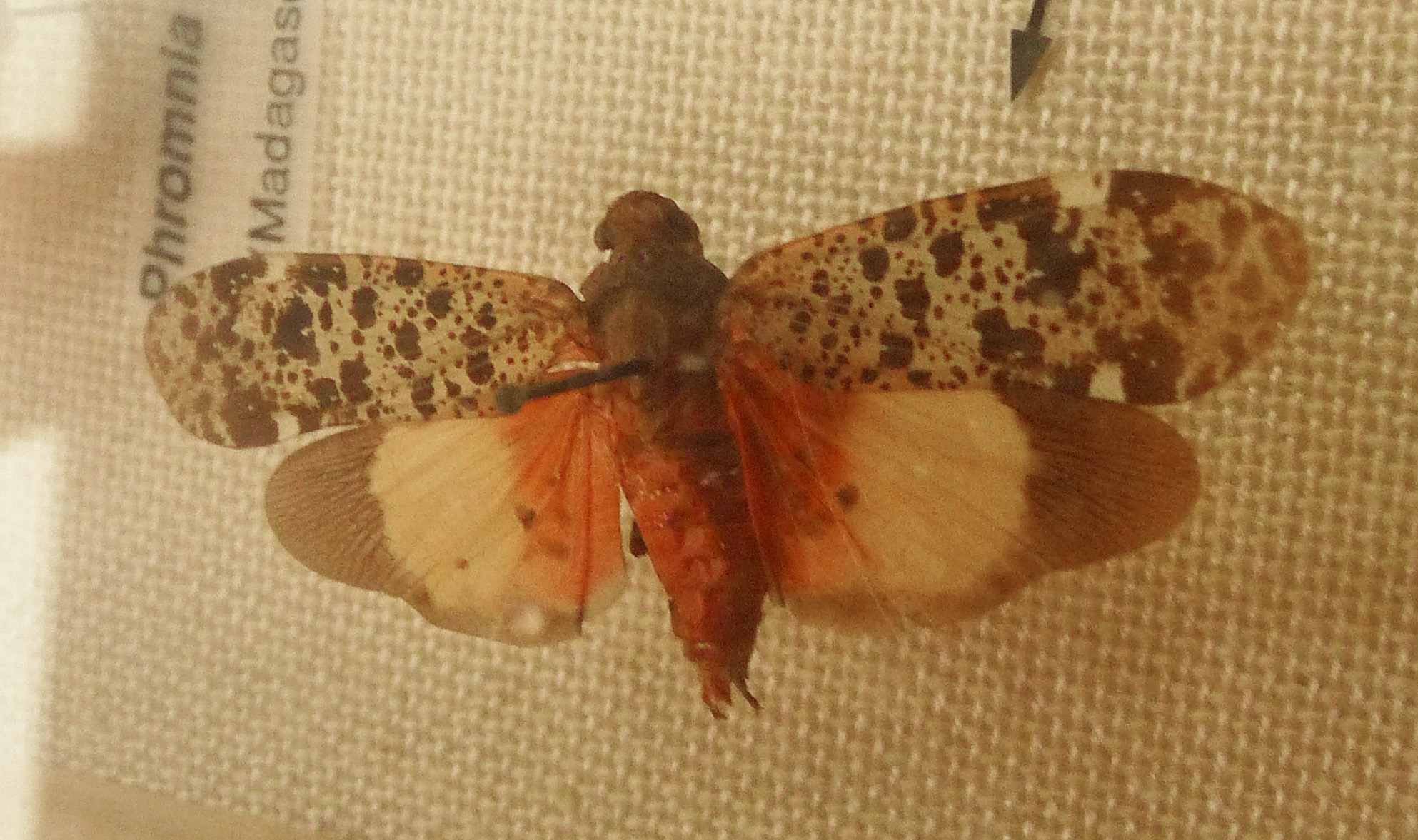

Scientific classification
- Kingdom: Animalia
- Phylum: Arthropoda
- Class: Insecta
- Order: Hemiptera
- Suborder: Auchenorrhyncha
- Infraorder: Fulgoromorpha
- Family: Fulgoridae
- Subfamily: Aphaeninae
- Tribe: Aphaenini
- Genus: Penthicodes
- Species: P. variegatus

Binomial name
- Penthicodes variegatus (Guérin-Méneville, 1829)

Synonyms
- Aphaena variegata Guérin-Méneville, 1829

= Penthicodes variegatus =

Species of planthopper

Penthicodes variegatus is a species of planthoppers in the subfamily Aphaeninae (Fulgoridae), found in South-East Asia. It belongs to the subgenus Ereosoma Kirkaldy, 1906. The genus name was formerly treated as feminine, but in 2022 it was revised to masculine following ICZN Article 30.1.4.4, (Note: ICZN Code 30.1.4.4. A compound genus-group name ending in the suffix -ites, -oides, -ides, -odes, or -istes is to be treated as masculine unless its author, when establishing the name, stated that it had another gender or treated it as such by combining it with an adjectival species-group name in another gender form.) changing the spelling of this species' name from variegata to variegatus.
