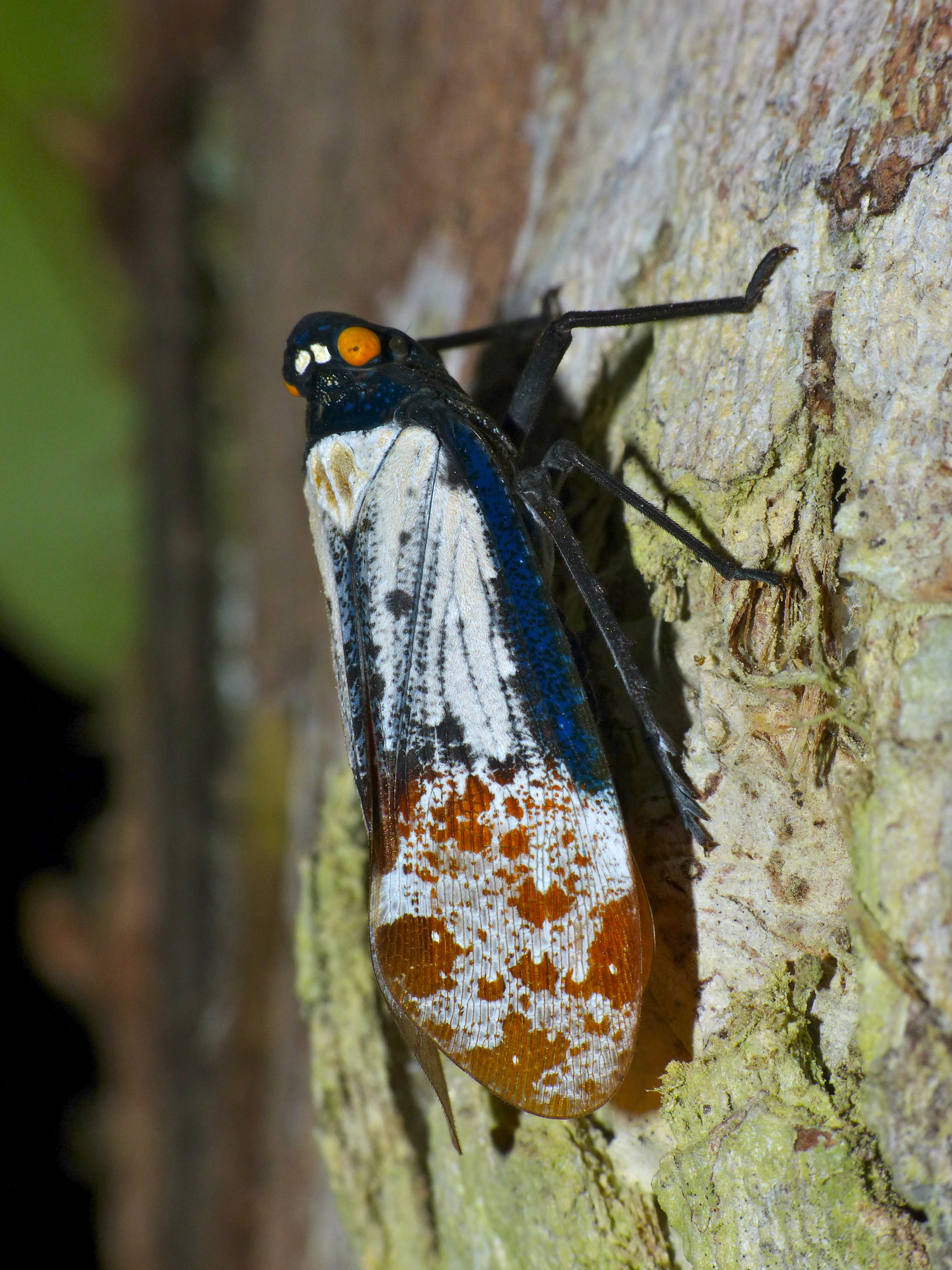
- Penthicodes farinosus scutellaris

Scientific classification
- Domain: Eukaryota
- Kingdom: Animalia
- Phylum: Arthropoda
- Class: Insecta
- Order: Hemiptera
- Suborder: Auchenorrhyncha
- Infraorder: Fulgoromorpha
- Family: Fulgoridae
- Subfamily: Aphaeninae
- Tribe: Aphaenini
- Genus: Penthicodes
- Species: P. farinosus

Binomial name
- Penthicodes farinosus (Weber, 1801)

Synonyms
- Cicada farinosa Weber, 1801

= Penthicodes farinosus =

Species of planthopper

Penthicodes farinosus is a species of planthoppers in the subfamily Aphaeninae (Fulgoridae): with five subspecies distributed in Indo-China and Malesia. The genus name was formerly treated as feminine, but in 2022 it was revised to masculine in accordance with ICZN Article 30.1.4.4, (Note: ICZN Code 30.1.4.4. A compound genus-group name ending in the suffix -ites, -oides, -ides, -odes, or -istes is to be treated as masculine unless its author, when establishing the name, stated that it had another gender or treated it as such by combining it with an adjectival species-group name in another gender form.) changing the spelling of this species' name from farinosa to farinosus.

== Subspecies ==
- P. farinosus aerugineus (Stål, 1870)
- P. farinosus farinosus (Weber, 1801)
- P. farinosus leucosticticus (White, 1845)
- P. farinosus niasensis Schmidt, 1923
- P. farinosus tullia (Breddin, 1901)

== Gallery ==
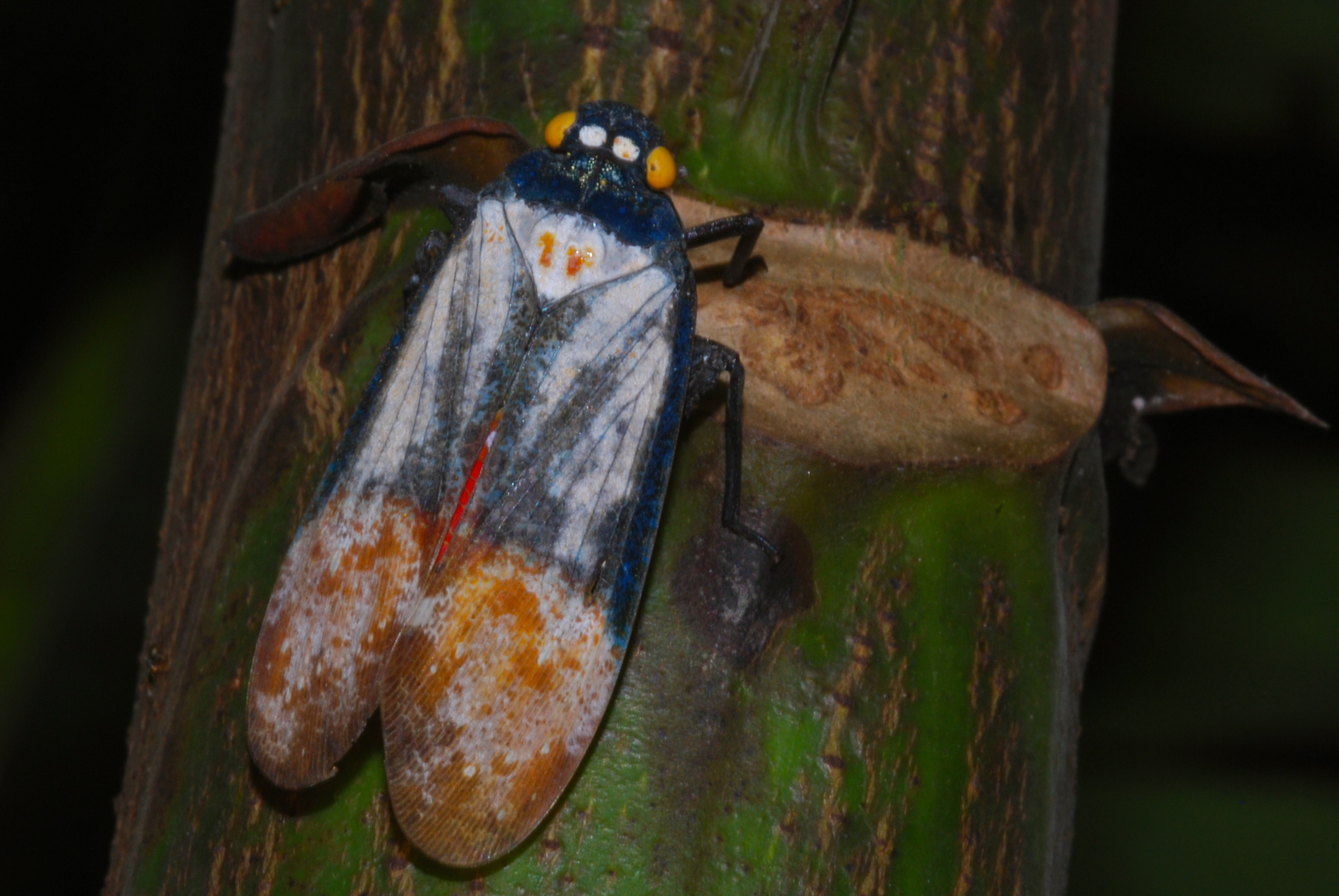
P. farinosus scutellaris

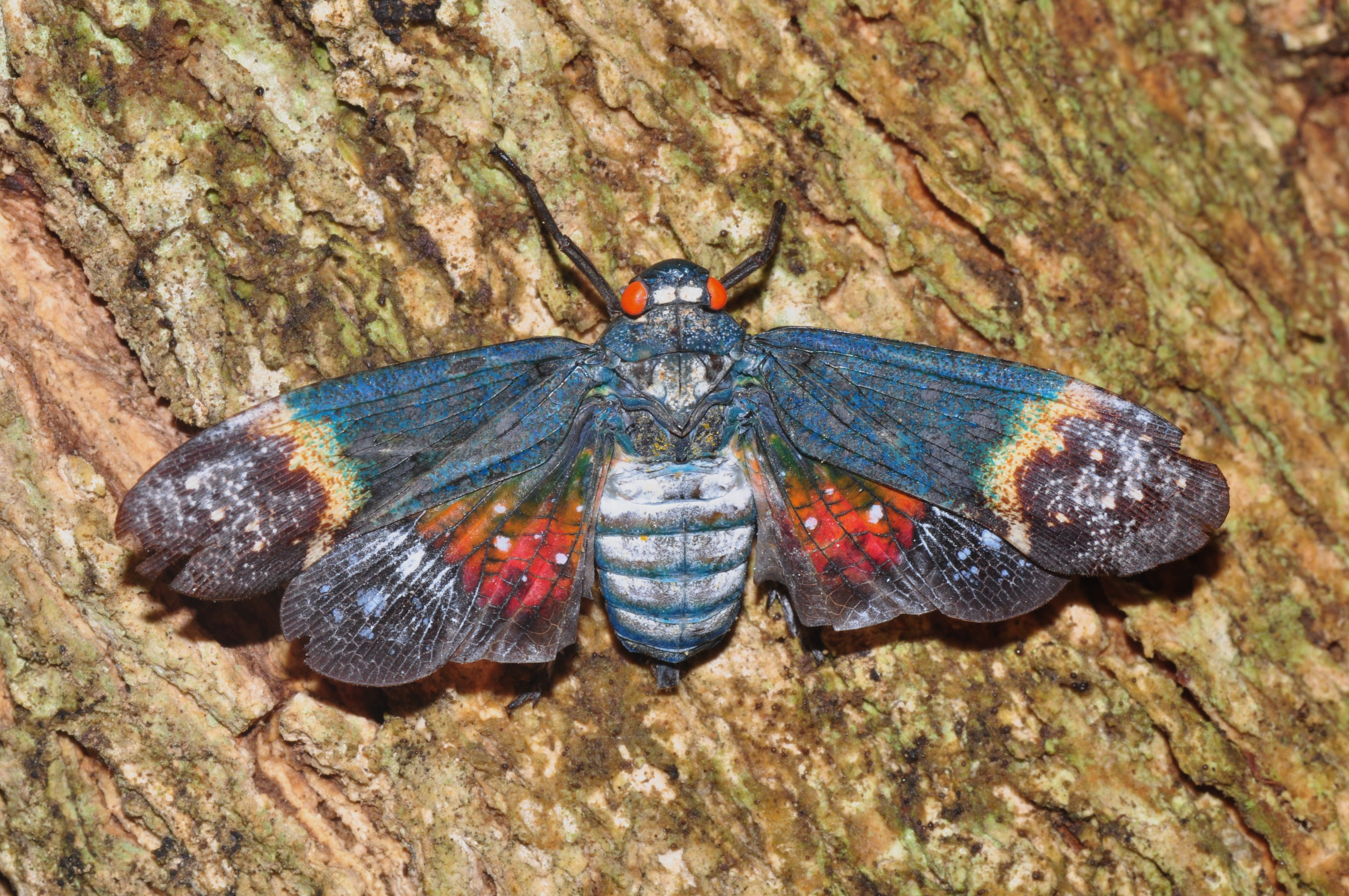
P. farinosus haupti

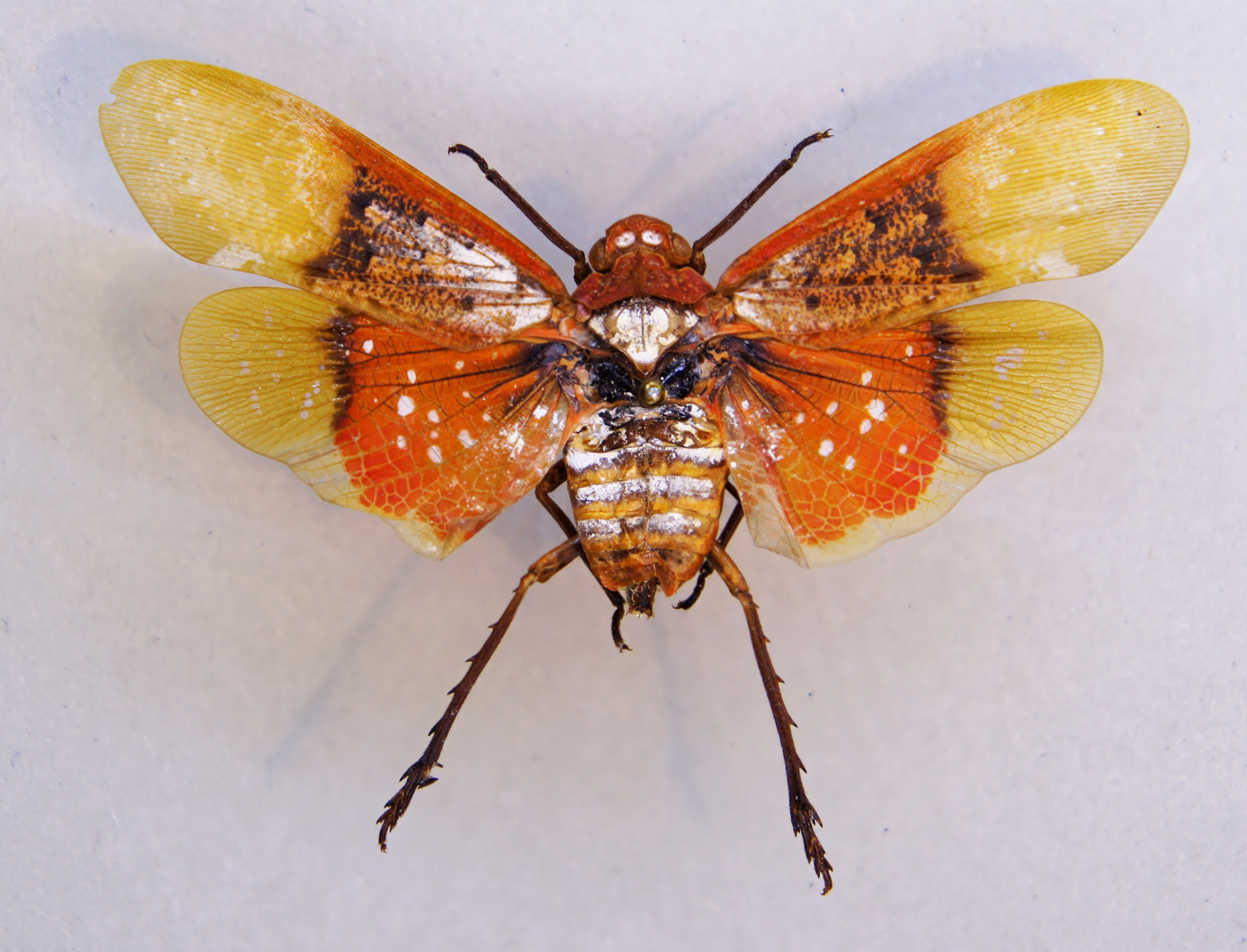
P. farinosus farinosus
