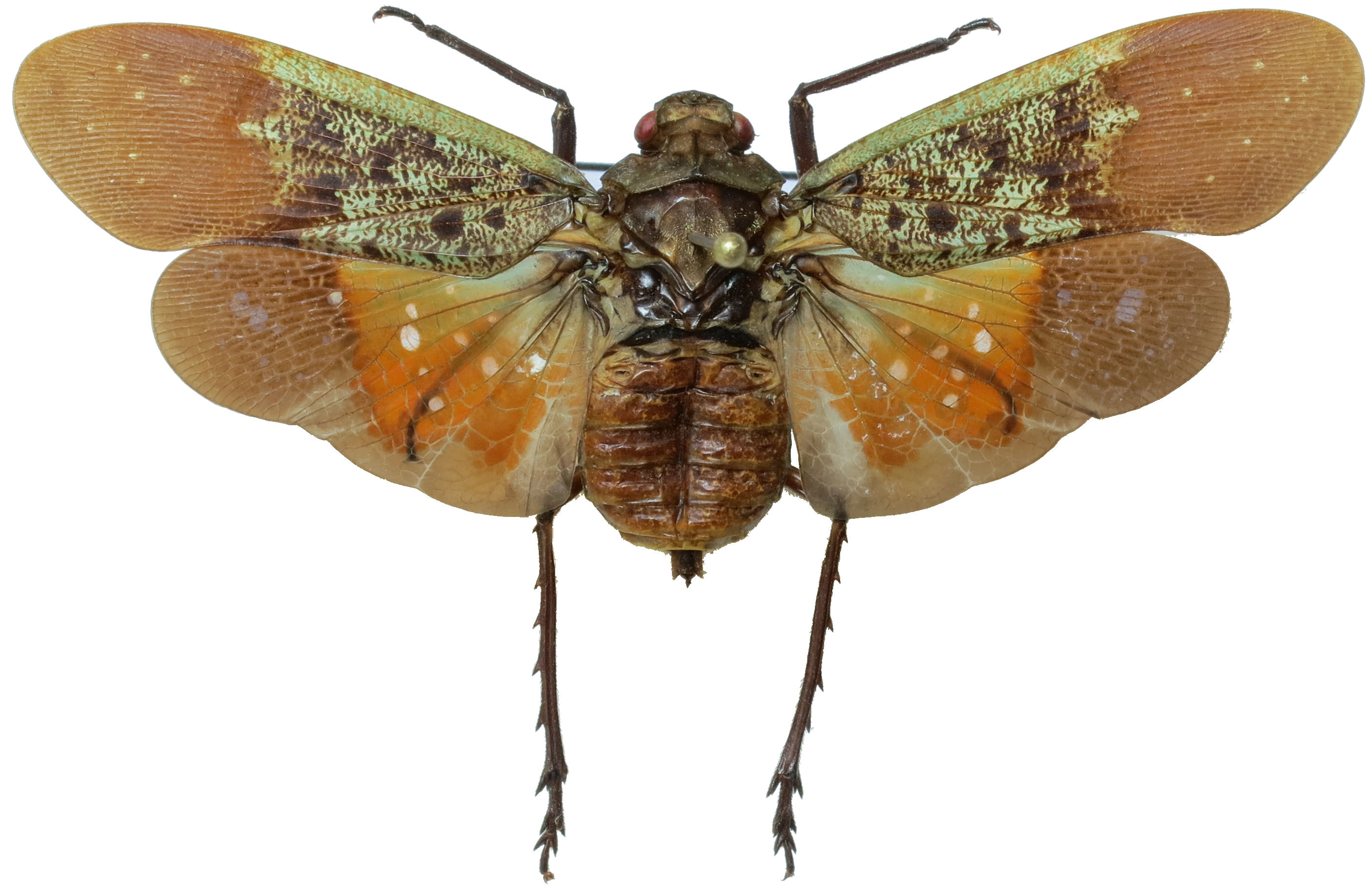
- P. farinosus tullia from Sulawesi

Scientific classification
- Domain: Eukaryota
- Kingdom: Animalia
- Phylum: Arthropoda
- Class: Insecta
- Order: Hemiptera
- Suborder: Auchenorrhyncha
- Infraorder: Fulgoromorpha
- Superfamily: Fulgoroidea
- Family: Fulgoridae
- Subfamily: Aphaeninae
- Tribe: Aphaenini
- Genus: Penthicodes; Blanchard, 1845

Synonyms
- Penthicus Blanchard, 1840

= Penthicodes =

Genus of planthoppers

Penthicodes is a genus of planthoppers belonging to the family Fulgoridae, subfamily Aphaeninae: found in South-East Asia. The genus name was formerly treated as feminine, but in 2022 it was revised to masculine in accordance with ICZN Article 30.1.4.4, (Note: ICZN Code 30.1.4.4. A compound genus-group name ending in the suffix -ites, -oides, -ides, -odes, or -istes is to be treated as masculine unless its author, when establishing the name, stated that it had another gender or treated it as such by combining it with an adjectival species-group name in another gender form.) changing the spelling of several species' names.

== Species ==
Fulgoromorpha Lists On the WEB (FLOW) includes:

Subgenus Penthicodes (Ereosoma) Kirkaldy, 1906

- Penthicodes astraea (Stål, 1864)
- Penthicodes atomaria (Weber, 1801)
- Penthicodes bimaculatus (Schmidt, 1905)
- Penthicodes caja (Walker, 1851)
- Penthicodes celebicus Constant, 2010
- Penthicodes pulchellus (Guérin-Méneville, 1838)
- Penthicodes quadrimaculatus Lallemand, 1963
- Penthicodes rugulosus (Stål, 1870)
- Penthicodes variegatus (Guérin-Méneville, 1829)
- Penthicodes warleti Constant, 2010

Subgenus Penthicodes (Penthicodes) Blanchard, 1845

- Penthicodes farinosus (Weber, 1801)
- Penthicodes nicobaricus (Stål, 1869)
