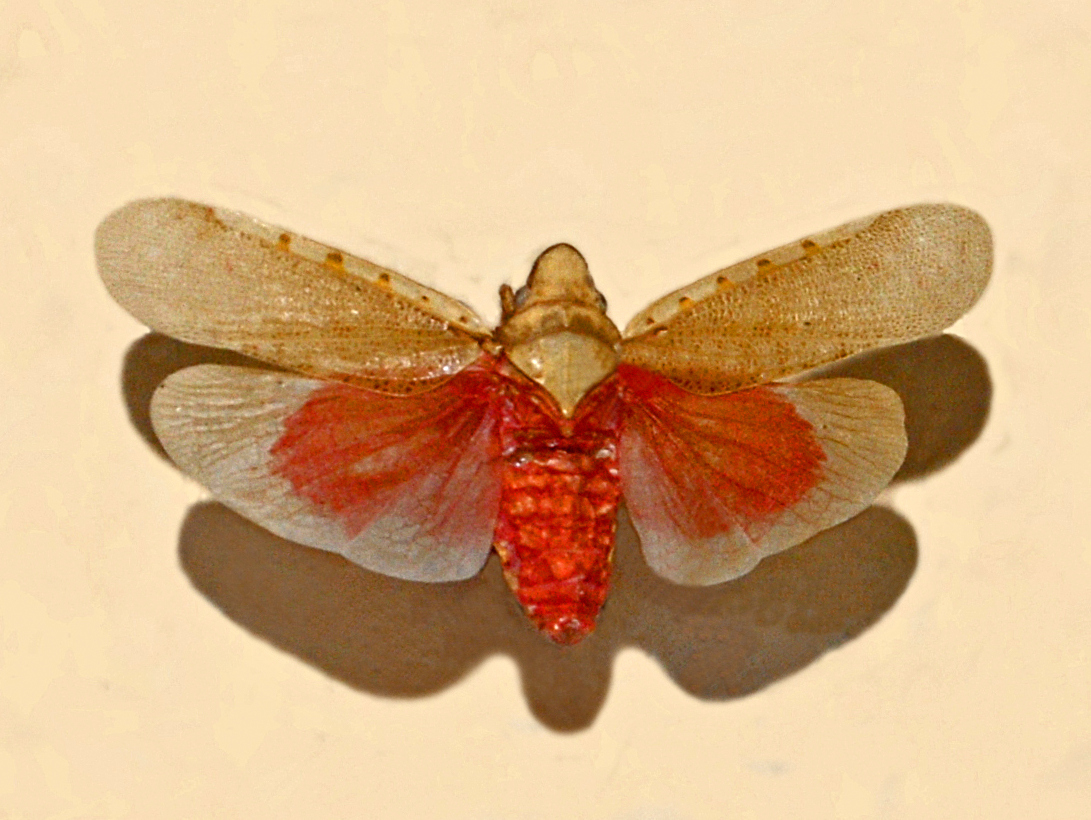
- Omalocephala intermedia from Eritrea. Museum specimen

Scientific classification
- Kingdom: Animalia
- Phylum: Arthropoda
- Class: Insecta
- Order: Hemiptera
- Suborder: Auchenorrhyncha
- Infraorder: Fulgoromorpha
- Family: Fulgoridae
- Genus: Omalocephala
- Species: O. intermedia

Binomial name
- Omalocephala intermedia (Bolivar, 1879)

Synonyms
- Homalocephala intermedia Bolivar, 1879

= Omalocephala intermedia =

Species of true bug

Omalocephala intermedia is a species of lantern fly belonging to the family Fulgoridae.

== Distribution ==
This species can be found in Tanzania and Eritrea.
