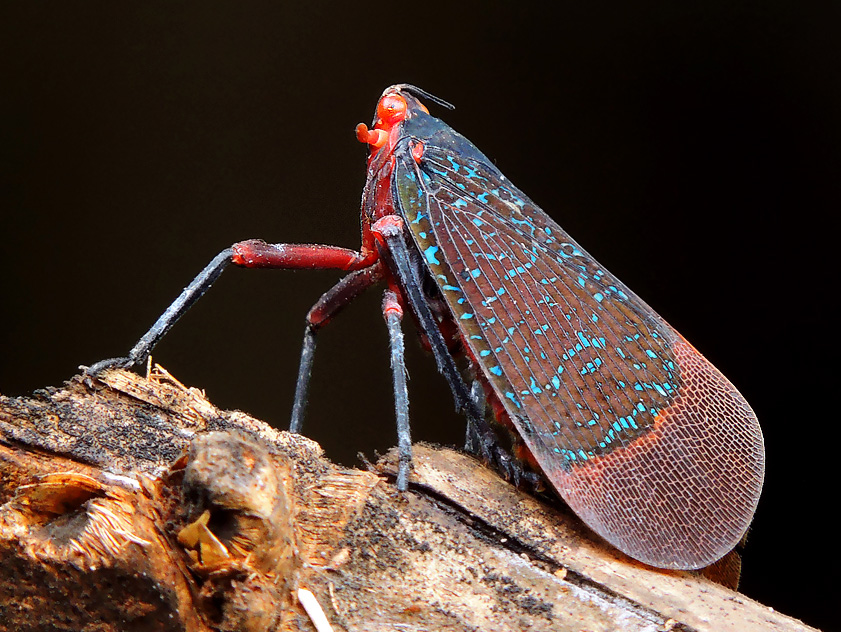
- Kalidasa albiflos

Scientific classification
- Domain: Eukaryota
- Kingdom: Animalia
- Phylum: Arthropoda
- Class: Insecta
- Order: Hemiptera
- Suborder: Auchenorrhyncha
- Infraorder: Fulgoromorpha
- Family: Fulgoridae
- Subfamily: Aphaeninae
- Tribe: Aphaenini
- Genus: Kalidasa; Kirkaldy, 1900

Type species
- Kalidasa sanguinalis (Westwood, 1851)

= Kalidasa (planthopper) =

Genus of planthoppers

Kalidasa is a genus of planthoppers in the tribe Aphaenini of the family Fulgoridae. There are five species in the genus, which are found in different parts of tropical Asia.

== Species ==
Four species are listed in FLOW:

- Kalidasa albiflos (Drury, 1773)
  - synonym Kalidasa lanata
  - synonym Kalidasa dives
- Kalidasa lui Wang & Huang, 1989
- Kalidasa nigromaculata (Gray, 1832)
  - synonym Kalidasa paulinia (Signoret, 1862)
- Kalidasa sanguinalis (Westwood, 1851)
- Kalidasa mythiliae Senthilkumar, 2022

== Description ==
They have a slender and flexible stalk-like outgrowth arising from above the tip of the snout.

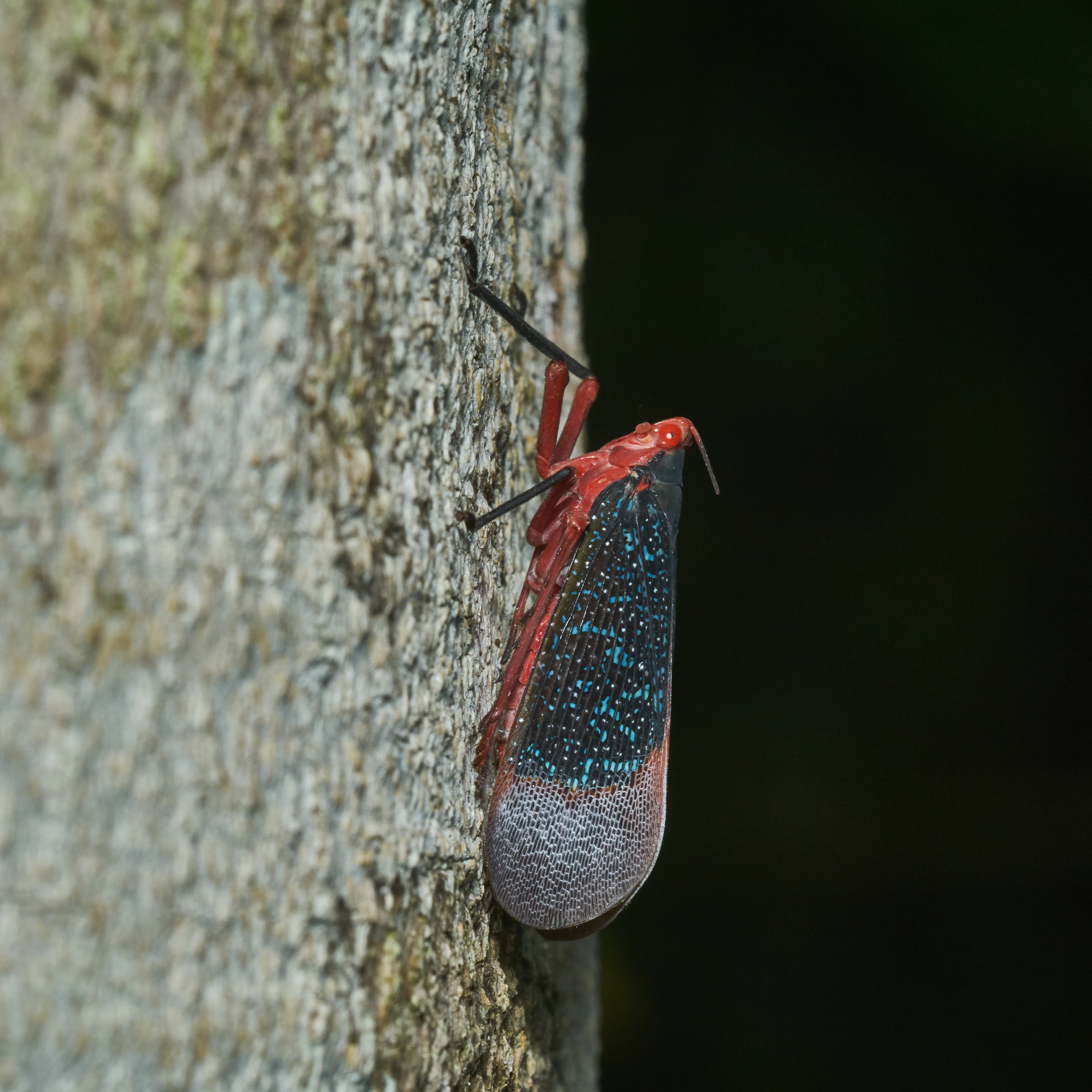
Kalidasa albiflos

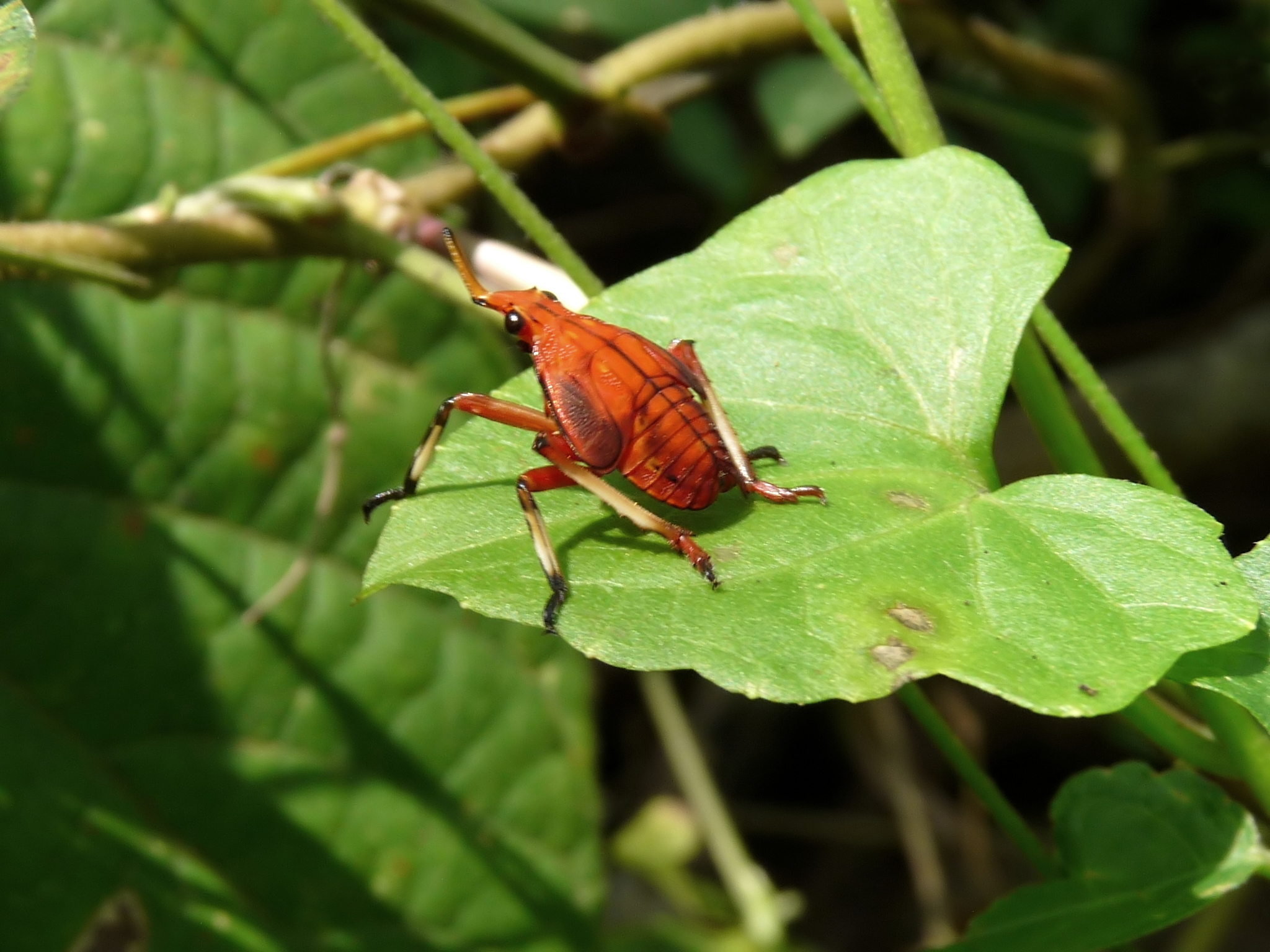
Nymph of a Kalidasa species
