= Egregia (planthopper) =

Scientific classification
- Kingdom: Animalia
- Phylum: Arthropoda
- Class: Insecta
- Order: Hemiptera
- Suborder: Auchenorrhyncha
- Infraorder: Fulgoromorpha
- Family: Fulgoridae
- Subfamily: Aphaeninae
- Tribe: Aphaenini
- Genus: Egregia; Chew Kea Foo, Porion & Audibert, 2010

Species
- See text

Genus of planthoppers

Egregia is a genus of planthoppers in the family Fulgoridae, subfamily Aphaeninae. Species are distributed in Malesia. As of 2020, the number of species increased to 24.

== Species ==
- Egregia brevirostris (Lallemand, 1959), distributed across north, east, and central Borneo Island. The prototypical type-species of the genus.
- Egregia laprincesse (Constant, 2014), found in Sumatra.
- Egregia palawanica (Porion & Audibert, 2020), found in the Philippines.
