= Neoalcathous =

Scientific classification
- Domain: Eukaryota
- Kingdom: Animalia
- Phylum: Arthropoda
- Class: Insecta
- Order: Hemiptera
- Suborder: Auchenorrhyncha
- Infraorder: Fulgoromorpha
- Family: Fulgoridae
- Subfamily: Aphaeninae
- Genus: Neoalcathous; Wang & Huang, 1989

Genus of planthoppers

External image
- Images at flickr

Neoalcathous is a genus of bugs in the family Fulgoridae and subfamily Aphaeninae, erected by Wang Si-Zheng and Huang Ju in 1989. Species have been recorded in China, Vietnam, and Southeast Asia.

== Species ==
Fulgoromorpha Lists On the Web includes:

1. Neoalcathous annamica Constant & Pham, 2018
2. Neoalcathous huangshanana Wang & Huang, 1989 - type species
3. Neoalcathous wuyishanana Wang & Huang, 1989
