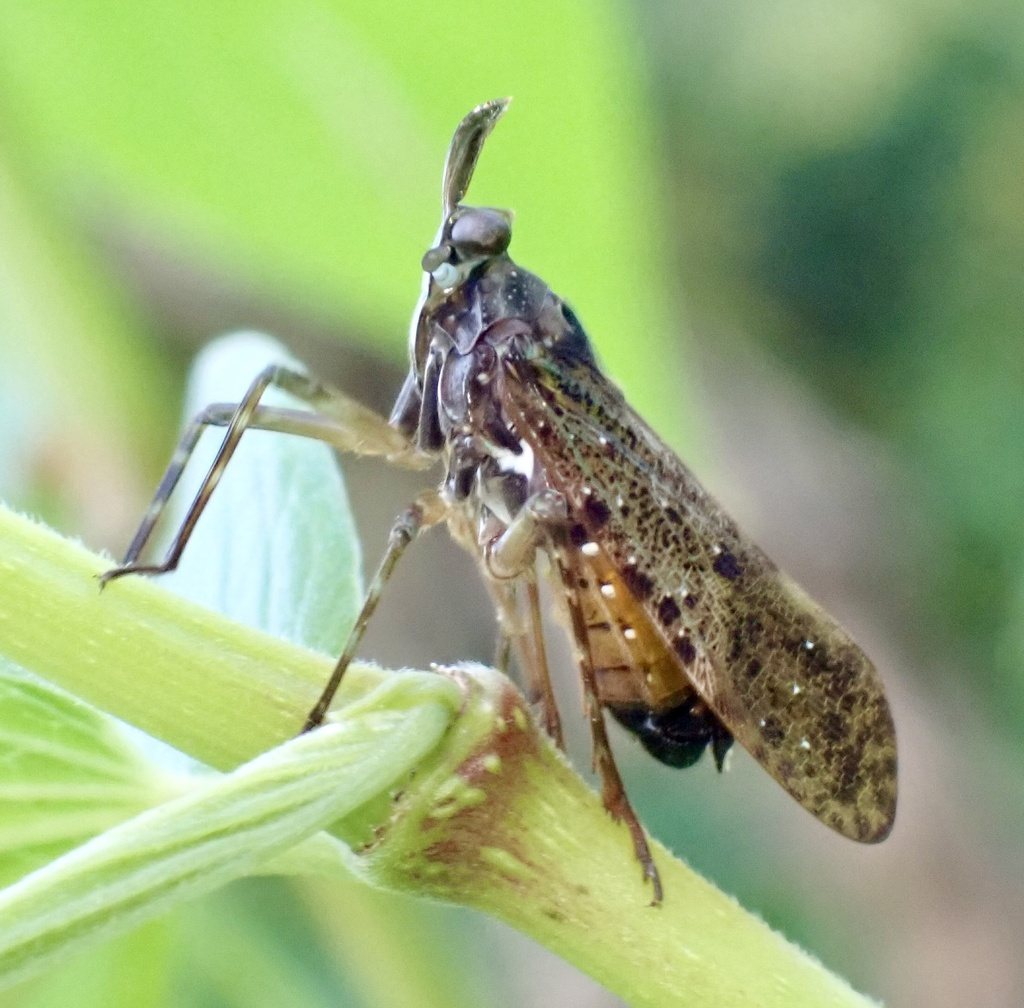
- Ulasia sp.

Scientific classification
- Kingdom: Animalia
- Phylum: Arthropoda
- Clade: Pancrustacea
- Class: Insecta
- Order: Hemiptera
- Suborder: Auchenorrhyncha
- Infraorder: Fulgoromorpha
- Family: Fulgoridae
- Subfamily: Aphaeninae
- Tribe: Aphaenini
- Genus: Ulasia; Stål, 1863

= Ulasia =

Genus of planthoppers

Ulasia is a genus of lanternflies in the subfamily Aphaeninae. Being in the tribe Aphaenini, species in this genus are related to the spotted lanternfly, a major pest in the United States, South Korea, and Japan, having a similar body shape to it.

== Distribution ==
Ulasia is endemic to the island New Guinea, on the Indonesian side.

== Species ==
The Global Biodiversity Information Facility lists the following species:

- Ulasia carnion Fennah, 1977
- Ulasia cynaxa Fennah, 1977
- Ulasia damnorix Fennah, 1977
- Ulasia grothi Schmidt, 1928
- Ulasia magica Stål, 1863
  - Ulasia magica f. procera Schmidt, 1911
- Ulasia maiuma Fennah, 1977
- Ulasia nicophron Fennah, 1977
- Ulasia saundersi Stål, 1863
- Ulasia sophene Fennah, 1977
- Ulasia theano Fennah, 1977
- Ulasia tondota Fennah, 1977
