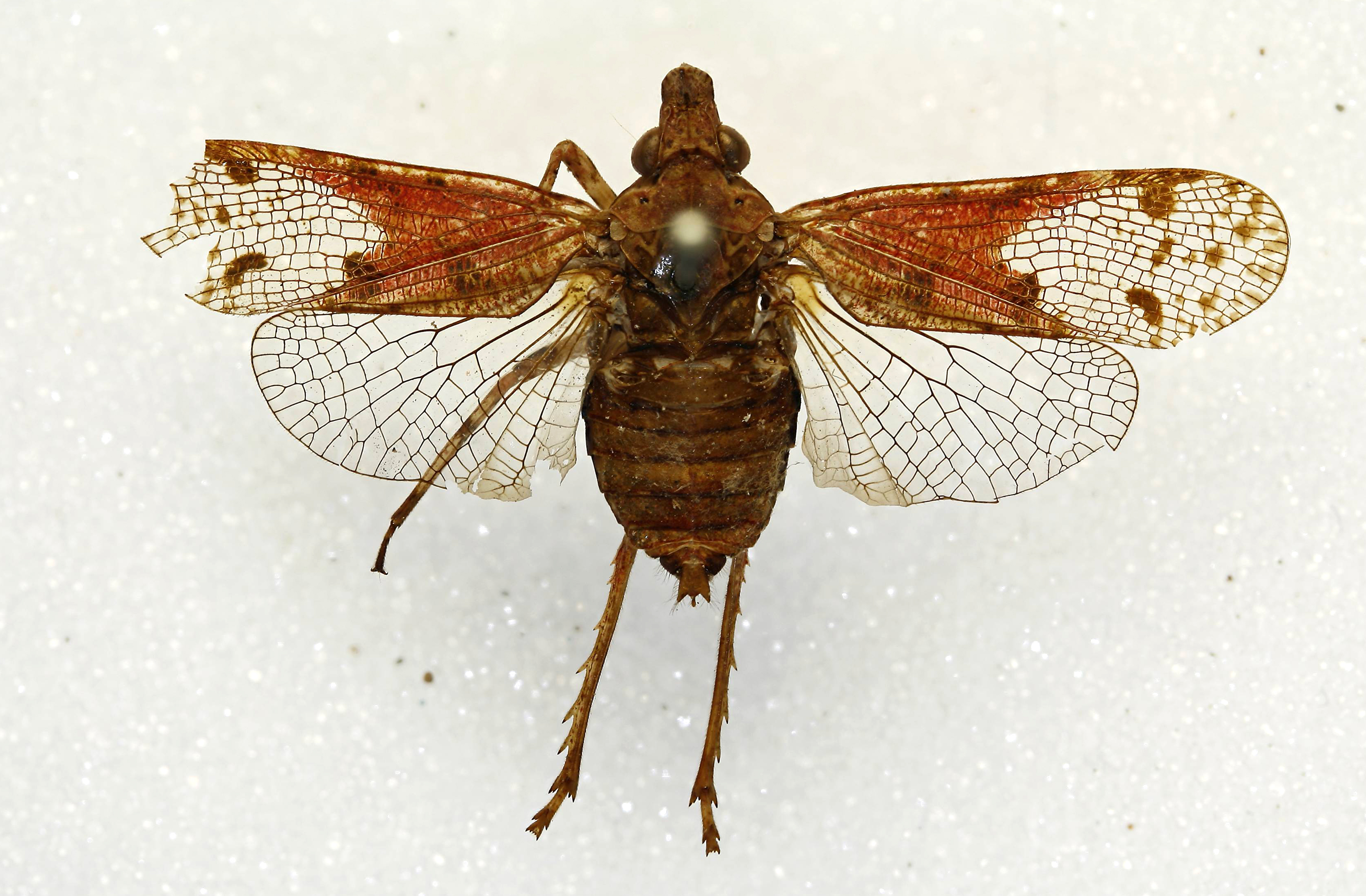
- Hariola tiarata

Scientific classification
- Kingdom: Animalia
- Phylum: Arthropoda
- Clade: Pancrustacea
- Class: Insecta
- Order: Hemiptera
- Suborder: Auchenorrhyncha
- Infraorder: Fulgoromorpha
- Family: Fulgoridae
- Subfamily: Aphaeninae
- Tribe: Pyropsini
- Genus: Hariola; Stål, 1863

= Hariola =

Genus of planthoppers

Hariola is a genus of planthoppers in the tribe Pyropsini. The two known species are found in New Guinea & the Maluku Islands.

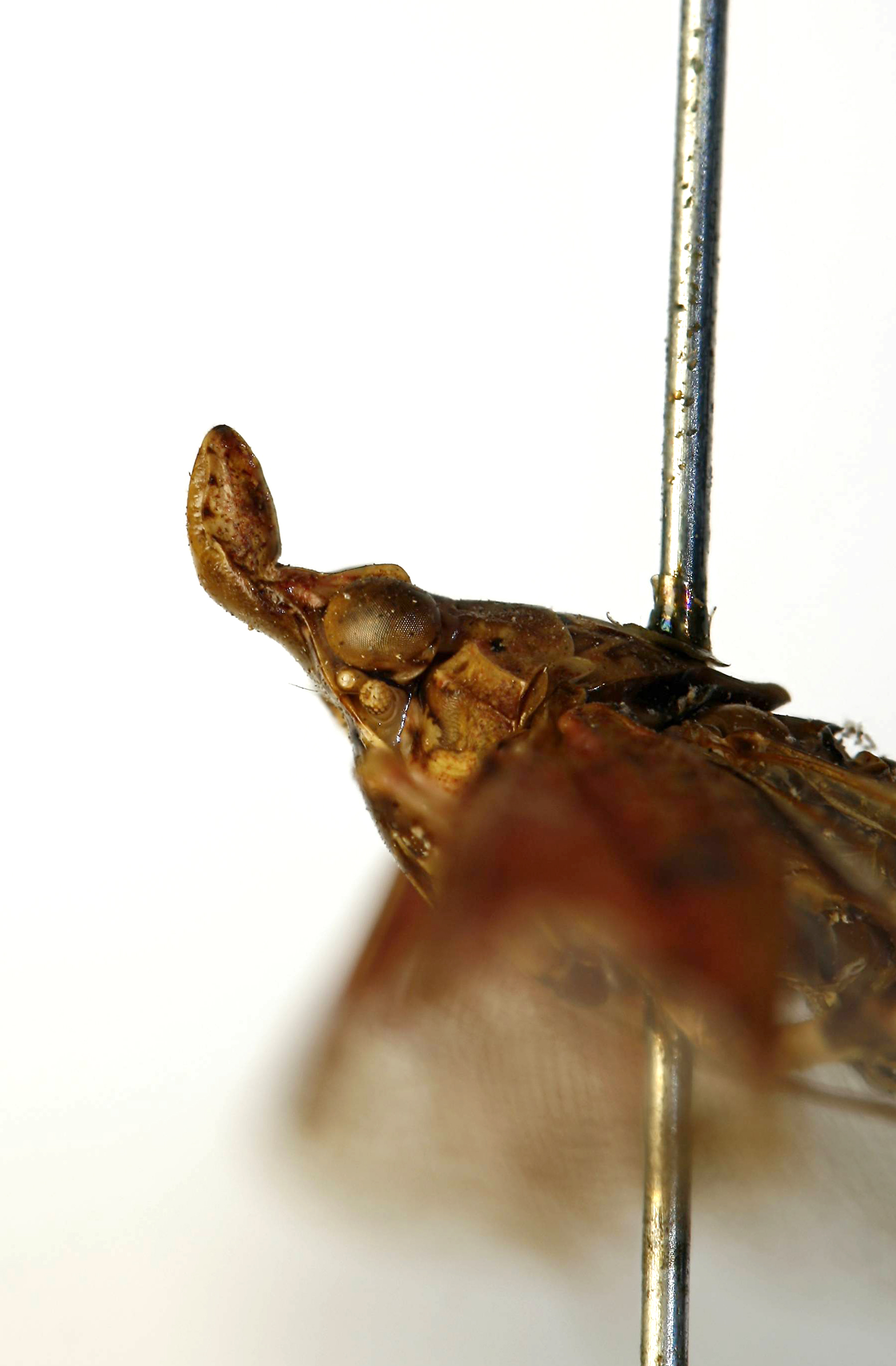
Hariola tiarata head lateral

== Species ==
Two species are included in Fulgoromorpha Lists On the Web:

- Hariola claryi Audibert, Porion & Nagai, 2016
- Hariola tiarata Stål, 1863 – type species
