= Saiva cardinalis =

Scientific classification
- Kingdom: Animalia
- Phylum: Arthropoda
- Class: Insecta
- Order: Hemiptera
- Suborder: Auchenorrhyncha
- Infraorder: Fulgoromorpha
- Family: Fulgoridae
- Genus: Saiva
- Species: S. cardinalis

Binomial name
- Saiva cardinalis (Butler, 1874)

Synonyms
- Fulgora cardinalis Butler, 1874

Species of true bug

Saiva cardinalis is a species of lantern bug in the genus Saiva, found to the North-East of India (Darjiling, Sikkim), Nepal and Vietnam.
