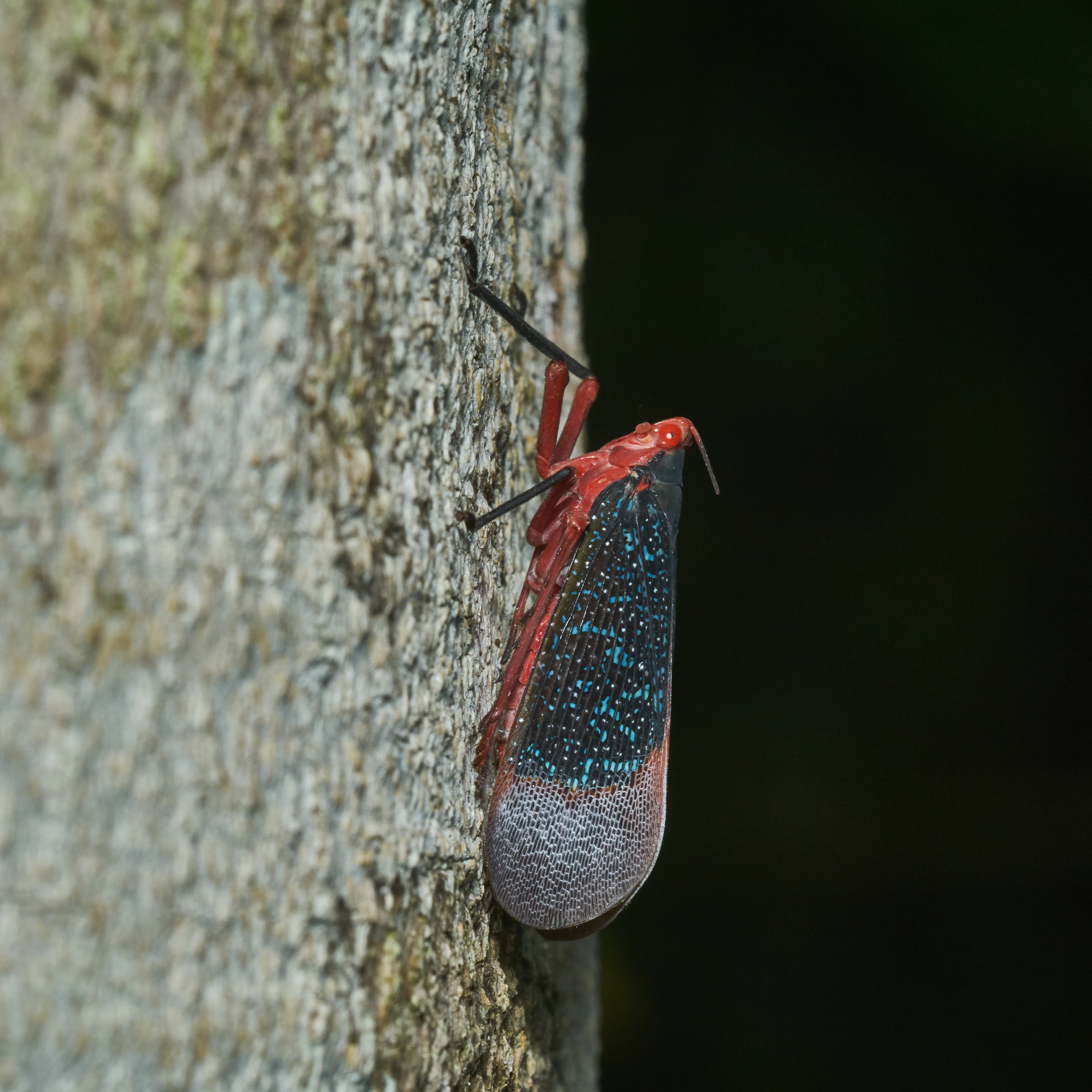
- Kalidasa lanata on Ailanthus triphysa

Scientific classification
- Kingdom: Animalia
- Phylum: Arthropoda
- Class: Insecta
- Order: Hemiptera
- Suborder: Auchenorrhyncha
- Infraorder: Fulgoromorpha
- Family: Fulgoridae
- Genus: Kalidasa
- Species: K. albiflos

Binomial name
- Kalidasa albiflos (Drury, 1773)

Synonyms
- Cicada lanata Drury, 1773; Kalidasa lanata (Drury, 1773); Aphaena albiflos Walker, 1851; Aphaena dives Walker, 1851; Kalidasa dives (Walker, 1851); Euphria walkeri Atkinson, 1885; Kalidasa dives walkeri (Atkinson, 1885)

= Kalidasa albiflos =

Species of planthopper

Kalidasa albiflos is a species of planthopper in the family Fulgoridae found in India. It was previously known as Kalidasa lanata, but it has been proposed that it should be called Kalidasa albiflos, contrary to the principle of priority. This change is due to the fact that Kalidasa lanata was described as Cicada lanata, a name that conflicted with an earlier use of Cicada lanata described by Linnaeus in 1758. In order to avoid homonymy, the next available synonym in line by priority has been selected. They have a slender and flexible stalk-like outgrowth arising from above the tip of the snout.

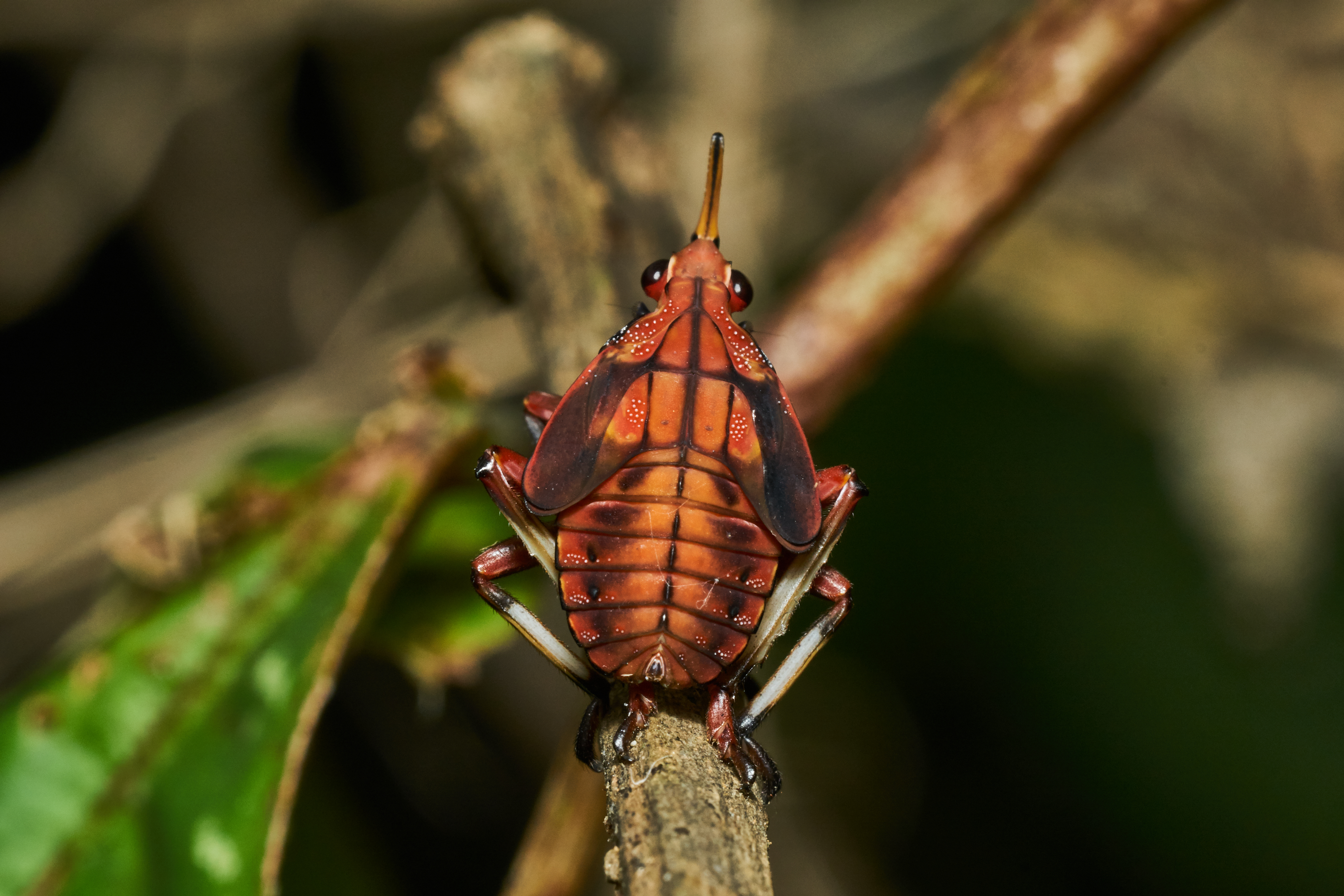
Nymph

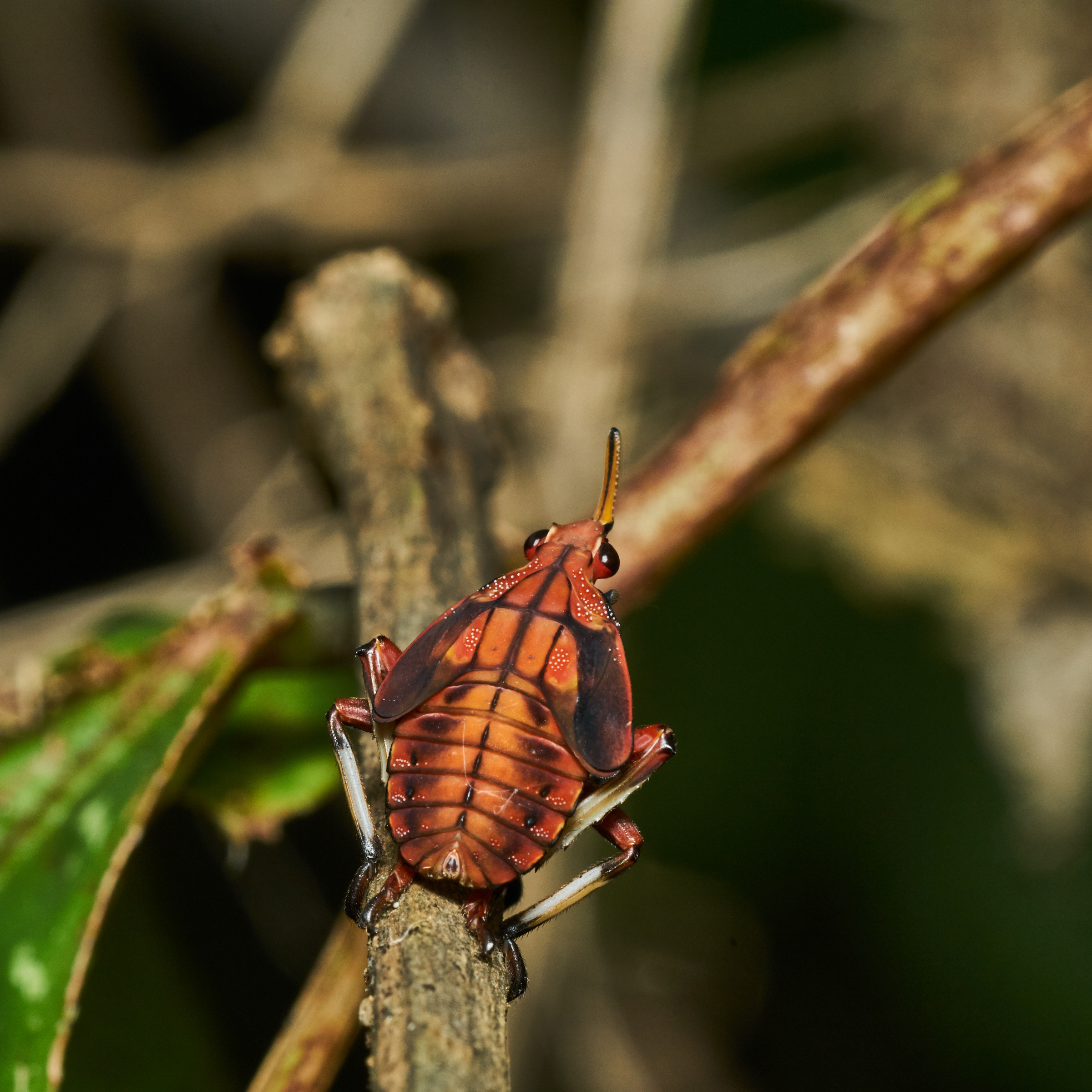
Nymph

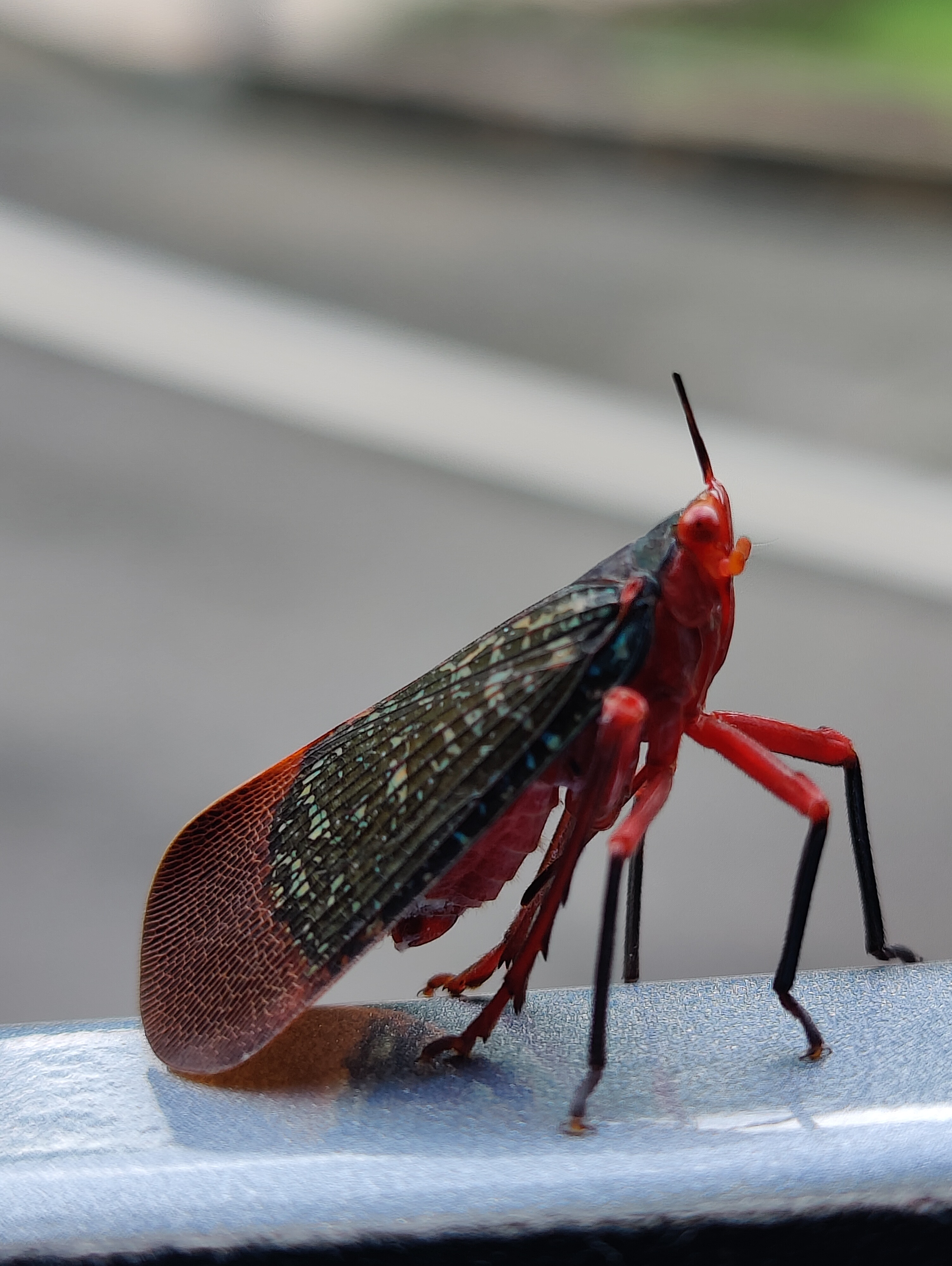
