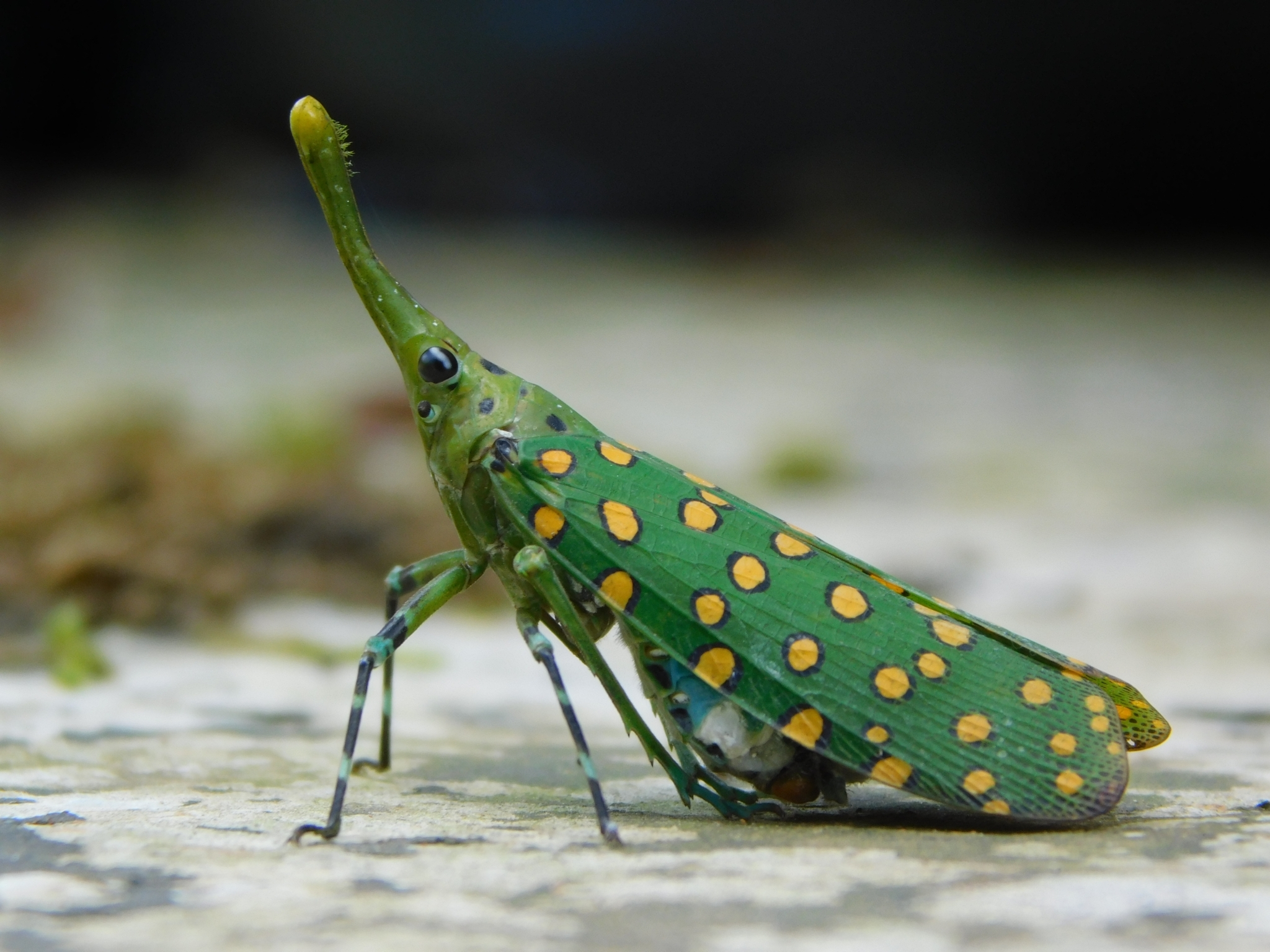
- Saiva nodata

Scientific classification
- Domain: Eukaryota
- Kingdom: Animalia
- Phylum: Arthropoda
- Class: Insecta
- Order: Hemiptera
- Suborder: Auchenorrhyncha
- Infraorder: Fulgoromorpha
- Family: Fulgoridae
- Tribe: Pyropsini
- Genus: Saiva; Distant, 1906

Type species
- Saiva gemmata (Westwood, 1848)

= Saiva =

Genus of planthoppers

Saiva is a genus of Asian planthoppers, family Fulgoridae. They are colourful insects, marked boldly in red, blue, white and black, with a prominent slender stalk like structure arising on the head that points upwards or forward. The known distribution is from India, China and Indochina.

== Species ==
The World Auchenorrhyncha Database includes:

1. Saiva bullata (Distant, 1891)
2. Saiva cardinalis (Butler, 1874)
3. Saiva coccinea (Walker, 1858)
4. Saiva constanti Jiaranaisakul, 2024
5. Saiva decorata (Westwood, 1839)
6. Saiva formosana Kato, 1929
7. Saiva gemmata (Westwood, 1848) - type species
8. Saiva guttulata (Westwood, 1842)
9. Saiva insularis (Kirby, 1891)
10. Saiva karimbujangi Chew Kea Foo & Porion, 2007
11. Saiva nodata Distant, 1906
12. Saiva transversolineata (Baker, 1925)
13. Saiva virescens (Westwood, 1842)
