= Datua =

Scientific classification
- Domain: Eukaryota
- Kingdom: Animalia
- Phylum: Arthropoda
- Class: Insecta
- Order: Hemiptera
- Suborder: Auchenorrhyncha
- Infraorder: Fulgoromorpha
- Family: Fulgoridae
- Subfamily: Aphaeninae
- Tribe: Pyropsini
- Genus: Datua; Schmidt, 1911
- Species: D. bisinuata

Binomial name
- Datua bisinuata Schmidt, 1911

Genus of planthoppers

Datua is a genus of planthoppers containing the single species Datua bisinuata and placed in the tribe Pyropsini. The species is found in Borneo and Sumatra.
