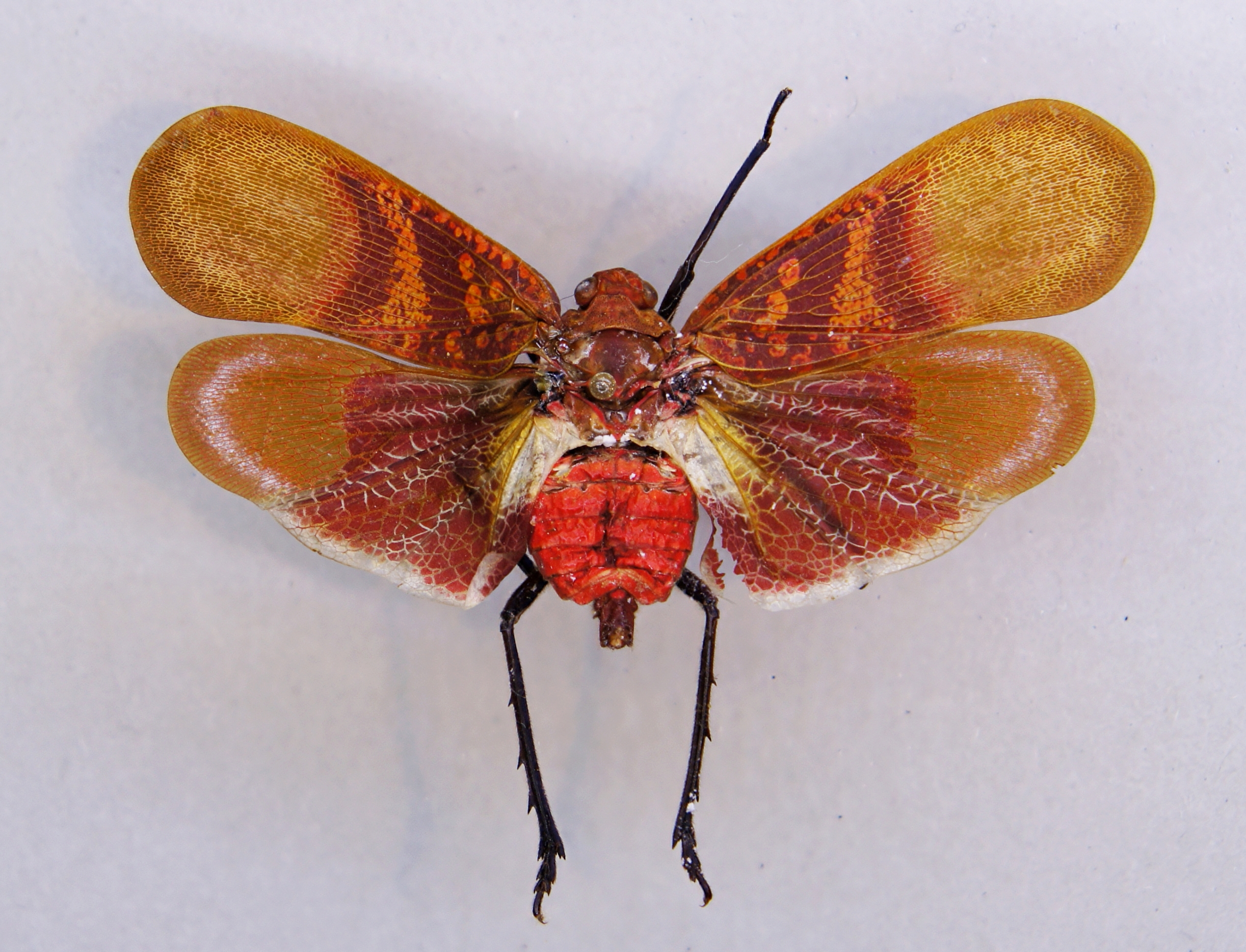
- Scamandra rosea

Scientific classification
- Kingdom: Animalia
- Phylum: Arthropoda
- Clade: Pancrustacea
- Class: Insecta
- Order: Hemiptera
- Suborder: Auchenorrhyncha
- Infraorder: Fulgoromorpha
- Family: Fulgoridae
- Tribe: Aphaenini
- Genus: Scamandra; Stål, 1863

= Scamandra =

Genus of planthoppers

Scamandra is a genus of planthoppers in the subfamily Aphaeninae (Fulgoridae): found in Malesia.

== Species ==
The Fulgoromorpha Lists on the Web (FLOW) reecognises the following species:

1. Scamandra agnes Nagai & Porion, 2002
2. Scamandra castanea Constant, 2017
3. Scamandra clytaemnestra Breddin, 1901
4. Scamandra collaris Constant, 2017
5. Scamandra crinita Schmidt, 1906
6. Scamandra daphne (Stål, 1863)
7. Scamandra detanii Nagai & Porion, 2002
8. Scamandra diana Distant, 1892
9. Scamandra hecuba Stål, 1863
10. Scamandra hermione Stål, 1864
11. Scamandra huangi Constant, 2013
12. Scamandra jakli Rolcík, 2008
13. Scamandra lachesis Stål, 1863
14. Scamandra leilae Chew Kea Foo, Porion & Audibert, 2010
15. Scamandra lumawigi Constant, 2013
16. Scamandra lydia Stål, 1870
17. Scamandra mangolana Constant, 2017
18. Scamandra marcellae Porion, Audibert & Nagai, 2016
19. Scamandra mucorea Gerstaecker, 1895
20. Scamandra multimaculata Audibert & Porion, 2018
21. Scamandra polychroma Gerstaecker, 1895
22. Scamandra pocerattui Porion & Audibert, 2019
23. Scamandra rosea (Guérin-Méneville, 1834) - type species
24. Scamandra sanana Constant, 2017
25. Scamandra sanguiflua (Stål, 1863)
26. Scamandra selene Breddin, 1901
27. Scamandra semele Stål, 1863
28. Scamandra shiinae Nagai & Porion, 2004
29. Scamandra silighinii Audibert & Porion, 2018
30. Scamandra stanjakli Constant, 2013
31. Scamandra tamborana Lallemand, 1960
32. Scamandra thetis (Stål, 1863)
33. Scamandra undulata Lallemand, 1959
34. Scamandra vanvyvei Constant, 2013
35. Scamandra voisinae Nagai & Porion, 2002

== Gallery ==
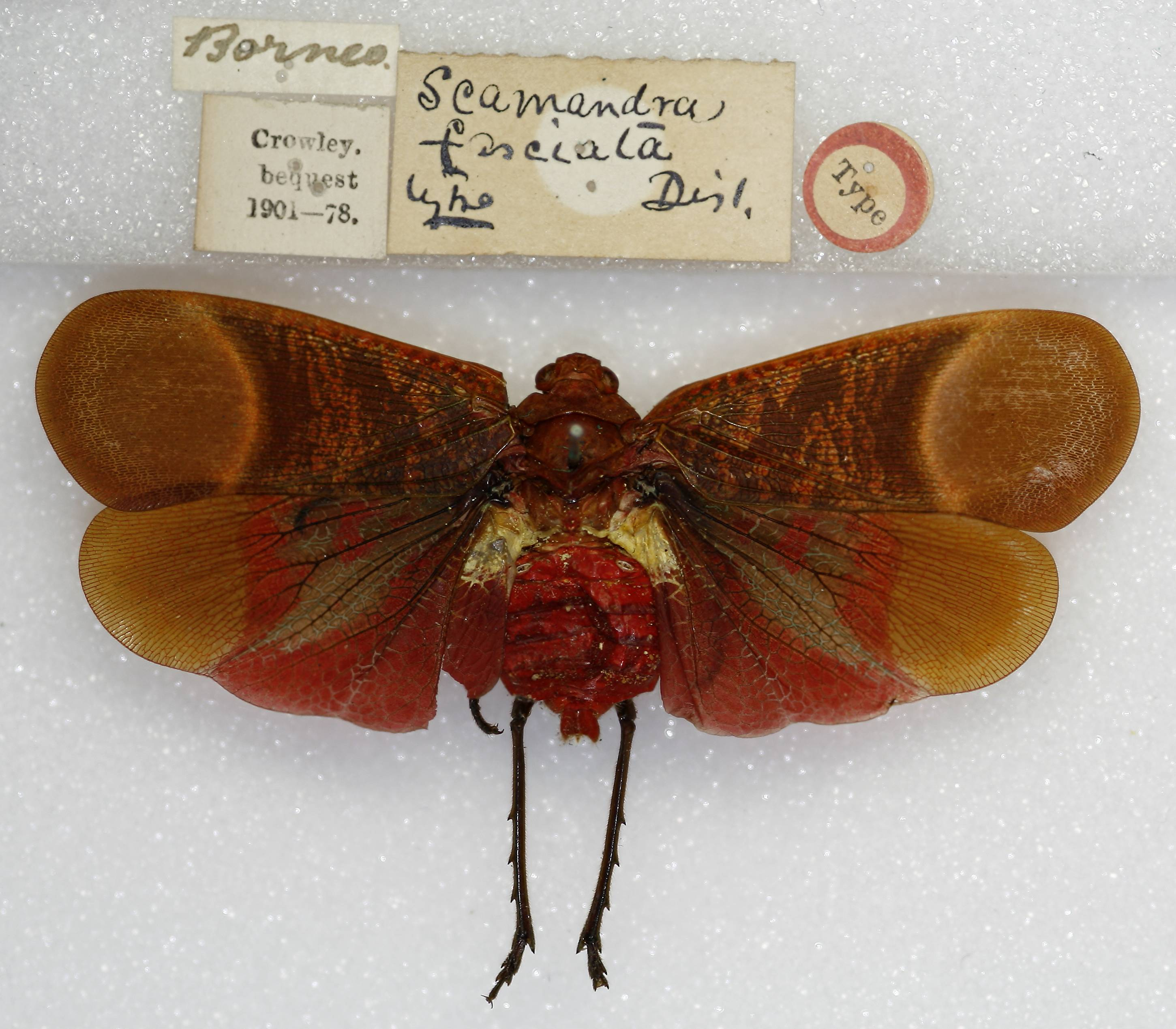
S. fasciata

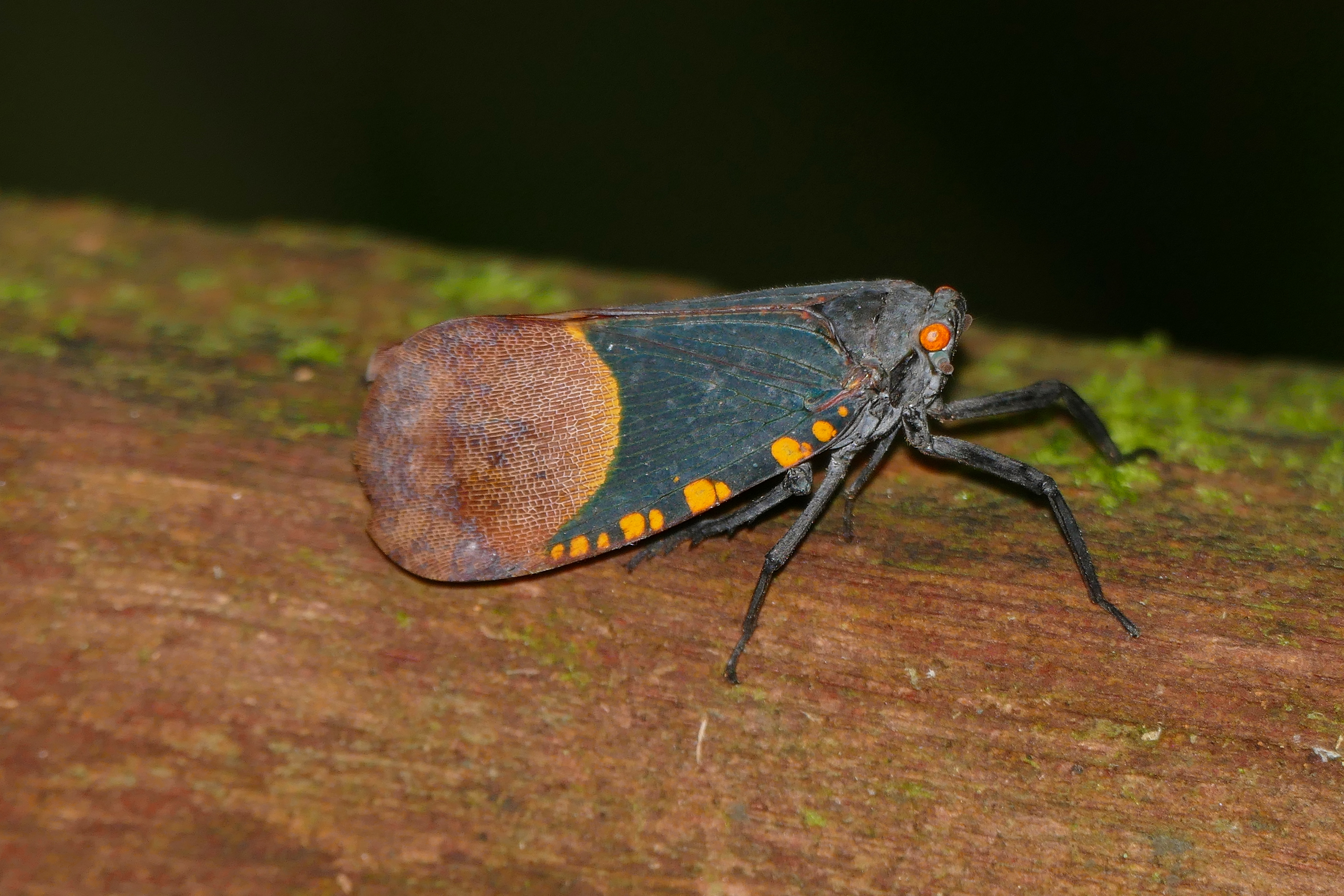
S. polychroma

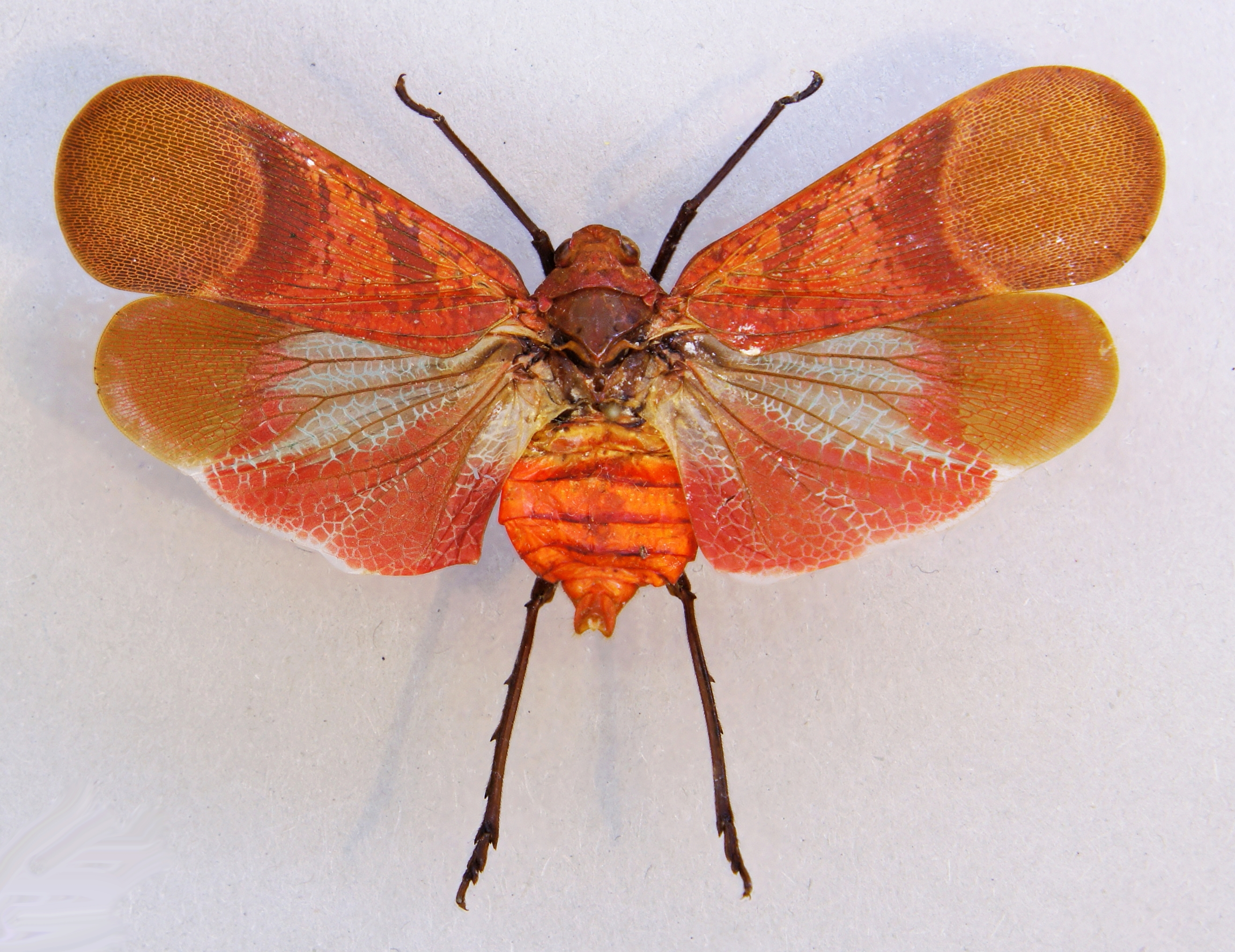
S. varicolor
