= Calmar punctata =

Scientific classification
- Domain: Eukaryota
- Kingdom: Animalia
- Phylum: Arthropoda
- Class: Insecta
- Order: Hemiptera
- Suborder: Auchenorrhyncha
- Infraorder: Fulgoromorpha
- Family: Fulgoridae
- Subfamily: Aphaeninae
- Tribe: Aphaenini
- Genus: Calmar; Kirkaldy, 1901
- Species: C. punctata

Binomial name
- Calmar punctata (Signoret, 1850)

Synonyms
- Lystra punctata Signoret, 1850

Species of planthopper

Calmar is a monotypic genus of planthopper in the family Fulgoridae, presently comprising a single species Calmar punctata, known from Senegal and Gambia.
