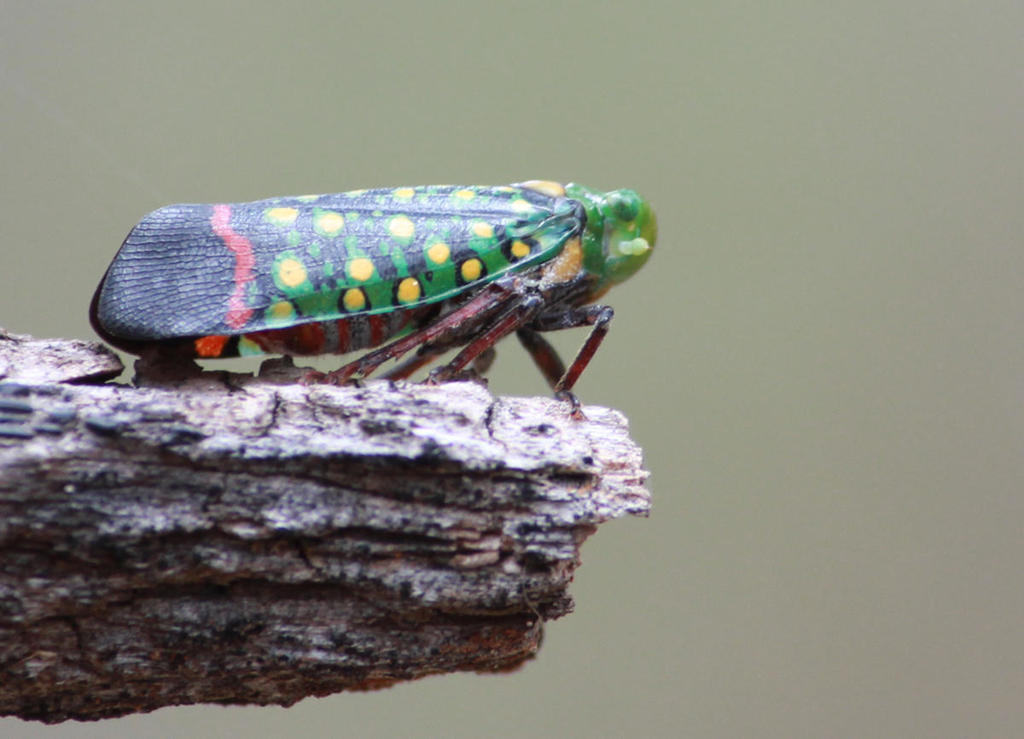
- Eddara euchroma

Scientific classification
- Kingdom: Animalia
- Phylum: Arthropoda
- Class: Insecta
- Order: Hemiptera
- Suborder: Auchenorrhyncha
- Infraorder: Fulgoromorpha
- Family: Fulgoridae
- Subfamily: Aphaeninae
- Tribe: Aphaenini
- Genus: Eddara; Walker, 1858

Type species
- Eddara euchroma Walker, 1858

= Eddara =

Genus of planthoppers

Eddara is a genus of lanternflies in the tribe Aphaenini. Species in this genus are commonly known as the painted snout bugs, reminiscent of their colorful and ornate patterned bodies.

== Distribution ==
Eddara species are found in Southeastern Africa. They have been found in Kenya, Uganda, Tanzania, Malawi, Mozambique, Zimbabwe, Botswana, South Africa, and Eswatini.

== Species ==
The following species are placed in the genus Eddara:

- Eddara catenaria Distant, 1906 - East African painted snout bug
- Eddara costalis Lallemand, 1928
- Eddara euchroma Walker, 1858 - Southern African painted snout bug
  - Eddara euchroma var. bella Stål, 1959
- Eddara imperialis Fennah, 1958
- Eddara sonora Melichar, 1912
- Eddara viridiceps (Fabricius, 1803)
