= Limois =

Scientific classification
- Domain: Eukaryota
- Kingdom: Animalia
- Phylum: Arthropoda
- Class: Insecta
- Order: Hemiptera
- Suborder: Auchenorrhyncha
- Infraorder: Fulgoromorpha
- Family: Fulgoridae
- Subfamily: Aphaeninae
- Tribe: Limoisini
- Genus: Limois; Stål, 1863

Synonyms
- †Oxycephala Hong, 1979

Genus of planthoppers

External image
- Images at iNaturalist

Limois is a genus of Asian bugs in the subfamily Aphaeninae and tribe Limoisini, erected by Carl Stål in 1863. Species have been recorded from: West Himalayas (Uttaranchal, Tibet), Bangladesh, China (including Taiwan and Liaoning, Manchuria), Korea, Russia (Primorsky Krai), Myanmar and Vietnam.

== Species ==
1. Limois bifasciatus Ollenbach, 1928
2. Limois chagyabensis Chou & Lu, 1981
3. Limois emelianovi Oshanin, 1908
4. Limois guangxiensis Chou & Wang, 1985
5. Limois hunanensis Chou & Wang, 1985
6. Limois kikuchii Kato, 1932
7. †Limois pardalis Zhang, 1989
8. †Limois shanwangensis (Hong, 1979)
9. Limois sonlaensis Constant & Pham, 2022
10. Limois sordidus Wang, Xu, Constant & Qin, 2020
11. Limois westwoodii (Hope, 1843) - type species
