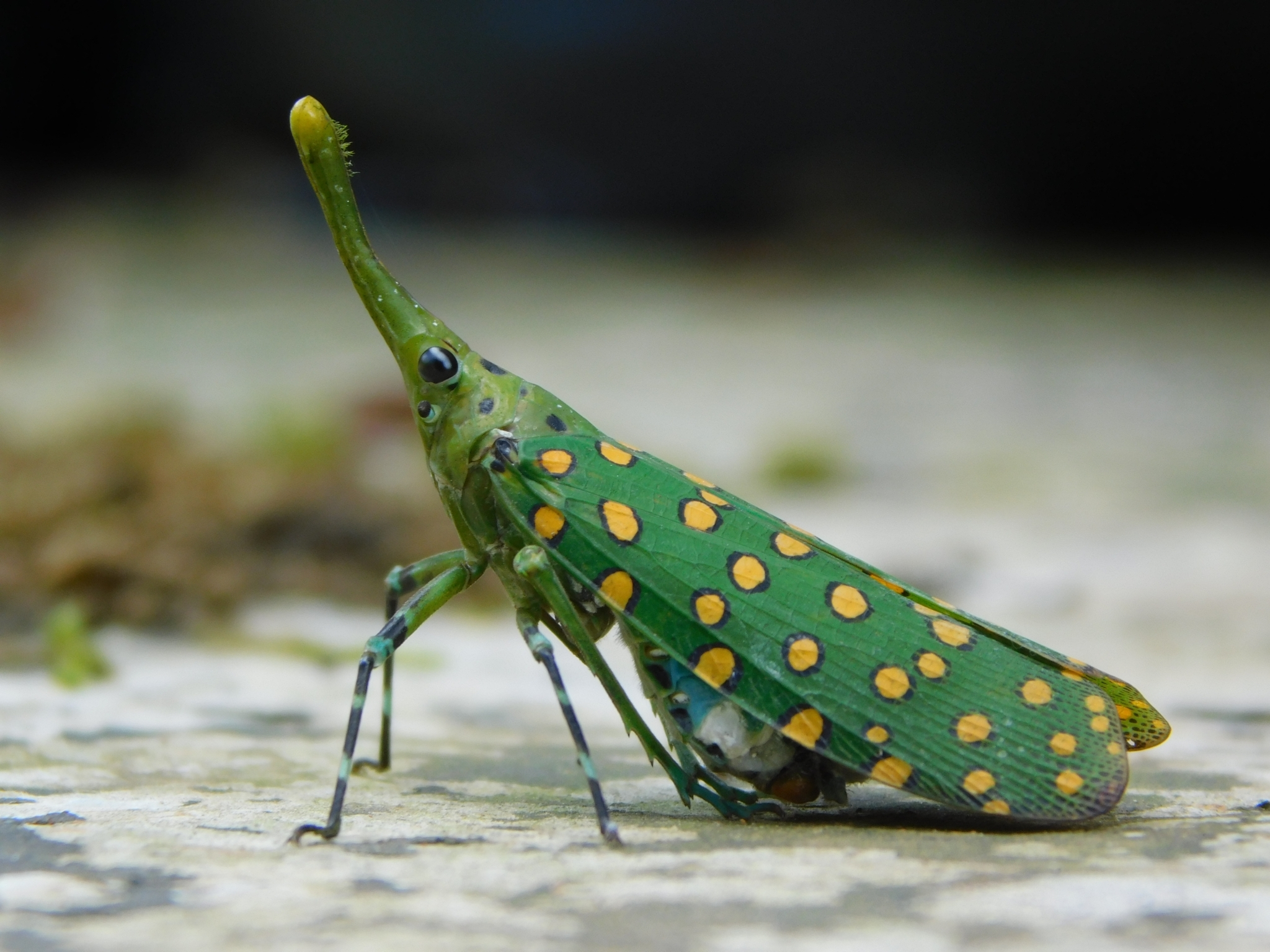

Scientific classification
- Kingdom: Animalia
- Phylum: Arthropoda
- Clade: Pancrustacea
- Class: Insecta
- Order: Hemiptera
- Suborder: Auchenorrhyncha
- Infraorder: Fulgoromorpha
- Family: Fulgoridae
- Genus: Saiva
- Species: S. nodata

Binomial name
- Saiva nodata Distant, 1906

= Saiva nodata =

Species of insect

Saiva nodata is a species of lanternfly. It is endemic to Karnataka in the Western Ghats.

== Identification ==
It can be distinguished from other Saiva species by the thickness of the head's projection (which is also known as a cephalic process). The overall colour can further aid in identification.
