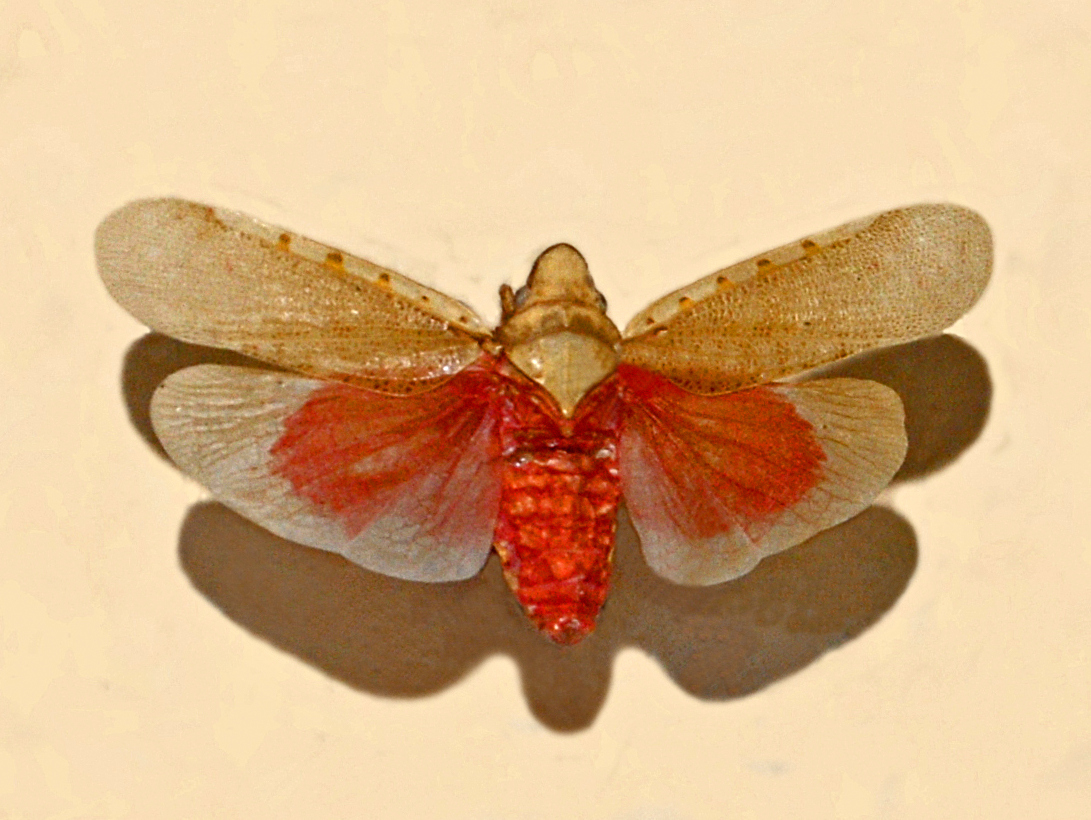
- Omalocephala intermedia

Scientific classification
- Domain: Eukaryota
- Kingdom: Animalia
- Phylum: Arthropoda
- Class: Insecta
- Order: Hemiptera
- Suborder: Auchenorrhyncha
- Infraorder: Fulgoromorpha
- Family: Fulgoridae
- Subfamily: Aphaeninae
- Tribe: Aphaenini
- Genus: Omalocephala; Spinola, 1839

= Omalocephala =

Genus of planthoppers

Omalocephala is a genus of planthoppers belonging to the family Fulgoridae.

== Species ==
Fulgoromorpha Lists On the WEB (FLOW) includes:

- Omalocephala cincta (Fabricius, 1803) - West Africa
- Omalocephala festiva (Fabricius, 1781) - type species - India (Tamil Nadu), Sri Lanka
- Omalocephala intermedia (Bolivar, 1879) - Tanzania (Zanzibar)
