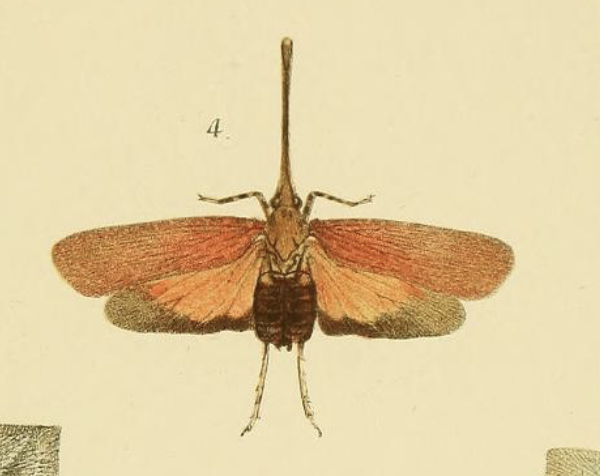
- Saiva insularis, original figure

Scientific classification
- Domain: Eukaryota
- Kingdom: Animalia
- Phylum: Arthropoda
- Class: Insecta
- Order: Hemiptera
- Suborder: Auchenorrhyncha
- Infraorder: Fulgoromorpha
- Family: Fulgoridae
- Genus: Saiva
- Species: S. insularis

Binomial name
- Saiva insularis (Kirby, 1891)

Synonyms
- Hotinus insularis Kirby, 1891

= Saiva insularis =

Species of lanternfly

Saiva insularis is a species of lanternfly from Sri Lanka and India.

== Identification ==
This species is similar to Saiva coccinea and Prolepta decorata. It can be differentiated from both by orange hindwings, which are red or orange-red in the other species, respectively. Prolepta decorata does not occur within its range, and is known from Java. In comparison with S. coccinea, which shares its range with this species, S. insularis has a longer cephalic process (the head is approximately as long as tegmen vs in coccinea the head slightly shorter than tegmina), which is slightly expanded at its apex.

It also differs from both the other species as the abdomen is dark brown (not bright red) dorsally.
