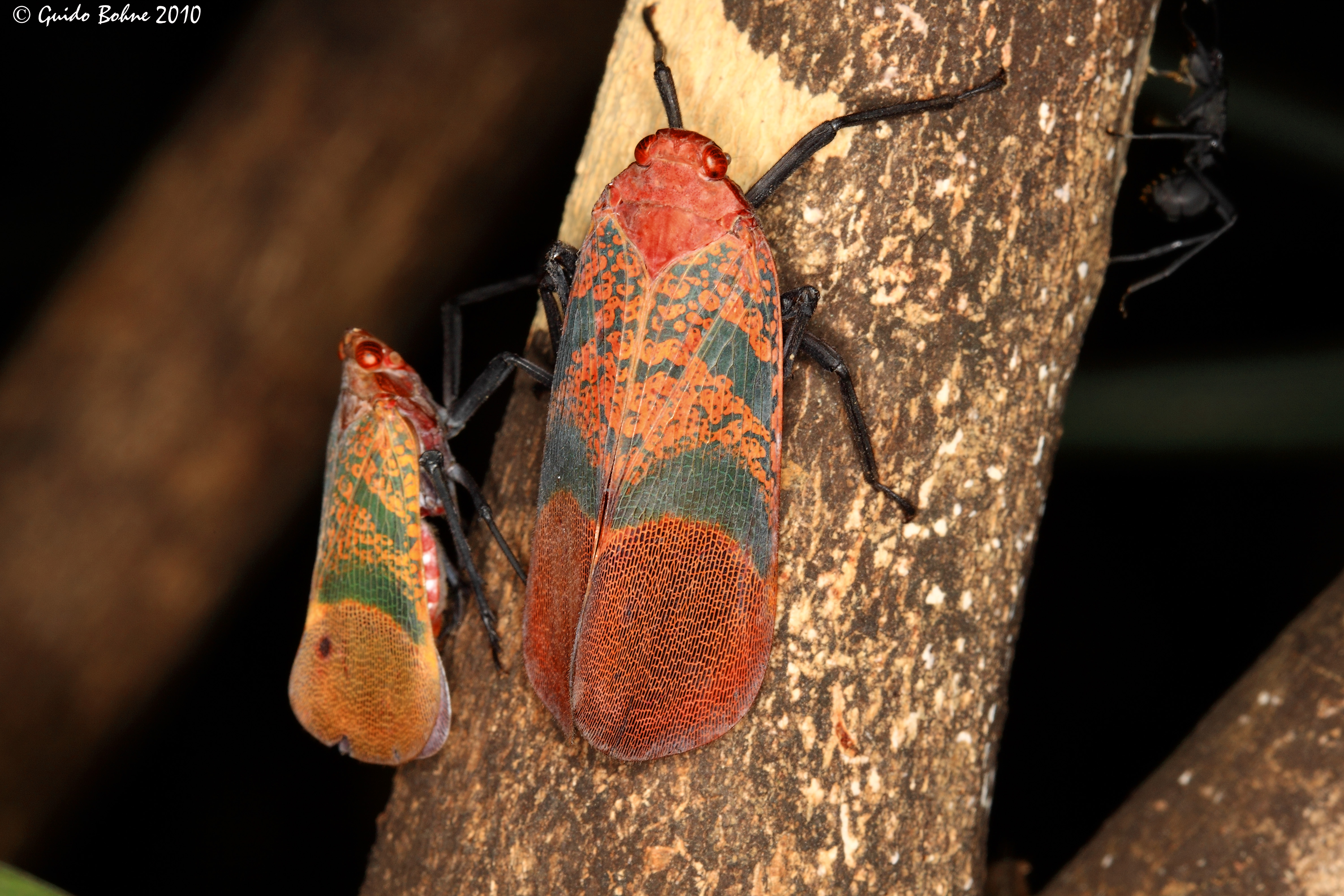
- Two Scamandra rosea in Java

Scientific classification
- Domain: Eukaryota
- Kingdom: Animalia
- Phylum: Arthropoda
- Class: Insecta
- Order: Hemiptera
- Suborder: Auchenorrhyncha
- Infraorder: Fulgoromorpha
- Family: Fulgoridae
- Genus: Scamandra
- Species: S. rosea

Binomial name
- Scamandra rosea (Guérin-Méneville, 1834)

Synonyms
- Scamandra fasciata; Scamandra basigera; Scamandra rosea varicolor; Scamandra rosea saturata; Scamandra moorei; Scamandra scriptifacies

= Scamandra rosea =

Species of lanternflies

Scamandra rosea is a species of lanternfly found in Sumatra, Java, Bali & Borneo.

== Identification ==
Scamandra rosea can be distinguished from all other Scamandra by the combination of no distinct blackish C-shaped marking at approximately 2/3rds from the base of the tegmina, with stripes formed by small dots in the basal 2/3rds. The only similar species of the three species of the lachesis group - Scamandra lachesis, S. lydia, and S. banksi, which are found in the Philippines, outside its range.
