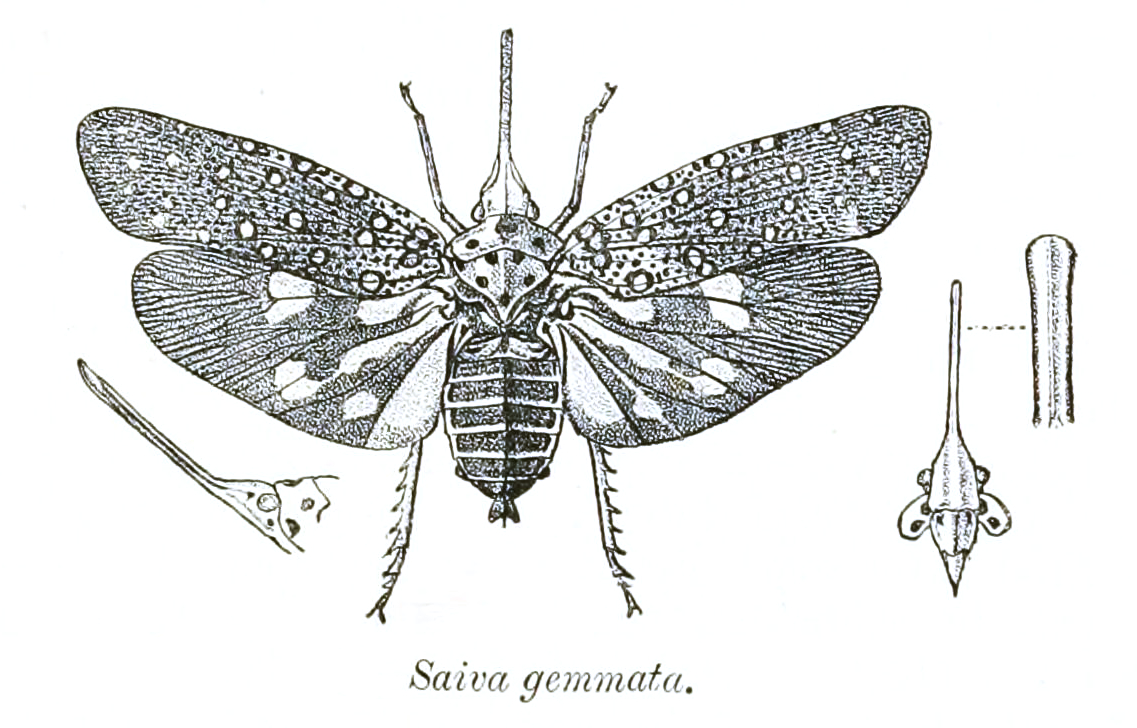

Scientific classification
- Domain: Eukaryota
- Kingdom: Animalia
- Phylum: Arthropoda
- Class: Insecta
- Order: Hemiptera
- Suborder: Auchenorrhyncha
- Infraorder: Fulgoromorpha
- Family: Fulgoridae
- Genus: Saiva
- Species: S. gemmata

Binomial name
- Saiva gemmata (Westwood, 1848)

Synonyms
- Fulgora gemmata Westwood, 1848; Fulgora monetaria Noualhier 1896

= Saiva gemmata =

Species of planthopper

Saiva gemmata is the type species of the genus Saiva, which are lantern bugs found from the North-East of India to Indo-China (Thailand and Vietnam). No subspecies are listed in the Catalogue of Life.
