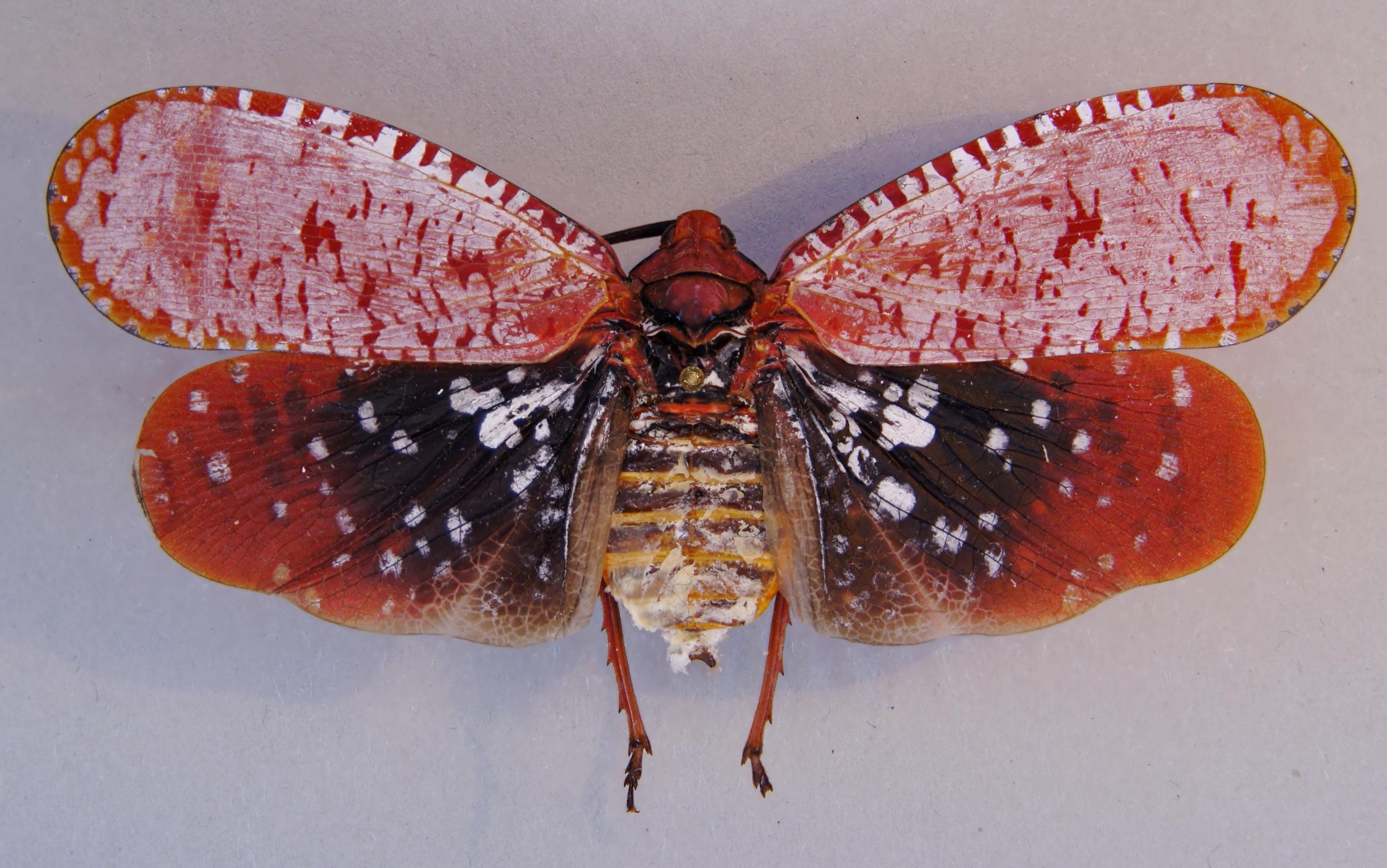
- Aphaena submaculata

Scientific classification
- Kingdom: Animalia
- Phylum: Arthropoda
- Clade: Pancrustacea
- Class: Insecta
- Order: Hemiptera
- Suborder: Auchenorrhyncha
- Infraorder: Fulgoromorpha
- Family: Fulgoridae
- Subfamily: Aphaeninae; Blanchard, 1847

Tribes
- See text

= Aphaeninae =

Subfamily of true bugs

The subfamily Aphaeninae is a group of hemipteran insects, especially abundant and diverse in the tropics, in the family Fulgoridae, or "lanternflies".

The future of the Aphaeninae as a subfamily is unclear since the taxa assigned to it do not form a monophyletic group in recent molecular analyses. The tribe Enchophorini, previously placed here, has been raised to a subfamily.

== Tribes and genera ==
Recent research has resulted in the reclassification of the former tribe Enchophorini to a separate subfamily (e.g.), while the tribe Pyropsini is now included here (e.g.,).

=== Aphaenini ===
Auth.: Blanchard, 1847 and Distant, 1906 (distribution: worldwide tropics)

- Anecphora Karsch, 1890 (equatorial Africa)
- Aphaena Guérin-Méneville, 1834 (type genus: Asia)
- Calmar Kirkaldy, 1901 (Gambia)
- Coelodictya Jacobi, 1910 (E. Africa)
- Copidocephala Stål, 1869 (Central Americas)
- Eddara Walker, 1858 (Sub-Saharan Africa)
- Egregia Chew Kea Foo, Porion & Audibert, 2010 (Malesia)
- Holodictya Gerstaecker, 1895 (Equatorial Africa)
- Hypselometopum Stål, 1853 (Sub-Saharan Africa)
- Kalidasa Kirkaldy, 1900 (India, Indo-China)
- Lycorma Stål, 1863 (Asia: incl. invasive sp.)
- Malfeytia Schmidt, 1905 (Congo basin)
- Metaphaena Schmidt, 1905 (Central Africa)
- Novodictya Lallemand, 1928 (Congo basin)
- Omalocephala Spinola, 1839 (Africa, S. India, Sri Lanka)
- Penthicodes Blanchard, 1845 (South-East Asia: esp. Indo-China & Malesia)
  - Species in the "artificial, heterogenous genus" Aphaenina Metcalf, 1947 are now synonyms of Penthicodes spp.
- Prolepta Walker, 1851 (Malesia)
- Scamandra Stål, 1863 (Malesia)
- Ulasia Stål, 1863 (PNG)

=== Benamatapini ===
Auth.: Lallemand, 1959 (central Africa)

1. Benamatapa Distant, 1899

=== Limoisini ===
Auth.: Lallemand, 1963 (East Asian mainland, New Guinea, Australia)

1. Bloeteanella Lallemand, 1959 (New Guinea)
2. Erilla Distant, 1906
3. Limois Stål, 1863 (Asia: esp. China) - type genus
4. Neolieftinckana Lallemand, 1963 (New Guinea)
5. Nisax Fennah, 1977
6. Ombro Fennah, 1977
7. Saramel Fennah, 1977 (New Guinea)

=== Pyropsini ===
Auth.: Haupt, 1929 (tropical Asia) (Synonym: Laternariini Distant, 1906 - unavailable, suppressed by ICZN ruling)

1. Datua Schmidt, 1911
2. Hariola Stål, 1863
3. Pyrops Spinola, 1839 (synonym Laternaria, the genus had been incertae sedis by some authorities)
4. Saiva Distant, 1906
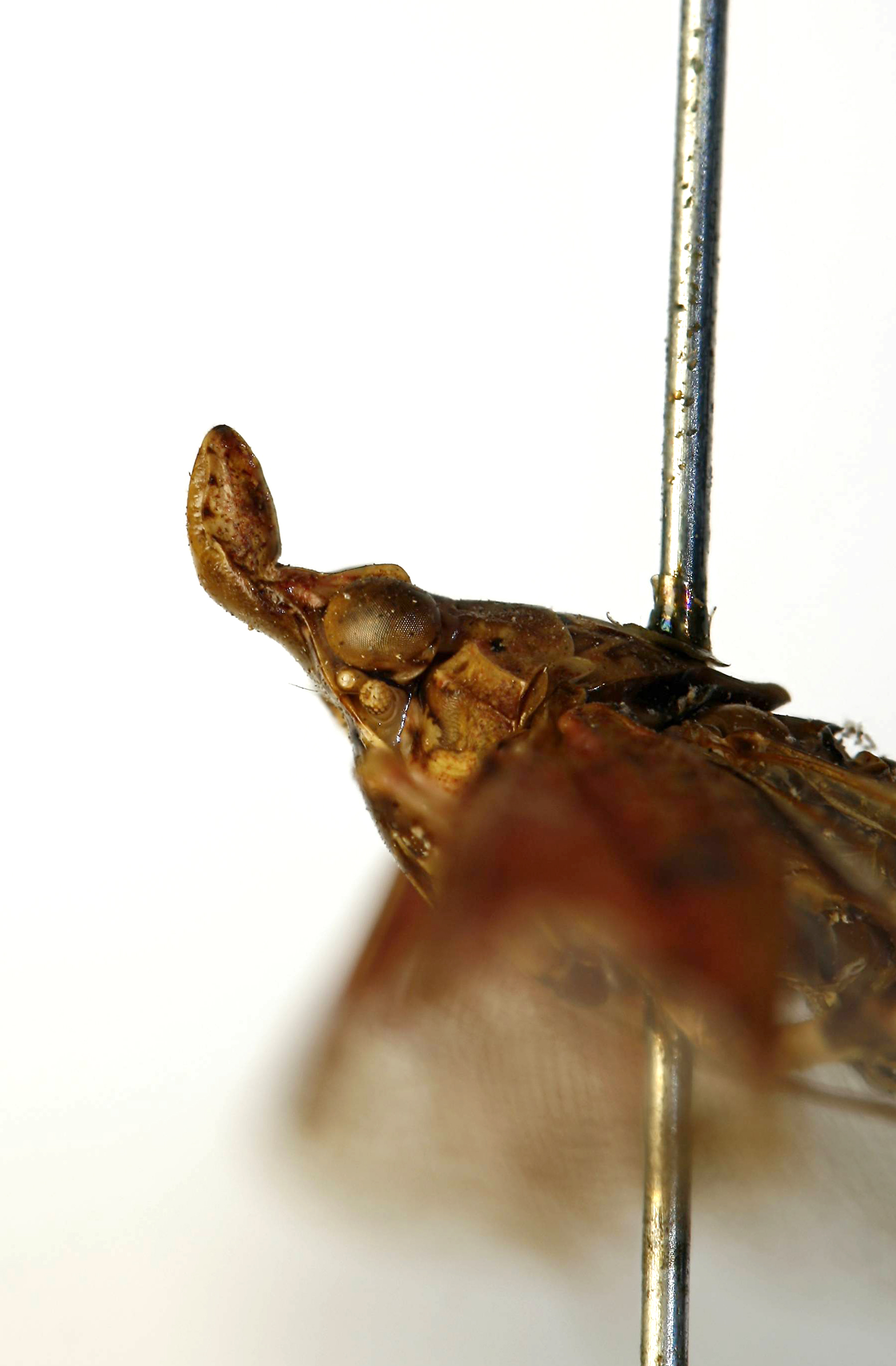
Hariola tiarata head lateral

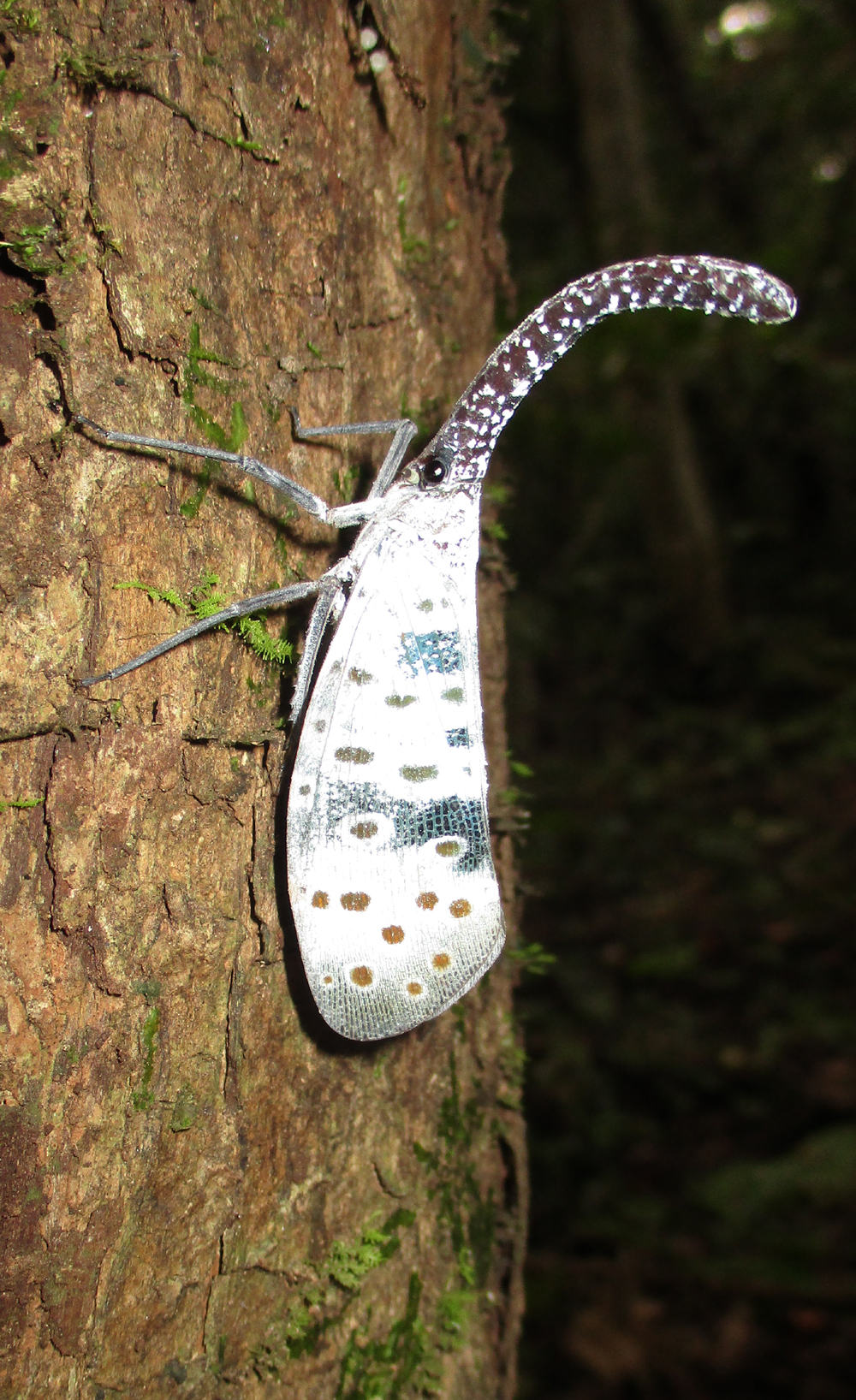
Pyrops coelestinus

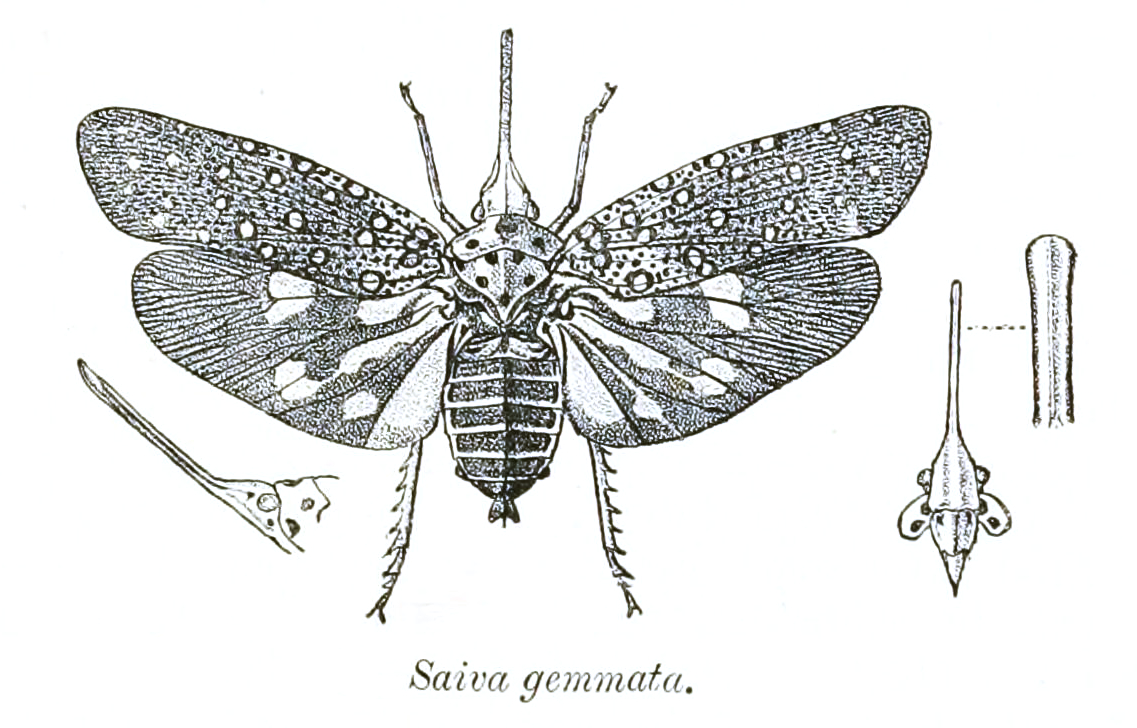
Saiva gemmata

=== Incertae sedis ===
1. Bhaskaraena Constant, 2016 (Malesia)
2. Birdantis Stål, 1863
3. Neoalcathous Wang & Huang, 1989 (China, Vietnam)

=== Genera formerly placed here ===
- Hellerides Lallemand, 1963 is a junior synonym of Zophiuma Fennah, 1955 in the Lophopidae.
- Flatolystra Nast, 1950 (South America) now incertae sedis

The following PNG/Australian genera were previously placed here, but are now in the Poiocerinae: tribe Poiocerini Haupt, 1929:

- Desudaba Walker, 1858 (formerly in the tribe Aphaenini Schmidt, 1912)
- Galela Distant, 1906 (formerly in the tribe Aphaenini Schmidt, 1912)
- The type species of genus Apossoda, A. togoensis Schmidt, 1911, is now placed in Pyrgoteles: P. togoensis (Schmidt, 1911)
