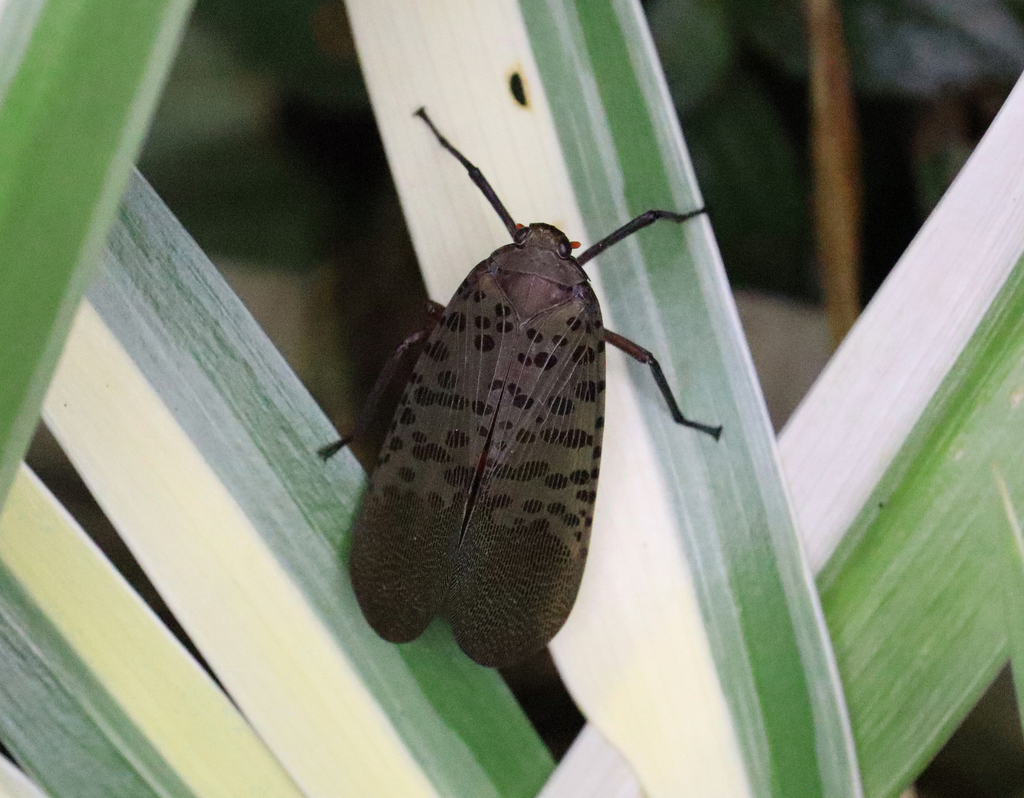

Scientific classification
- Kingdom: Animalia
- Phylum: Arthropoda
- Clade: Pancrustacea
- Class: Insecta
- Order: Hemiptera
- Suborder: Auchenorrhyncha
- Infraorder: Fulgoromorpha
- Family: Fulgoridae
- Genus: Lycorma
- Species: L. imperialis

Binomial name
- Lycorma imperialis (White, 1846)

Synonyms
- Aphana imperialis White, 1846; Aphaena imperialis; Aphaena placabilis Walker, 1858; Aphana placabilis; Lycorma imperialis placabilis; Lycorma imperialis var. placabilis

= Lycorma imperialis =

Species of insect

Lycorma imperialis is a planthopper indigenous to parts of China and Indo-Malaysia. Originally discovered in 1846 by Adam White, L. imperialis has undergone a number of reclassifications since its discovery and is one of four species in the genus Lycorma. L. imperialis follows a hemimetabolous life cycle and will undergo a series of nymphal stages (instars) before maturing to an adult.

Lycorma imperialis is referred to as a "lanternfly" or "lantern bug" due to its crimson hindwings and its forewings, which can range from blue green to brick red. It does not, however, emit light. L. imperialis can cause substantial damage to agricultural industries due to its specialized, sap sucking mouthparts and the resulting mold that develops from its honeydew excrement.

== Taxonomy ==
Lycorma imperialis is a species in the genus Lycorma, in the planthopper family Fulgoridae, subfamily Aphaeninae. Species within this genus are found in Asia. L. imperialis was originally described by Adam White in 1846, and was classified as Aphana imperialis. The entomologist John O. Westwood reclassified the species as Aphaena imperialis in 1848, and Francis Walker described the species again in 1858 under the name Aphaena placabilis, a junior synonym. Following the establishment of the genus Lycorma in 1863, the species was reclassified once more by Carl Stål to Lycorma imperialis.

Lycorma imperialis had two former subspecies that are no longer recognized. L. i. placabilis was initially classified as a subspecies of L. imperialis, but this classification was removed in 1996. Lycorma punicea (originally described as Lystra punicea by Frederick William Hope, 1843) was initially classified as a subspecies but was reclassified as a separate species. Taxonomic classification places three other species (L. delicatula, L. meliae, and L. punicea) as closely related to L. imperialis.

== Description ==
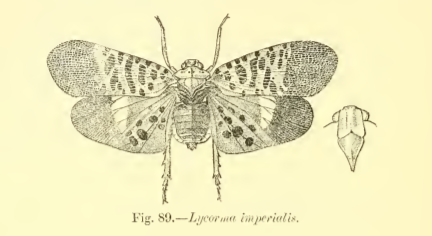
Distant's 1906 diagram and description of L. imperialis

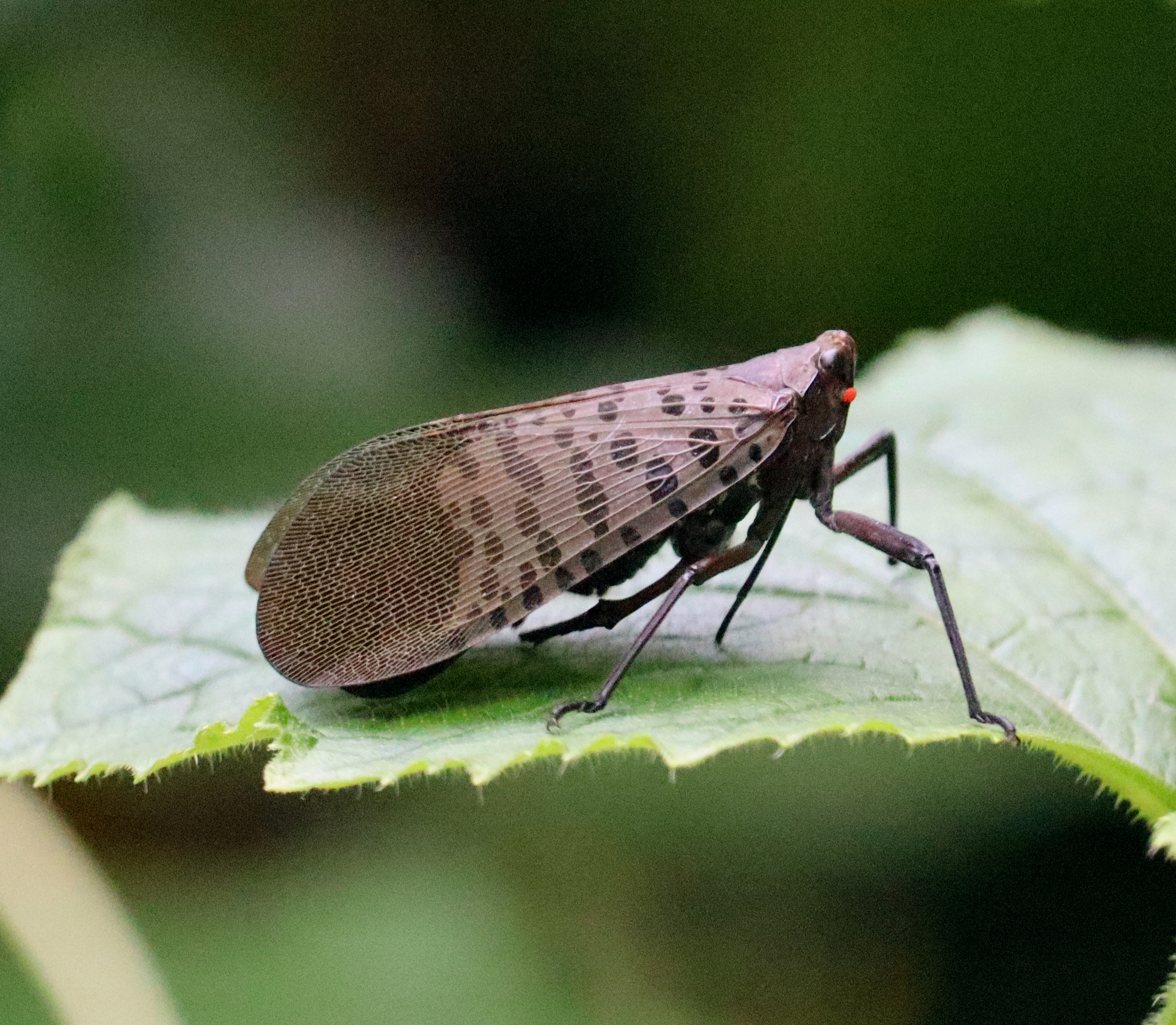
In India

Adult L. imperialis measure between 16 millimetres (0.63 in) to 21 millimetres (0.83 in) in length. Distant described the general morphology of L. imperialis as similar to the subfamily Aphaeninae, with similarities in the proboscis, upward facing, narrow face, a ridge-like prothorax, and overall wing structure. The head and thorax range from a light brownish yellow to an olive color. L. imperialis' abdomen is yellowish on the lateral sides with black and white bands separating the abdominal segments present on the top and bottom. The basal two thirds of the forewings are a bluish-green and covered in approximately 25 rounded black spots. The apical third of the forewings is translucent with bright bluish-green color and lacks black spots. The sternum, legs, and rostrum are a chestnut color. The hindwings of L. imperialis range from a crimson color with 8 spots to a purple color with blue bands. The tips of the forewings are black. When the forewings are spread, L. imperialis measures up to 2.5 inches. The orange antennae attach below the eyes and are bulbous with thick bristles covering the outer segments. L. imperialis, along with some related planthoppers, is colloquially referred to as "lanternfly" or "lantern bug", as some of the related genera (e.g., Pyrops) have unusual heads with brightly colored tips that were once thought to emit light. However, no planthoppers emit light.

== Life cycle and behavior ==
Lanternflies follow a hemimetabolous life cycle. This means that L. imperialis experiences a series of incomplete metamorphoses that gradually change the body's structure over successive molts. L. imperialis does not experience a pupal stage. L. imperialis will lay its eggs clusters coated in a waxy cuticle, during the late fall to early winter seasons. These eggs will develop until late spring when L. imperialis nymphs emerge. The first instar of the lanternfly will lack wings and instead rely on hopping from leaf to leaf in search of food. L. imperialis, similar to other Fulgoridae planthoppers, will undergo a total of four instars before maturing to adults in mid summer. Adult L. imperialis, despite having wings, will still prefer to hop and crawl over flying. They will generally only fly in the event of food scarcity or in search of a mate. Lantern bugs generally have a lifespan of one year and do not survive winter.

Adult L. imperialis have specialized mouthparts that pierce and suck sap from the stems and foliage of plants. These lanternflies have been observed performing group feeding, en masse on trees. Lanternflies will cause significant damage to crops both through feeding but also indirectly through the honeydew they excrete. This honeydew is made up primarily of undigested plant sap and can often promote mold growth. This will typically present itself as a ring of black mold surrounding an infested plant, and is referred to as "sooty mold".

== Distribution and ecology ==
Lycorma imperialis is native to Southern China, India, and Bangladesh. L. imperialis is the only species in the Lycorma genus that is confirmed to be native to India, specifically the Assam, Darjiling, and Sikkim areas. Lycorma imperialis, along with the rest of the genus Lycorma, are parasitized by the eupelmid wasp Anastatus orientalis and by Dryinus sinicus, a dryinid wasp.
