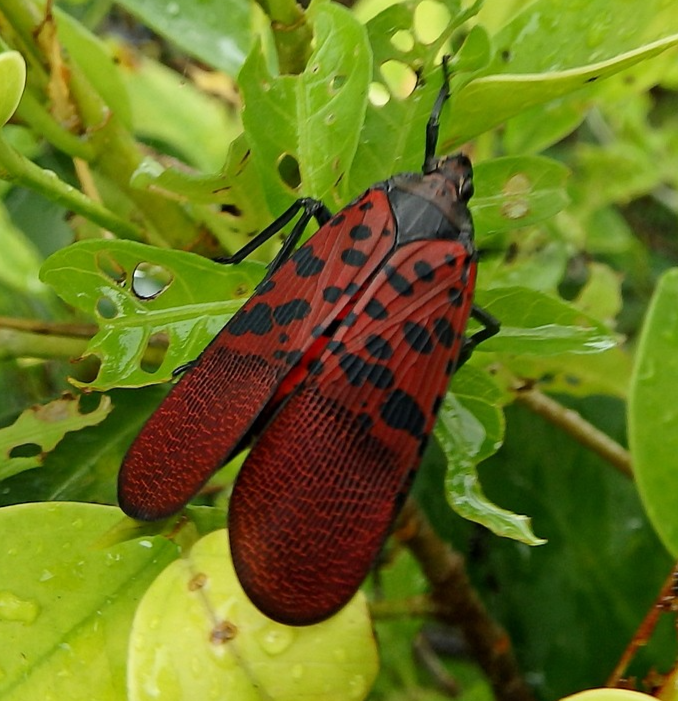
- Adult, red morph of L. meliae
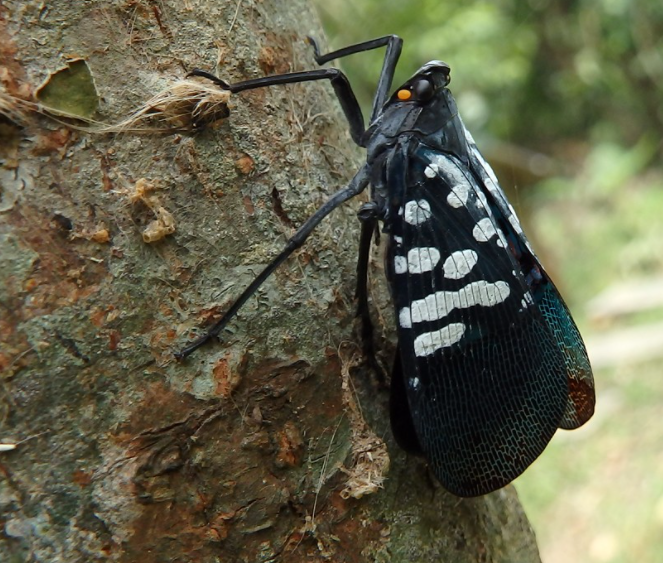
- Adult, dark blue morph of L. meliae, formerly classified as Lycorma olivacea.

Scientific classification
- Kingdom: Animalia
- Phylum: Arthropoda
- Clade: Pancrustacea
- Class: Insecta
- Order: Hemiptera
- Suborder: Auchenorrhyncha
- Infraorder: Fulgoromorpha
- Family: Fulgoridae
- Genus: Lycorma
- Species: L. meliae

Binomial name
- Lycorma meliae Kato, 1929

Synonyms
- Lycorma olivacea Kato, 1929

= Lycorma meliae =

Species of insect

Lycorma meliae is a planthopper species endemic to Taiwan, with multiple, dramatically different color morphs depending on the life stage. The species was described by Masayo Kato in Taiwan in 1929, and is the only member of its genus confirmed to be native to the island. In 1929, a specimen of L. meliae was originally described as a separate species, L. olivacea, also by Kato. These two taxon names were declared synonymous in 2023. L. meliae undergoes four instar stages before achieving adulthood and generally only survive until the winter.

== Taxonomy ==
L. meliae is a species in the genus Lycorma, in the planthopper family Fulgoridae, subfamily Aphaeninae. Species within this genus are found in Asia. L. meliae, along with its synonym L. olivacea, was described by Masayo Kato in Taiwan in 1929. While initially seen as two separate species, a 2023 report in the Zoological Studies journal concluded that L. meliae and L. olivacea represented two different life stages of the same species. In this reclassification, L. olivacea was redefined as a junior synonym.

== Description ==
Males have a body length that ranges from 22.2 millimetres (0.87 in) to 28.5 millimetres (1.12 in). Females are larger, with a body length ranging from 26.5 millimetres (1.04 in) and 32.2 millimetres (1.27 in). Male forewing (tegmen) length ranges from 18.9 millimetres (0.74 in) to 25 millimetres (0.98 in); female forewing length ranges from 23.2 millimetres (0.91 in) to 27.8 millimetres (1.09 in).

The head is short, broad, and angled upward; it ranges from a brown to black. The back of the head is marked with two dark brown projections, both of which have a ridge running down the back. There are two longitudinal ridges also running down each side of these. The clypeus is broad and the labium (a part of the mouth) is long but does not reach the abdomen. The antennae are both a marigold orange-yellow. The prothorax and mesonotum are both black, as is the abdomen. The margins of the abdominal tergites are sometimes a marigold orange-yellow. The basal 3/5ths of the forewings range from a bright red to blue. These sections are covered in black and brown spots that vary in size, and sometimes have a white powdery appearance. The rest is covered in a reticulate pattern of veins. The hindwings vary from pink to light blue, often featuring brown spots. The basal third of the hindwings are brown. The legs are generally dark brown to black. Throughout maturation, the forewings undergo a series of color changes. They begin as bright red with black spots, then transition to reddish brown, brown, deep green, and ending at a dark blue, while the spots gradually transition from black to white.

The male genitalia are formed by the 9th, 10th, and 11th abdominal segments. On the 9th segment, the anterior margin is concave and the margins have a series of small projections. The 10th segment is moderately convex, and the apical section is broader than the basal section. This forms a V shape from the side view and a U shape from the top view. The 11th segment is made up of a sternite that is approximately twice the size of the tergite. This segment is an oval shape with hooks on the lateral margins. When mating, the lobes can expand to five times their sheathed length, folding backwards and downwards.

L. meliae is similar in appearance to and has sometimes been mistaken for Lycorma delicatula, but they can be differentiated based upon coloration and eye structure.

== Life cycle and ecology ==
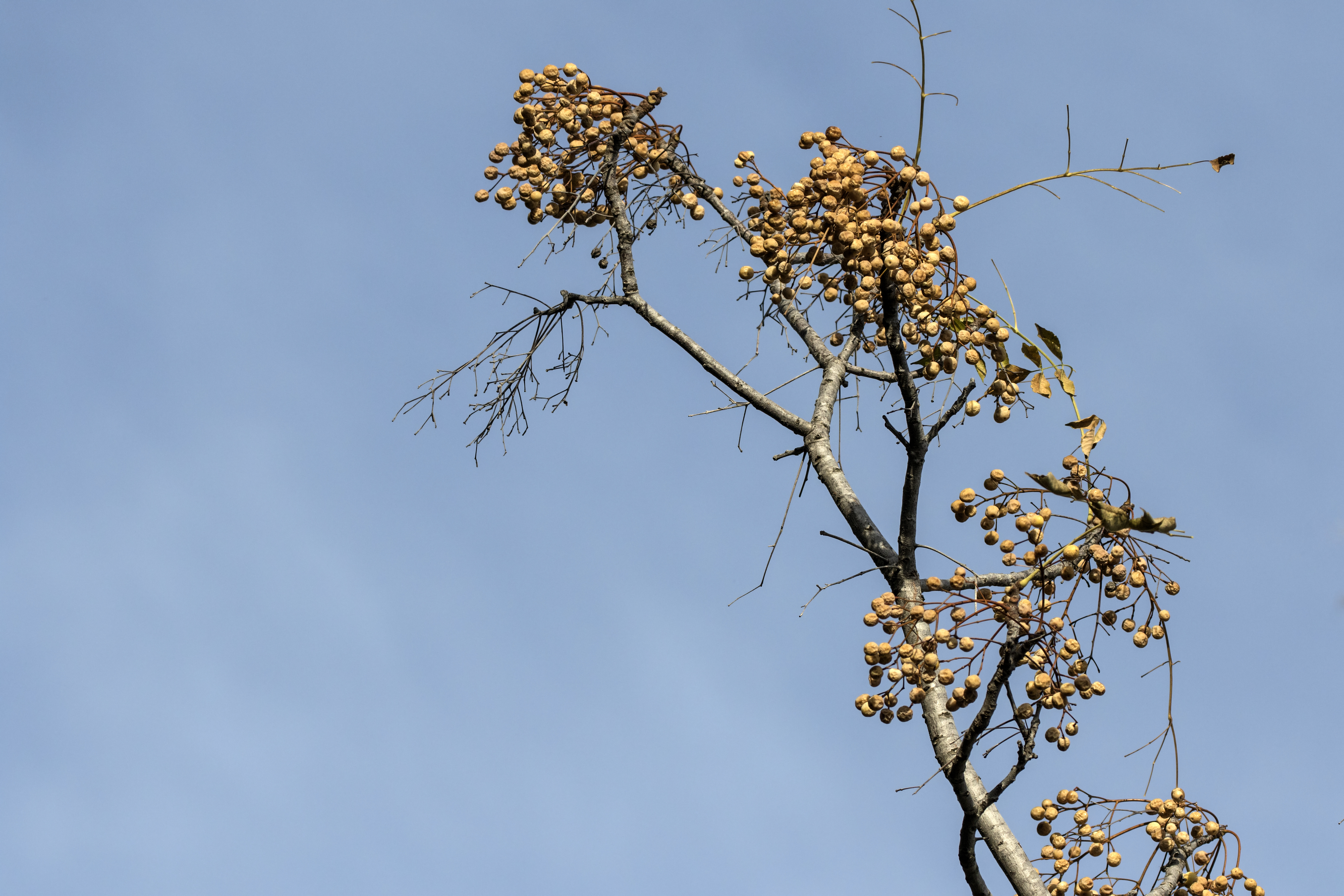
Melia azedarach, the host plant of L. meliae

L. meliae is hemimetabolous, meaning that it has nymphal stages before becoming an adult, rather than larval and pupal stages. L. meliae lays its egg clusters, coated in a waxy layer, during the late fall to early winter seasons. The eggs develop until late spring when L. meliae nymphs emerge. In total, L. meliae nymphs pass through four instar stages before achieving adulthood.

The chinaberry tree Melia azedarach is a known host for L. meliae. Lycorma meliae, along with the rest of the genus Lycorma, are parasitized by the eupelmid wasp Anastatus orientalis and by Dryinus sinicus, a dryinid wasp.

== Distribution and evolution ==
Lycorma meliae is endemic to the island of Taiwan. The following cladogram shows the phylogenetic position of L. meliae among select members of the tribe Aphaenini, based upon comparison of mitochondrial DNA:

- Aphaenini
  - other species
  - - - - Lycorma meliae
        - L. delicatula
      - - - A. amabilis
          - A. discolor
