= Lysithea =

Lysithea can refer to a few different things:

- Lysithea (alga), a genus of red algae in the family Bangiaceae
- Lysithea (moon), a moon of Jupiter
- Lysithea (mythology), a figure in Greek mythology
- Lysithea, a fictional spacecraft carrier in Voices of a Distant Star
- Lysithea von Ordelia, a fictional character from the video game Fire Emblem: Three Houses

== See also ==
- Cosmopterix lysithea, a species of moth
