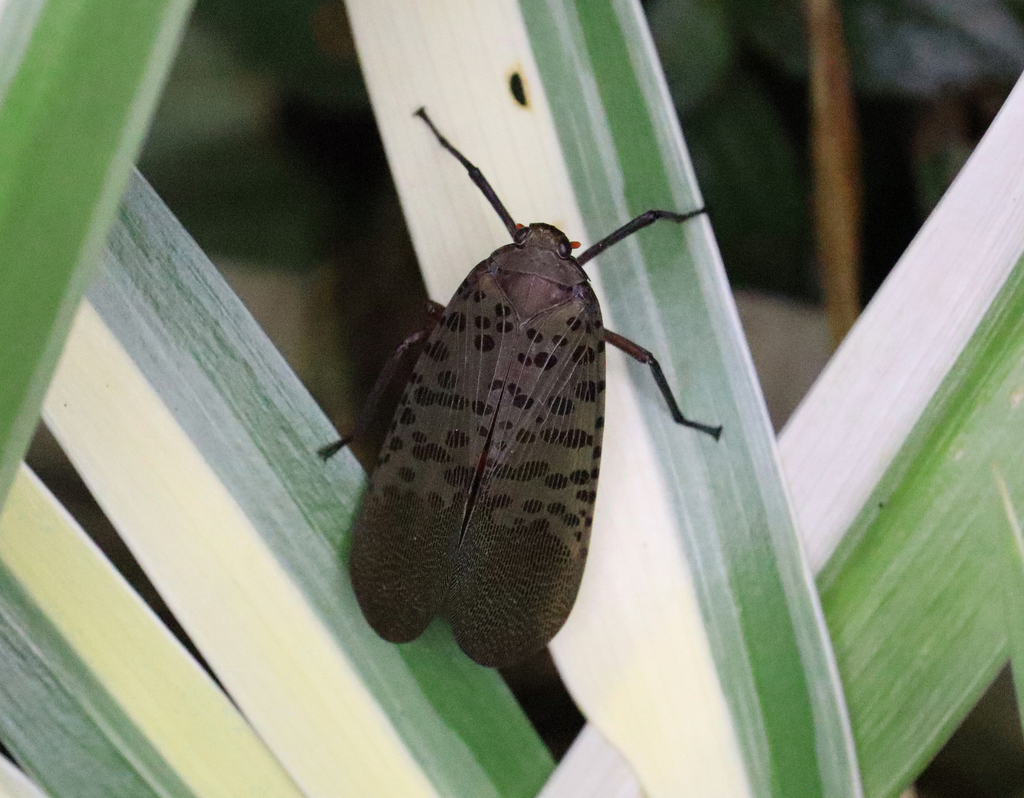
- Lycorma imperialis (type species)

Scientific classification
- Kingdom: Animalia
- Phylum: Arthropoda
- Clade: Pancrustacea
- Class: Insecta
- Order: Hemiptera
- Suborder: Auchenorrhyncha
- Infraorder: Fulgoromorpha
- Family: Fulgoridae
- Subfamily: Aphaeninae
- Tribe: Aphaenini
- Genus: Lycorma; Stål, 1863

Type species
- Lycorma imperialis White, 1846

= Lycorma =

Genus of planthoppers

Lycorma is a genus of planthoppers native to Asia. The first species within the genus was described by Frederick William Hope in 1843 and the genus was formally established by Carl Stål in 1863.

== Discovery and taxonomy ==
The genus Lycorma is in the planthopper family Fulgoridae, subfamily Aphaeninae. Species within this genus are native to Asia. Frederick William Hope, in 1843, described Lystra punicea, the first named species of the clade. In 1845, Adam White classified two new species under the genus Aphaena, Aphaena imperialis and Aphaena delicatula. White described the species as similar to Aphaena variegata, another planthopper species native to Asia, and referenced prior descriptions by George Tradescant Lay in his initial classification of the lanternflies.

Between 1846 and 1863, the species were reclassified by both John O. Westwood and Francis Walker. In 1863, the genus Lycorma was formally established by Carl Stål, with Lycorma imperialis subsequently designated as the type species. In 1929, Masayo Kato described two additional Lycorma species in Taiwan: L. meliae and L. olivacea, but L. olivacea was later reclassified as a color form of L. meliae. Additional reclassifications occurred through the work of Edwin Felix Thomas Atkinson, William Lucas Distant, Robert L. Metcalf, and others, including the synonymization of all former subspecies in 1996, so that only four species are now recognized by most authorities, and no subspecies.

The name Lycorma derives from the Lycormas river in Aetolia (Greek: Λυκόρμας - now the Evinos river: Εύηνος); in Greek mythology, Evenus drowned himself in the river Lycormas after being humiliated by his daughter Marpessa's abduction at the hands of Idas. Members of this genus are often referred to colloquially as "lanternfly" or "lantern bug" due to their brightly colored hind wings. L. delicatula (often called the spotted lanternfly) has received a number of different colloquial names because it is invasive in South Korea, the United States, and Japan.

=== Species ===
Image	Species	Synonyms
	Lycorma delicatula (White, 1845)	Lycorma jole, Lycorma operosa
	Lycorma imperialis (White, 1845)	Lycorma placabilis
	Lycorma punicea (Hope 1843)	Lycorma delectabilis
	Lycorma meliae Kato, 1929	Lycorma olivacea Kato, 1929

== Distribution and evolution ==
=== Native range ===
The genus Lycorma has species distributed across South and Southeast Asia. Surveys in the 1930s found that L. delicatula is native to China's northern provinces of Shanxi, Shandong and Hebei, and has been used in traditional Chinese medicine since the 1100s. As of 2020, it has expanded its range to include Anhui, Beijing, Guangdong, Henan, Jiangsu, Sichuan, Yunnan and Zhejiang. L. delicatula has also been reported in Taiwan, Vietnam, and India, but ongoing research has yet to conclude if the species is native to these regions. L. imperialis is native to China, Bangladesh, and India, specifically the Assam and Sikkim regions. Lycorma punicea is known from Bangladesh and India (Assam, and Darjeeling), while L. meliae is native solely to Taiwan.

==== Phylogeny ====
The following cladogram shows the phylogenetic position of Lycorma among select genera of the Fulgoridae family:

- Fulgoridae
  - - Pyrops
    - - Aphaena
      - - Lycorma

=== Accidental introduction ===
In 2006, L. delicatula was discovered to have invasively spread to South Korea. In 2009, L. delicatula was discovered in Japan, and in 2014, the species was discovered in the United States. L. delicatula may have previously entered Japan sporadically since the 1930s, but only achieved a stable population in the early 2000s. It is believed that L. delicatula entered these countries via egg masses that were laid on exported goods. Currently, these countries have implemented pest control efforts which have sought to limit population growth and spread, due to the threat L. delicatula poses to global agricultural industries.
