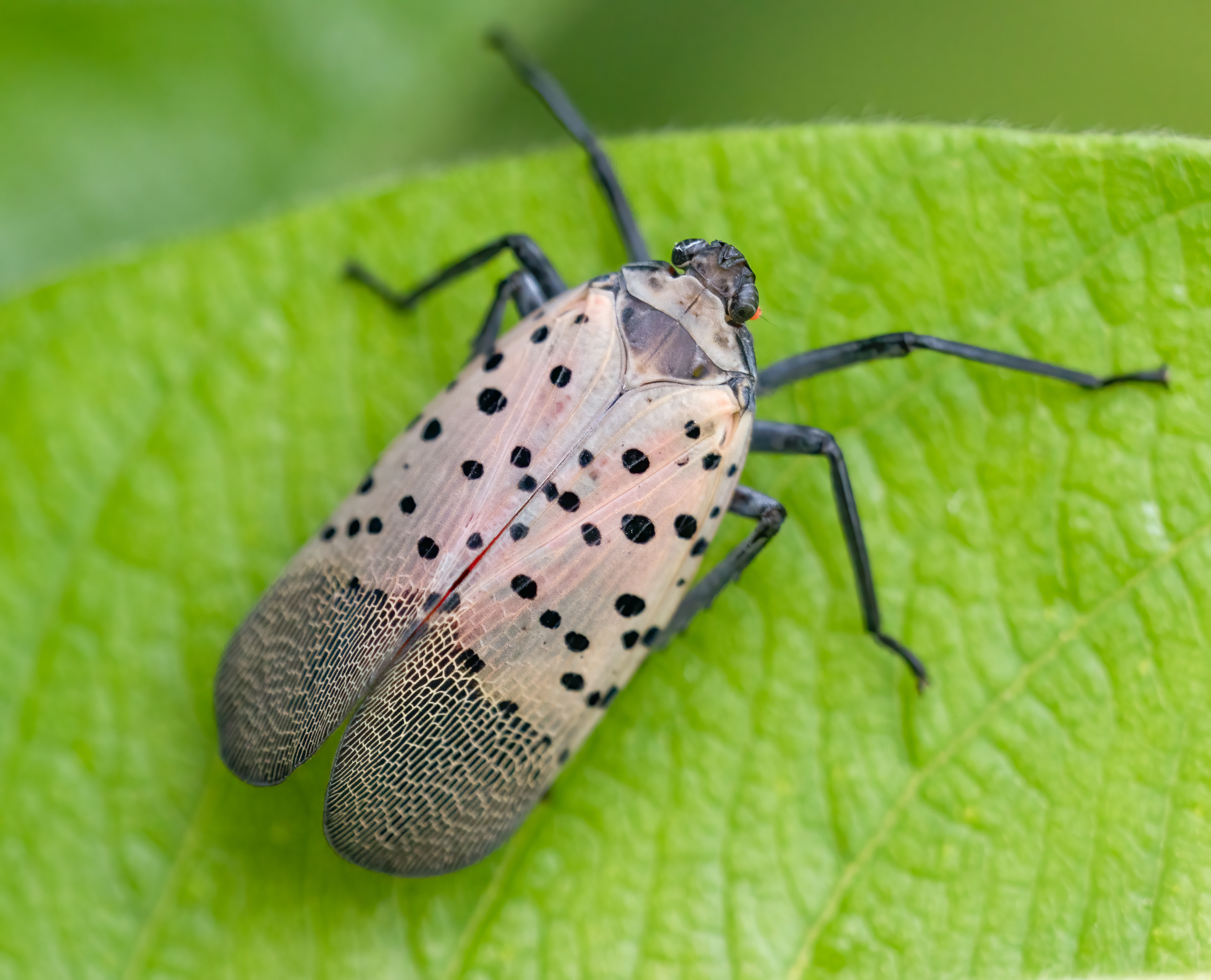
- At Brooklyn Botanic Garden, New York
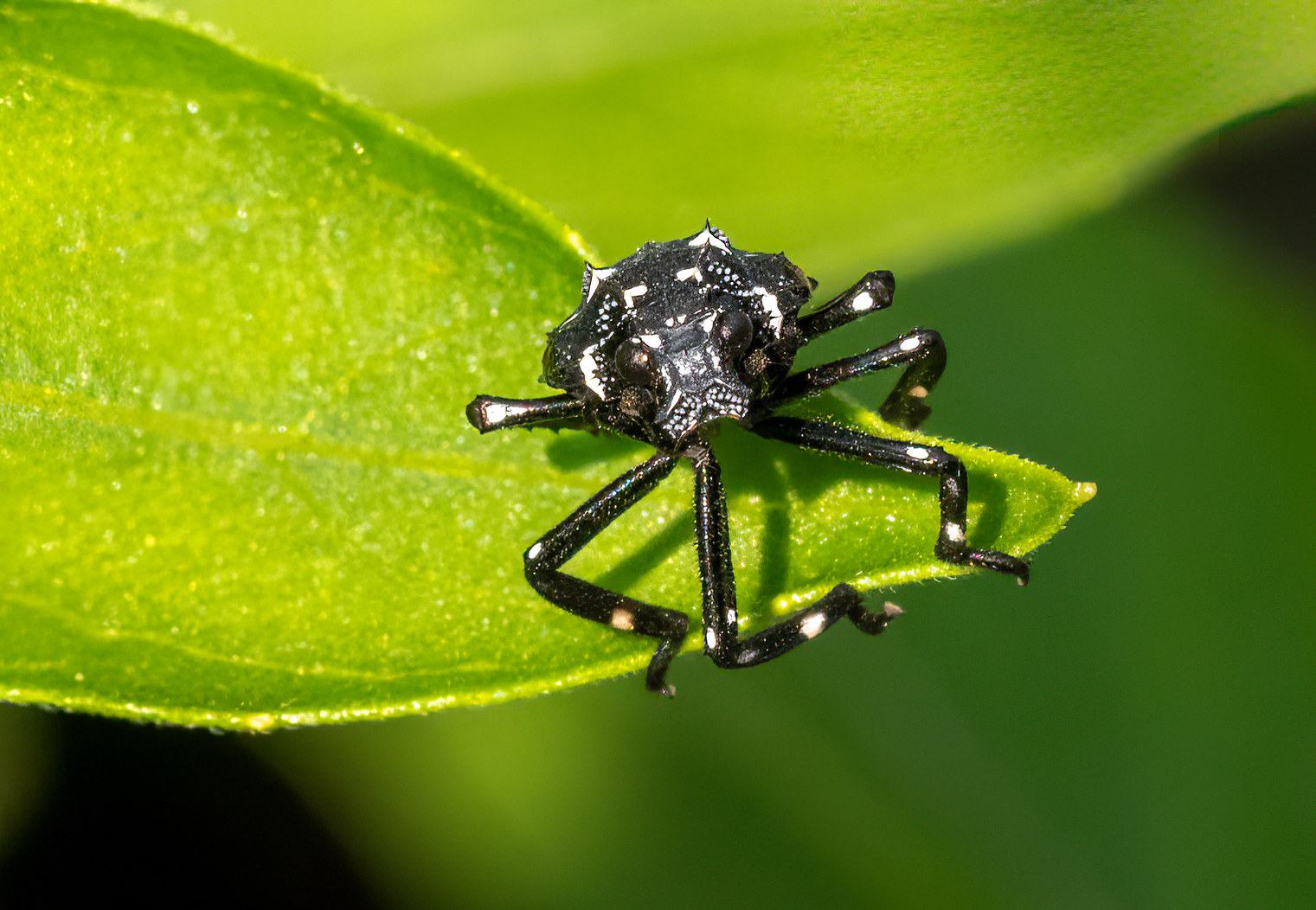
- Nymph

Scientific classification
- Kingdom: Animalia
- Phylum: Arthropoda
- Clade: Pancrustacea
- Class: Insecta
- Order: Hemiptera
- Suborder: Auchenorrhyncha
- Infraorder: Fulgoromorpha
- Family: Fulgoridae
- Genus: Lycorma
- Species: L. delicatula

Binomial name
- Lycorma delicatula (White, 1845)

Subspecies
- L. d. delicatula (White, 1845); L. d. jole Stal, 1863; L. d. operosa (Walker 1858)

Synonyms
- Aphaena delicatula White, 1845

= Spotted lanternfly =

Species of planthopper indigenous to Southeast Asia

The spotted lanternfly (Lycorma delicatula) is a species of planthopper indigenous to parts of China and Vietnam. It was accidentally introduced into South Korea and has spread invasively to Japan, 21 U.S. states, and Windsor, Ontario in Canada, (where it is often referred to by the acronym "SLF") and parts of Eastern Europe including Moldova. Its preferred host is the also invasive tree of heaven (Ailanthus altissima), but it also feeds on other trees, and on crops including soybean, grapes, stone fruits, and the Malus (apple) genus. In its native habitat, L. delicatula populations are regulated by parasitic wasps.

The spotted lanternfly's life cycle is often centered on its preferred host, Ailanthus altissima, but L. delicatula can associate with more than 173 plants. Early life stages (instars) of the spotted lanternfly are characterized by spotted black and white nymphs that develop a red pigmentation and wings as they mature. Early life instars have a large host range that narrows with maturation. Adult spotted lanternflies have a black head, grey fore wings, and red hind wings. Adults do not have any specialized feeding associations with herbaceous plants but cause extensive damage to crops and ornamental plants. The piercing wounds caused by their mouthparts and the honeydew waste they excrete are harmful to the health of host plants. They feed on the sap of host plants, including the tree of heaven, which is also invasive in the United States. The spotted lanternfly does not pose direct danger to humans through biting or stinging. Spotted lanternflies lay egg masses containing 30–50 eggs, often covered with a grayish mud-like coating.

The species was introduced into South Korea in 2006 and Japan in 2009, where it has since been considered a pest. In September 2014, L. delicatula was first recorded in the United States, and as of 2022, it is considered an invasive species in much of the Northeastern United States, rapidly spreading south and west. L. delicatula's egg masses are the primary vector of spread, with Ailanthus altissima populations seen as a risk factor for further infestation globally. Ongoing pest control efforts have sought to limit population growth, due to the threat L. delicatula poses to global agricultural industries. Parts of the United States have undergone massive pest control efforts to cull the spotted lanternfly's population. However, this process indirectly harms other species.

== Taxonomy and discovery ==
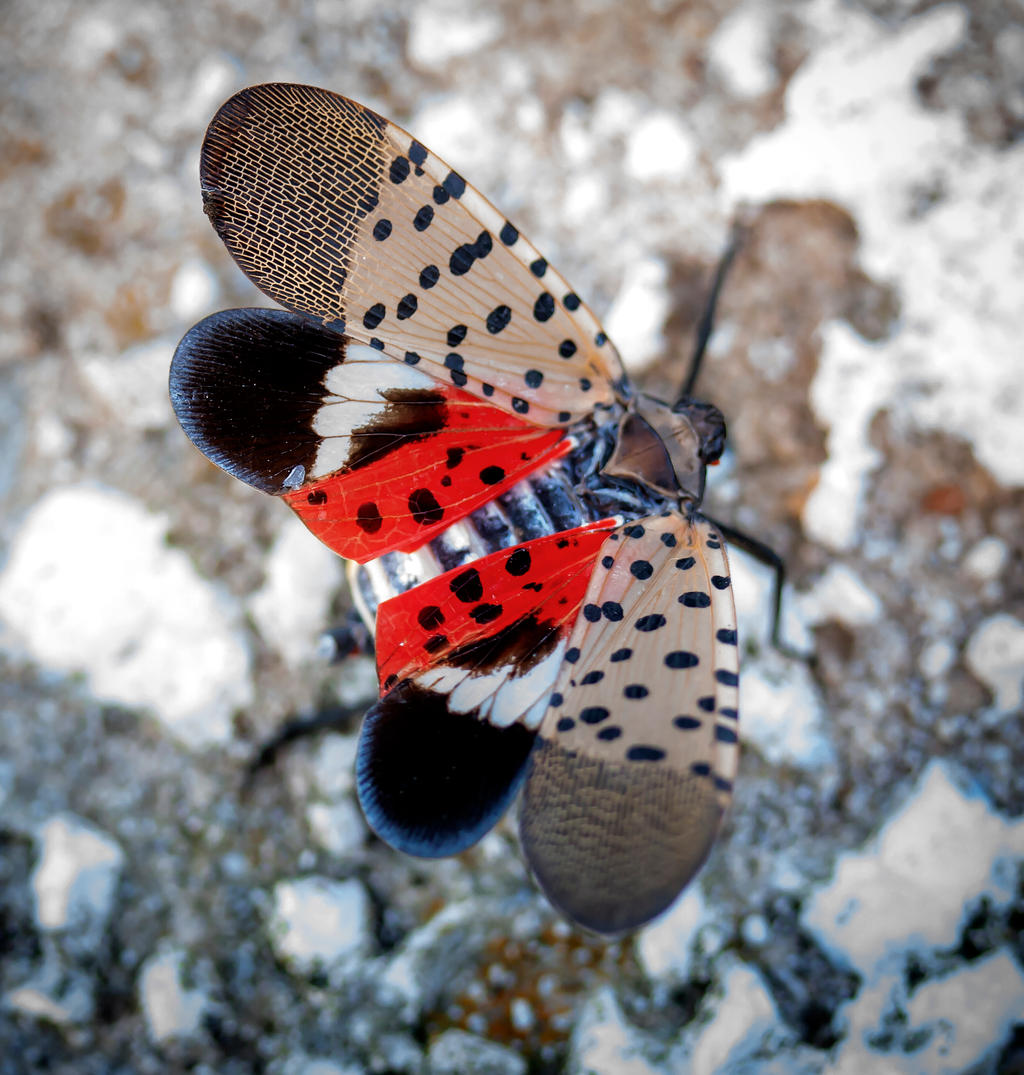
Spotted lanternfly showing underwing

Lycorma delicatula is a species in the genus Lycorma, in the planthopper family Fulgoridae, subfamily Aphaeninae. Species within this genus are found in Asia. Taxonomic classification places three other species (L. imperialis (White, 1846), L. meliae Kato, 1929, and L. punicea (Hope, 1843) as closely related to the spotted lanternfly.

L. delicatula was originally described by Adam White in 1845 as Aphaena delicatula, and the first scientific collections were made outside of Nanking, China. The etymology of the species name is not explained, but would fit with a diminutive Latin adjective in nominative singular feminine delicatula which could allude to its delicate appearance, although it has been claimed as meaning "luxurious". White described the species as similar to Aphaena variegata, another planthopper native to Asia, and referenced a prior description by the collector George Tradescant Lay in his initial classification of the spotted lanternfly.

In 1863, the species was reclassified as Lycorma delicatula by Carl Stål when that genus was first defined. In the same work, he also newly described Lycorma jole Stål, 1863 from "India Orientalis", noting differential aspects such as green-olivaceous forewings and being slightly larger (as translated in Distant, 1906). Another, originally Aphaena operosa Walker, 1858 from "North China" had been described several years earlier, for example reddish-brown "testaceous" or "lurid" forewings but had already been revised as a junior synonym in an earlier work by Stål, 1862.

However, some works treat these other historical descriptions as additional subspecies, namely: Lycorma delicatula jole Stål, 1863, and Lycorma delicatula operosa (Walker, 1858). In 2019, the genome of L. delicatula was fully sequenced, with Aphaena amabilis, and Pyrops candelaria both being classified as close relatives. This series of studies together help characterise the genetic diversity in South east Asian lineages, and the possible origins of introductions beyond the native range. However, none of these latter studies indicate substantial divergences of native populations that would warrant recognition of subspecies.

== Description ==
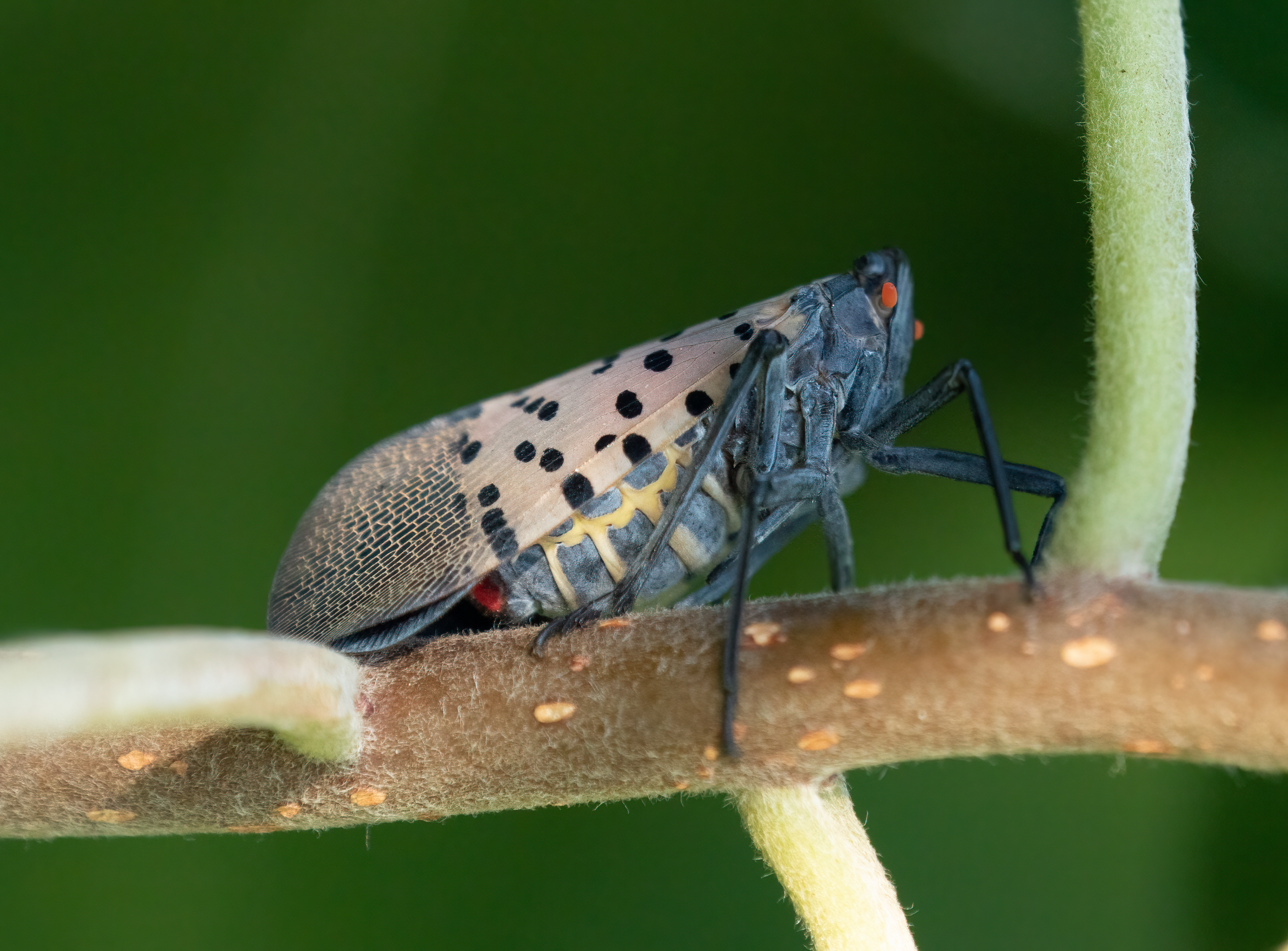
Spotted lanternfly in New York, where it is an invasive species

Adult L. delicatula measure about 25 millimetres (1 in) long and 12 millimetres (1/2 in) wide. Adult lanternflies have a black head and gray-brown forewings adorned with black spots. White's original account identified L. delicatula as having a minimum of 20 black spots, with six spots located on the anterior margin of the forewings.

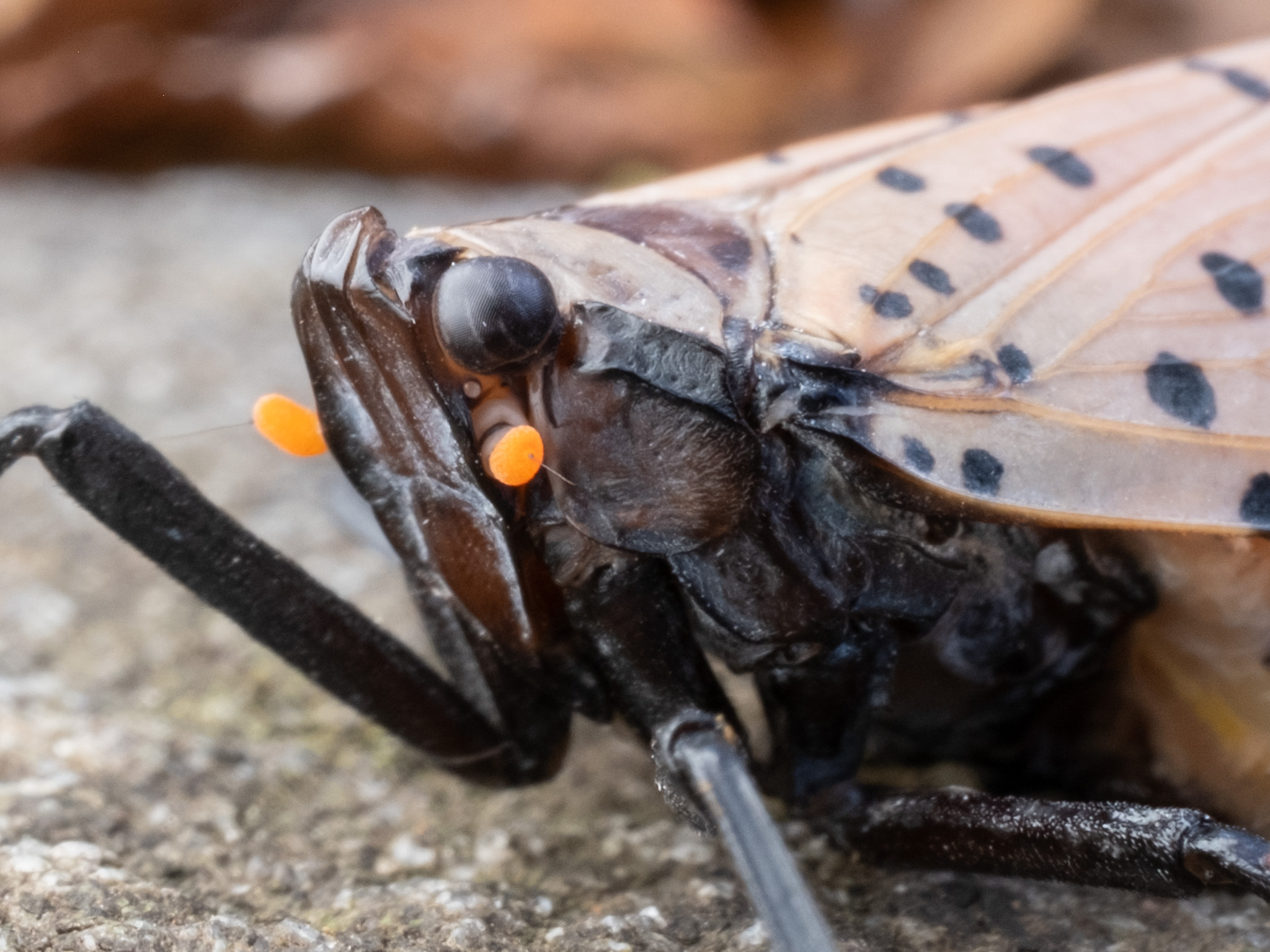
Close-up of the head of an adult

When resting, the crimson hind wings are partially visible through the semi-translucent forewings, giving the lanternfly a red cast. Neatly spaced black rectangular markings color the tips of the forewings in a pattern sometimes likened to brick and mortar. In flight, the spotted lanternfly displays red hind wings with black spots on the proximal third, a white wedge in the middle of the wing, and a solid black wing tip. The abdomen is yellowish with black and white bands on the top and bottom. L. delicatula displays orange, bulbous antennae covered in needle-like tips.

The spotted lanternfly is sexually dimorphic. Females have a set of red valvifers at the distal end of the abdomen, which males lack. When gravid (mated), the females' abdomens swell to the point where they have difficulty moving. Adult females, when measured from head to wing tip, have a body length of 20 to 27 millimetres (13/16 to 1 1/16 in) while males are a smaller size, between 21 and 22 millimetres (53/64 and 55/64 in). Females also have longer legs than males.

The lanternfly is a planthopper, and uses its wings to assist these jumps rather than making sustained flights. The spotted lanternfly will perform a number of "successive collisions" upon jumping, employing both passive and active righting as it falls. This bouncing provides nymphs, and to a lesser extent adults, multiple opportunities to repeatedly attempt righting themselves following a jump. Additionally, the spotted lanternfly will also perform aerial reorientation and terrestrial righting as means to right itself, collectively giving the spotted lanternfly the ability to land on a variety of surfaces and spread rapidly through an environment.

== Host associations ==
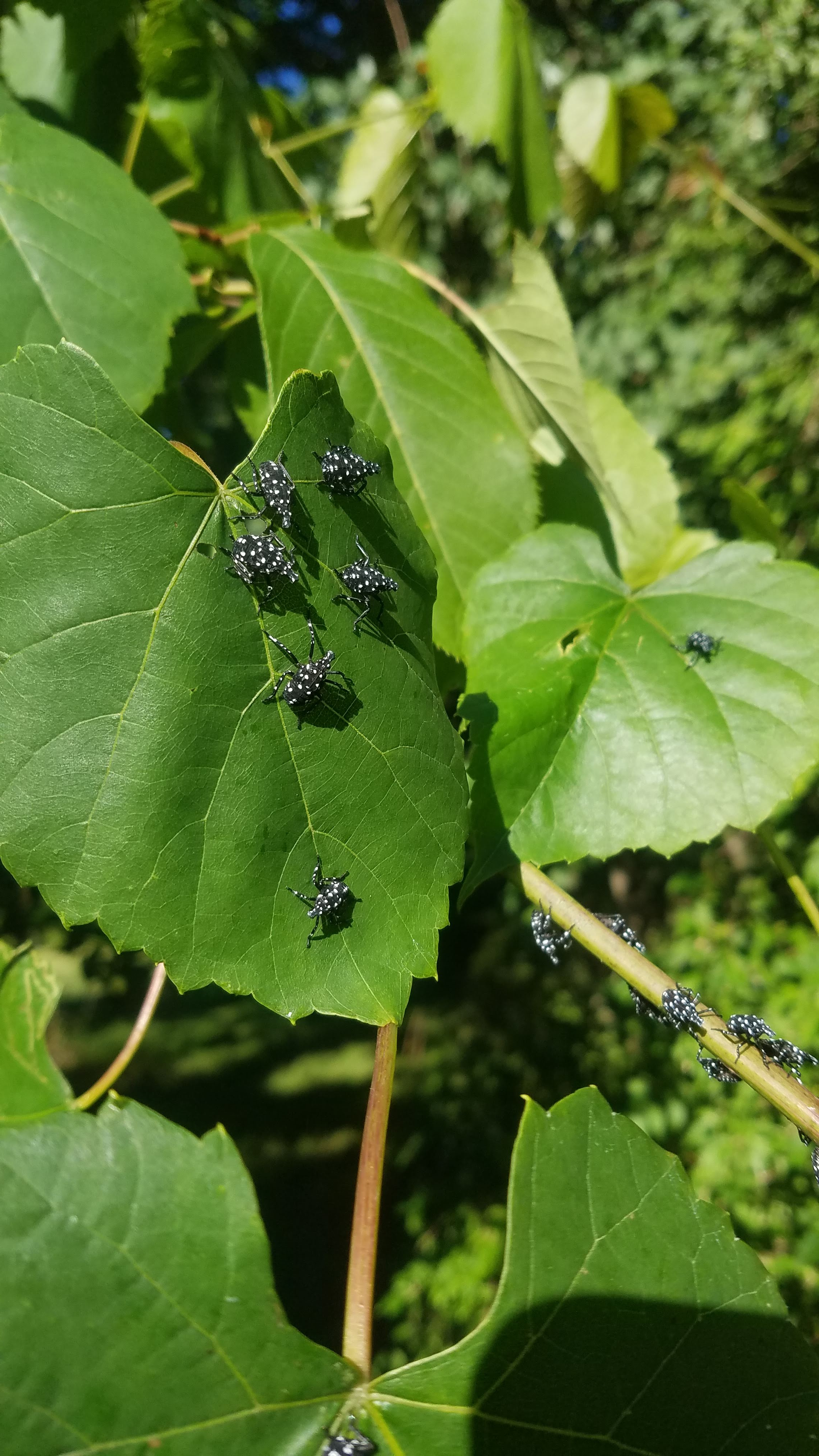
Spotted lanternfly nymphs on Vitis labrusca in Berks County, Pennsylvania, United States, in early July 2018

Ailanthus altissima is a tree native to China but is invasive to many other areas worldwide. It is considered to be the key host for L. delicatula and plays an important role in the lanternfly life cycle. This tree is the preferred host at all documented locations where the lanternfly and A. altissima co-occur. The spotted lanternfly has a host range of over 173 plant species worldwide, including grape vines, fruit trees, ornamental trees, and woody trees, including apple trees and several Rosaceae with stone fruits. Depending on the life stage L. delicatula is in, it may prefer other hosts, such as Juglans nigra. instead of A. altissima.

The spotted lanternfly has feeding behavior associated with 103 plant taxa, accounting for 33 families and 17 orders, with 56 of these plants occurring in the United States. This host range includes many agricultural crops – most significantly soybean (Glycine max) – and common forest plants, as the nymphs are known to associate with other plants beyond A. altissima. The lanternfly has also been recorded causing serious damage on at least 12 ornamental plants such as Parthenocissus quinquefolia, Phellodendron amurense, and Toona sinensis. In the United States, high populations are seen infesting common forest trees, such as maple, birch, and walnut; in Pennsylvania alone, L. delicatula has been found on more than 20 newly recorded host species of woody plants.

L. delicatula feeds on woody and nonwoody plants, piercing the phloem tissue of foliage and stems with specialized mouthparts, and sucking the sap; it does not eat the fruit or the leaves per se. The sugary waste fluid they produce can coat leaves and stems, which encourages mold growth and can impede photosynthesis. Lycorma delicatula feed on sap from the trunk or branches of their host plants; because they can appear in such large numbers on a single plant, they can directly cause substantial damage to, and effectively kill parts or the whole of the host.

L. delicatula also indirectly affects the health and productivity of their hosts and nearby plants through the production of large amounts of honeydew, the lanternfly's sugary secretions of excess waste and sap, as well as by leaving feeding scars in the host plant's branches that continue to drip sap. The accumulation of this thick honeydew and tree sap on leaves below the host plant canopy can lower plants' photosynthetic potential and affect their health; this reduction is even more pronounced by the possible growth of molds over the sugary compound, which further limits light available to affected plants. The accumulation of sap and honeydew also attracts many species of ants, bees, and wasps; infestations of L. delicatula may thus be hinted at by unusual amounts of molds or stinging insects around specific plants. Bees often use spotted lanternfly honeydew to produce late-season honey.

== Life cycle ==
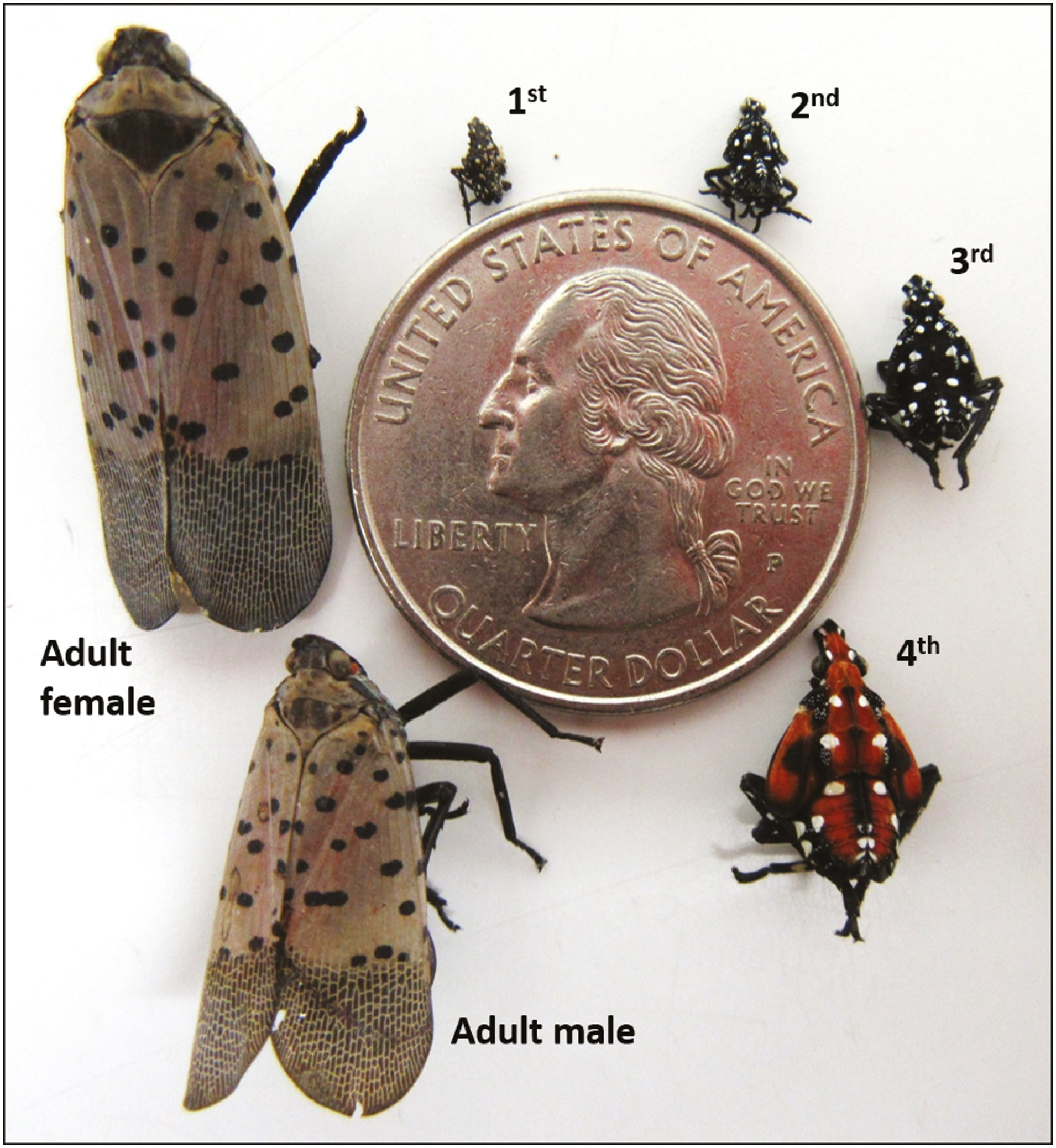
Spotted lanternfly's life cycle (instars) with size comparison to a U.S. quarter (24 mm, 1.0 in)

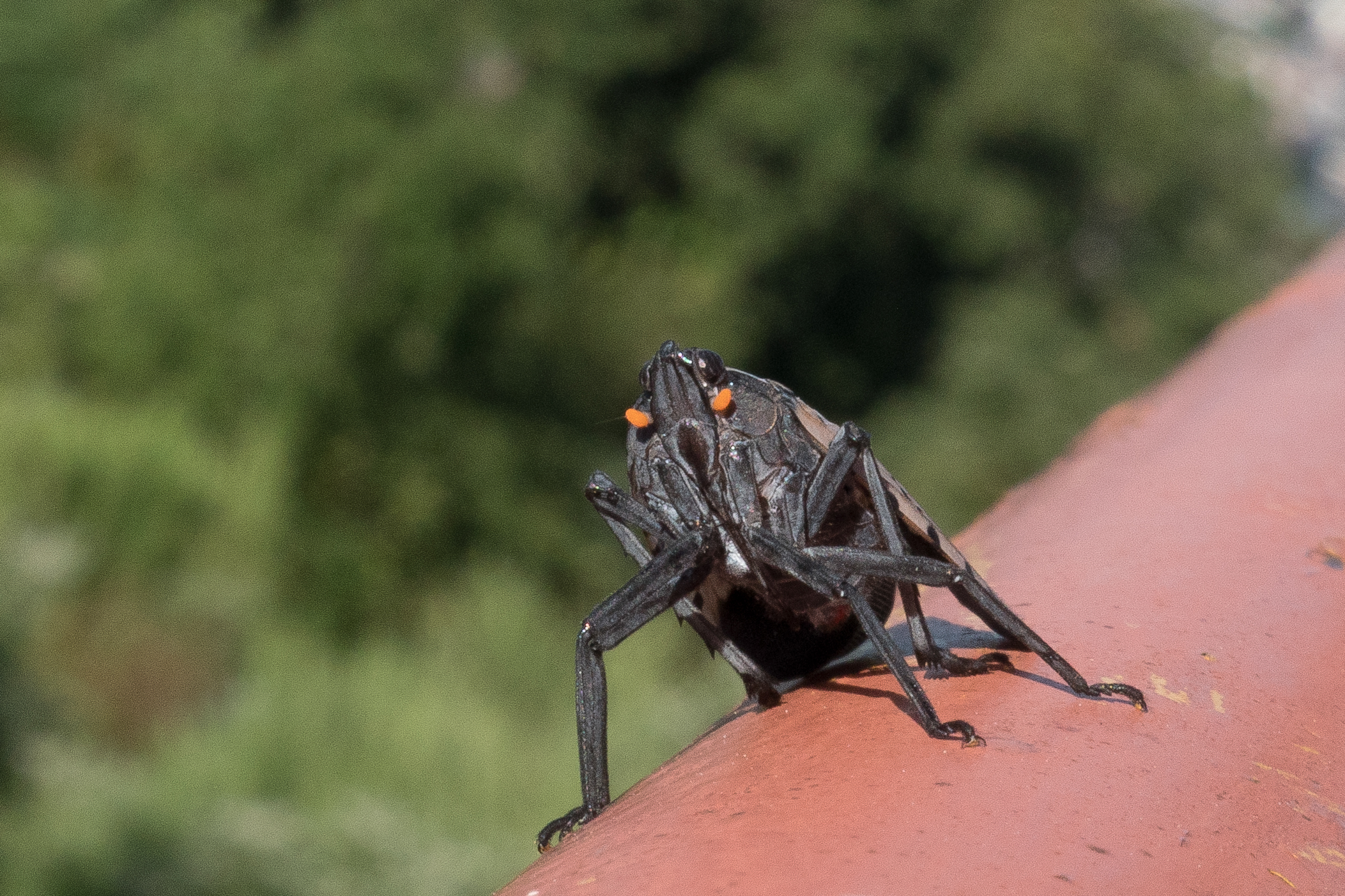
An adult lanternfly

Nymphs typically hatch from their egg cases starting in late April or early May, marking the beginning of the lanternfly's developmental stages. A nymph passes through several immature stages, all of which are wingless. In the first instar, it is black with white spots. Later instars have red patches in addition to the white spots. The final nymphal instar has red wing pads and a red upper body, before molting to the adult form, with a black head and grayish wings with black spots. Nymphs hop or crawl to search for plants on which to feed. Young nymphs (first through third instars) appear to have a wider host range early on, which narrows as they grow older. Though lanternflies have been recorded feeding on several herbaceous plants, this is most likely due to early-instar nymphs climbing or falling onto these plants; late-instar nymphs and adult lanternflies have no reliable association with herbaceous plants.

As early as July, adults can be seen, and they mate and lay eggs from late September through the onset of winter. During mating periods, spotted lanternflies will perform migratory flights. During these migrations, adult L. delicatula will perform a brief courtship and copulation which will last for up to 4 hours. In their native Indomalayan habitat, they lay their eggs preferably on tree of heaven (A. altissima), which is a poisonous invasive species. This host choice is thought to have evolved as a mechanism of protection from natural enemies.

The spotted lanternfly has been found to be capable of reproducing using hosts other than A. altissima, but they generally fail to reach high populations unless A. altissima is present. Many hypotheses are given as to why L. delicatula may have preferences for feeding on certain plants. Two examples of possible factors being investigated are the contribution of the overall sugar composition in the plant and the presence of toxic chemicals. The lanternfly lays eggs upon any smooth-trunked tree, stone, or vertical smooth surface, including man-made items such as vehicles, yard furniture, farm equipment, or other items stored outside.

The egg masses contain 30–50 eggs covered in a yellowish-brown, waxy deposit, often referred to as an egg case. L. delicatula eggs undergo diapause during embryonic development, requiring two weeks of warm temperatures following winter before hatching is induced. Eggs overwintered for five months or longer demonstrate higher hatch rates and more synchronous hatching, suggesting that cold temperatures increase overall egg survival rates. The majority of adults die off by the end of December.

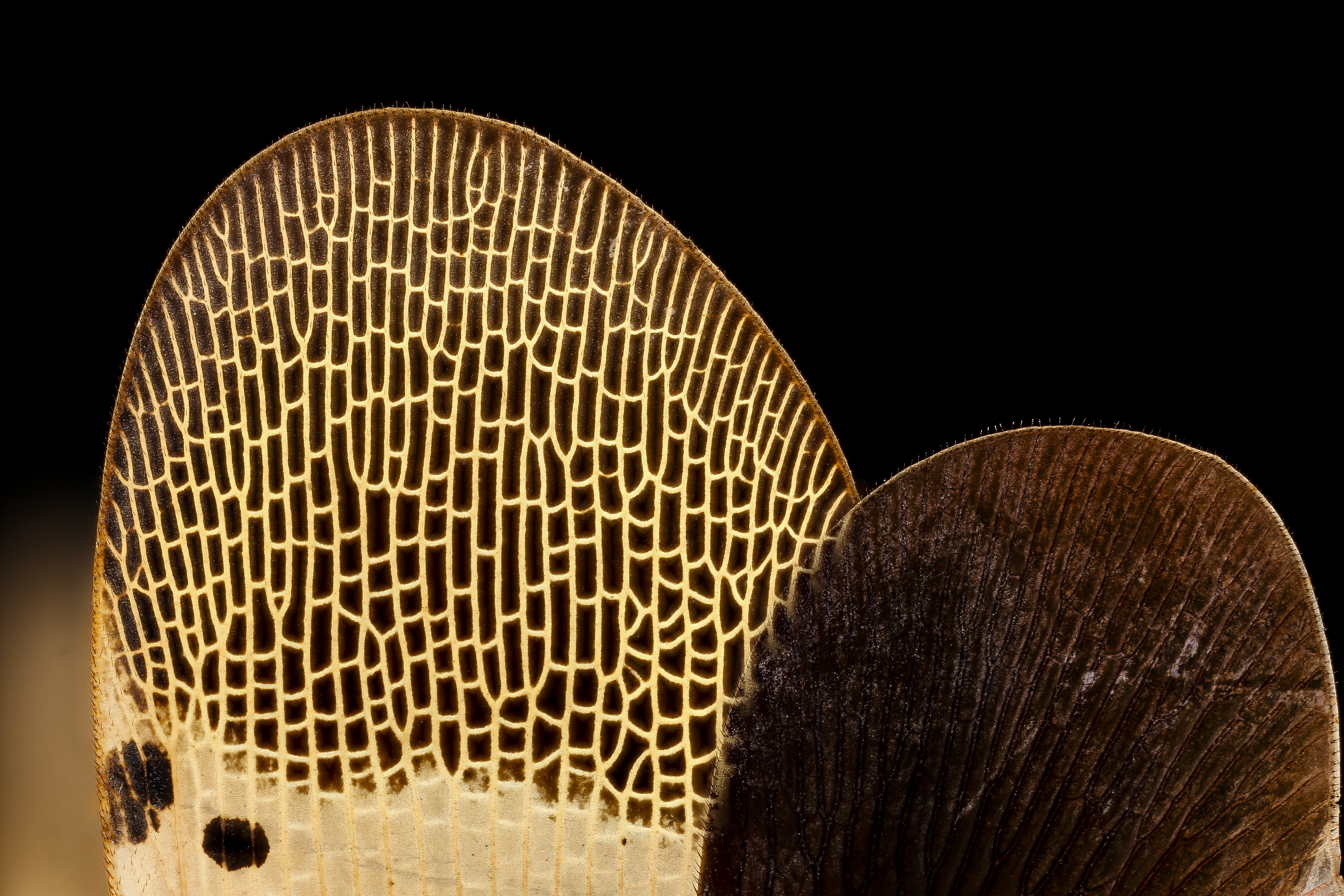
Closeup of "brick and mortar" wing structure

Testing has been done to determine how overwintering affects the eggs of this species. The highest temperature that will still kill eggs was estimated by South Korean researchers to be between −12.7 and −3.4 °C (9.1 and 25.9 °F) on the basis of mean daily temperatures during their winter of 2009–2010. This estimate contrasts with eggs having survived the much colder winter 2013–2014 temperatures in Pennsylvania, United States. Another study done at Rutgers University suggested that −25 °C (−13 °F) is about the temperature at which no eggs are hatched, while −15 °C (5 °F) still had limited hatching, depending upon how long they were chilled and where they were kept.

== Distribution ==
=== Native range ===
The spotted lanternfly is native to China and subtropical regions of Southeast Asia. Fossil evidence indicates L. delicatula evolved between 55 and 51.6 myr, during the Ypresian Era. Phylogenomic analysis has shown that L. delicatula originally evolved in southwest China, eventually diverging into six phylogeographic lineages. One of these lineages then moved northward, following the Yangtze River during the late Pleistocene Era.

In the 1930s, L. delicatula was known to inhabit the Northern Provinces of Shanxi, Shandong and Hebei. Since then, it has expanded its range to include Anhui, Beijing, Guangdong, Henan, Jiangsu, Sichuan, Yunnan and Zhejiang. In traditional Chinese medicine, the spotted lanternfly is believed to be poisonous, and has been used since the 1100s for topical relief from swelling. L. delicatula has also been reported in Taiwan, Vietnam, and India, but ongoing research has yet to conclude whether the species is native to these regions.

=== Accidental introduction ===
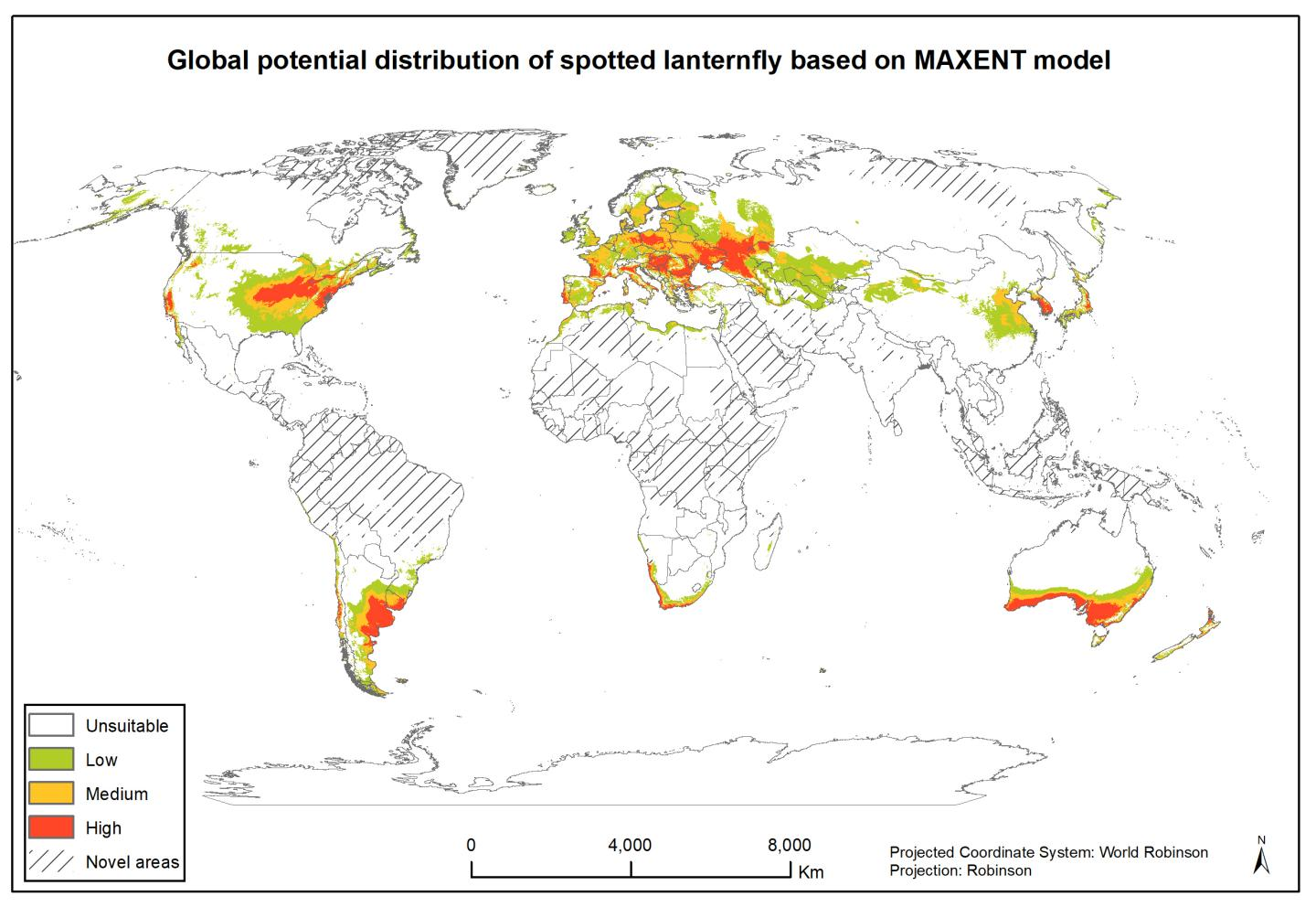
Projected map (from 2019) by the US Department of Agriculture and Xinjiang Institute of Ecology and Geography on potentially suitable habitats for the spotted lanternfly globally

Lycorma delicatula normally uses A. altissima for feeding and laying eggs, but if it is not present, the insect can lay its eggs on any stationary object, natural or man-made, and feeds on a wide variety of plants. Eggs can easily be moved from place to place without being noticed, giving them an easy way to spread to new areas. Its initial introduction to the United States is believed to have been through this pathway, hitchhiking on an object imported from Asia into Pennsylvania. Adults of L. delicatula jump around the area to find new host plants. As nymphs, they feed on whatever host plant the egg was laid on before moving to another in the area. L. delicatula is capable of surviving and completing its life cycle in environments without its preferred host, A. altissima, albeit with greatly reduced fitness.

It is believed that they spread from Shanghai to South Korea, and then to the United States. The American population appears to be descended from the urban (as opposed to the genetically different rural) Shanghai population.

==== In South Korea ====
In 2006, the spotted lanternfly was introduced in South Korea, and has been considered a pest since about 2007. It has since expanded its host range, attacking at least 65 plant species, uninhibited by natural predators. The distribution of L. delicatula has since been predicted using a modeling approach, which showed that this pest has the potential to occur in the majority of South Korea.

A correlation seems to exist between the widespread distribution of A. altissima and overall damage to grapevines. The tree is commonly found growing on the peripheries of Korean vineyards and L. delicatula has been documented as a pest to grapevines, leading to a decline in the total number and overall quality of the harvested grapes. No quantitative data has been published supporting this correlation, but it has been widely hypothesized.

==== In Japan ====
In 2009, Japan reported its first confirmed presence of the spotted lanternfly, in Komatsu city (Ishikawa Prefecture). In 2013, it was confirmed to have spread into the Fukui Prefecture. Researchers have estimated that the spotted lanternfly may have been entering the country sporadically since the 1930s, but only established a reproducing population around the beginning of the twenty-first century. Specimens found in Japan are genetically identical to populations in Beijing, Tianjin, Qingdao, and Shanghai, China.

==== In the United States ====
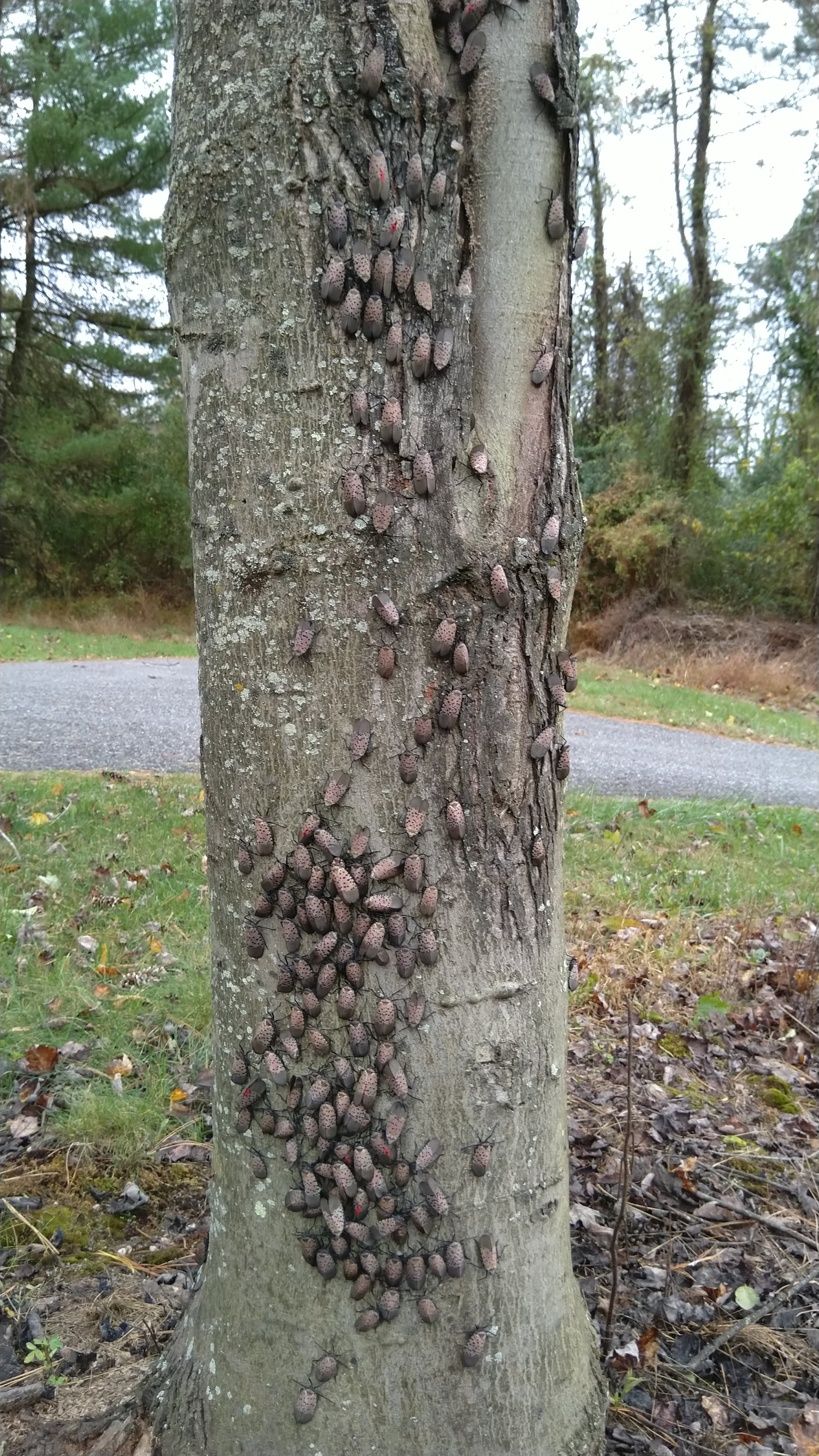
Adult spotted lanternflies on an Acer rubrum in Berks County, Pennsylvania, in mid-October 2019

On 29 September 2014, the Pennsylvania Department of Agriculture (PDA) and the Pennsylvania Game Commission first confirmed the presence of the spotted lanternfly in Berks County, northwest of Philadelphia. Based on its host affinities, it presents a threat to the state's grape, fruit tree, and logging industries. The greatest risk of spread was seen in transportation of materials containing egg masses laid on smooth bark, stone, and other vertical surfaces.

The Pennsylvania Department of Agriculture banned the transport of items that could harbor the egg masses, including firewood, lawn mowers, outdoor chairs, trucks, and recreational vehicles from seven municipalities on 1 November 2014. Considering the old egg masses that were found, it was estimated that the spotted lanternfly might have been in the United States since at least 2012 (thought to have arrived as egg masses on a stone shipment in 2012), and had survived the unusually cold 2013–2014 winter. By March 2021, lanternflies had been found in 34 of the 67 counties in Pennsylvania.

In 2019, Pennsylvania State University estimated statewide costs of the spotted lanternfly to be $99 million in agricultural losses, and $236 million to the forestry industry, annually. Models of the spotted lanternfly's spread projected an annual loss of $554 million, with an additional loss of 4,987 jobs, should it continue to spread to the entirety of Pennsylvania. A national working group led by the U.S. Department of Agriculture, consisting of Penn State Researchers and USDA scientists, was organized "to determine what is known about the lanternfly and what research is needed, including DNA analysis to pinpoint where the infestation originated."

Other states began seeing spotted lanternflies as soon as 2018, and by 2021, they were also confirmed to be established in at least parts of Connecticut, Maryland, Massachusetts, Delaware, New Jersey, New York, Ohio, Indiana, Virginia, and West Virginia, with several of these states issuing quarantine orders. In 2022, the species was confirmed to be present in North Carolina, Michigan and Rhode Island. In September 2023, Illinois confirmed the presence of spotted lanternfly in the state. The same month, the state government of Tennessee confirmed the detection of a spotted lanternfly (SLF) in its Davidson County, making Tennessee the 16th state to detect the spotted lanternfly.

In October 2024, their presence was reported in Northern Kentucky, especially in Covington.

A large potential range exists for the spotted lanternfly to become established in almost all of the eastern part of the country, as well as critical wine- and hop-growing valleys of the Pacific coastal states.

Dead spotted lanternfly specimens have been reported in Kansas, Oregon and California, although no live sightings have been reported from these states as of September 2023. The discoveries of dead specimens have increased concerns for possible accidental introduction of the insect to yet more states where they can potentially become established.

==== In Canada ====
Canadian Food Inspection Agency has identified a risk of the SLF entering the country and has previously intercepted adult lanternflies traveling to Ontario in shipping crates. The primary concern is the potential damage the lanternflies could cause to the wine, fruit, and vegetable industries. The Canadian government and agricultural industries are concerned about maintaining quarantine and have expressed hope that quarantine efforts in the United States are successful. Although most of Canada is an unsuitable habitat for L. delicatula, southwestern Ontario and southerly parts of other provinces are modeled to have low suitability for inhabitation. L. delicatula had been theorized to be capable of maintaining a small population in the region although no specimens had been discovered. (As of October 2009) Later, in September 2024, lanternflies were found in Ontario.

==== In Europe ====
The European and Mediterranean Plant Protection Organization classifies L. delicatula as an A1 pest and anticipates it becoming invasive in Europe. CLIMEX modeling of potential habitats for L. delicatula has found that the United Kingdom, France, Belgium, Switzerland, Spain, and Italy may be capable of supporting small L. delicatula populations. Risk analysis of the spotted lanternfly to become established in Europe has been classified as a moderate to high risk, predominately due to the pervasiveness of A. altissima. L. delicatula was observed via iNaturalist in Madrid, Spain on July 17, 2024. In August 2026, the presence was confirmed in Moldova, where the insects were found on Ailanthus altissima in the wild, and in south Hungary a month later.

==== In Australia ====
Modeling for the life cycle of the spotted lanternfly in Australia has found that development and survival may vary throughout the country, should the spotted lanternfly be introduced. Australia's southwest coastal regions are estimated to have a high viability for the spotted lanternfly but Australian Great Dividing Range and Tasmania were found to have the lowest suitability. Both the pervasiveness of A. altissima and the lack of consistent freezing seasons are considered risk factors in L. delicatula establishing populations in the country.

== Possible pest control ==
Pest control measures and guidelines have been issued by the Pennsylvania Department of Agriculture and its Penn State Extension. These guidelines include killing L. delicatula eggs between the months of October and May by scraping them off surfaces, "double bag them and throw them in the garbage." People can scrape the eggs directly into plastic bags containing alcohol and/or hand sanitizer to kill them. The PDA has recommended removal of preferred spotted lanternfly hosts, such as tree of heaven (Ailanthus altissima), saving only male trees to use as "trap" trees, since the spotted lanternfly is attracted to its preferred hosts. The remaining male "trap trees" should be wrapped with sticky bands starting in early spring to catch any nymphs. Wildlife experts have warned to cover the sticky bands on trees with chicken wire or another similar wire after many reports of other animals (e.g. birds) becoming trapped on them, resulting in injury and/or death.

As of 2020, the PDA recommended several different pesticides to treat infestations, including insecticidal soaps, neem oil, pyrethrins, and essential oils, as well as bifenthrin, carbaryl, dinotefuran as bark spray, imidacloprid, spinosad, tebuconazole, and zeta-cypermethrin. Infested trees can be treated with systemic pesticides from June to August. The PDA recommends tree injection and bark sprays, applied by professional applicators, and soil drench and foliar sprays, which can be applied by homeowners.

In Pennsylvania and Korea, use of brown sticky traps has been effective at capturing nymphs, though adults may be strong enough to escape the adhesive. The spotted lanternfly is known to avoid changes in tree texture and obstacles along the tree trunk, and inward facing traps have shown the greatest efficacy with minimized ecological impact. L. delicatula has been found to be attracted to certain kairomones released by their host plants, and adults and second- to fourth-instar nymphs are also attracted to spearmint oil. Such chemicals (like methyl salicylate) may be used to lure them into sticky traps to augment this pest control method.

Researchers using infrared thermography have found that the spotted lanternfly emits long-wavelength infrared (8–14 μm) light during active feeding and rapid hemolymph circulation, indicating a means of early detection. Trained dogs are capable of detecting winterized egg masses.

As of 2013, researchers are investigating another method of controlling lanternfly populations through reduction of Ailanthus altissima populations; the use of a fungal pathogen, Verticillium nonalfalfae, has been found to effectively kill the invasive trees by causing vascular wilt. It is thought that lanternflies, which feed on this host plant by piercing and sucking the sap from its vasculature, may be able to "aid" in the ongoing removal of A. altissima by functioning as a vector for the V. nonalfalfae pathogen between different individuals of the insects' preferred host. Researchers have not yet found this to be an effective method, and more research is needed to confirm if this is possible in field settings with V. nonalfalfae or other pathogens.

Four species of fungal entomopathogens native to the United States have been identified to cause co-epizootics in the spotted lanternfly. Beauveria bassiana, Batkoa major, Metarhizium pemphigi and Ophiocordyceps delicatula (in the family Entomophthoraceae) have been found to parasitize and kill the spotted lanternfly, with Beauveria bassiana having also shown an ability to kill spotted lanternflies in biopesticide trials.

A few natural predators have been identified in the lanternfly's native habitat in China, but are not yet used in biocontrol. Dryinus sinicus, a dryinidae wasp, and Ooencyrtus kuvanae, a chalcid wasp, have been found to parasitize spotted lanternfly eggs and nymphs. Ooencyrtus kuvanae was previously introduced into the United States in 1908 for population control of Lymantria dispar dispar and was first documented to parasitize spotted lanternfly egg masses in 2017. Another biocontrol predator being tested is the eupelmid wasp Anastatus orientalis, due to its high rates of parasitism of eggs. This wasp is under investigation in South Korea and in the United States, where it is being evaluated under quarantine until researchers are certain it will not become an invasive species and attack other insects.

New York City officials have encouraged members of the public to kill individual spotted lanternflies on sight, abandoning earlier efforts that encouraged residents to scrape the insects' eggs off trees. In a 2023 interview with The New York Times, Cornell University entomologist Daniel Gilrein described the killing of individual insects as making residents feel engaged and empowered, while only having a "marginal" effect on the lanternfly population.

== Photos ==
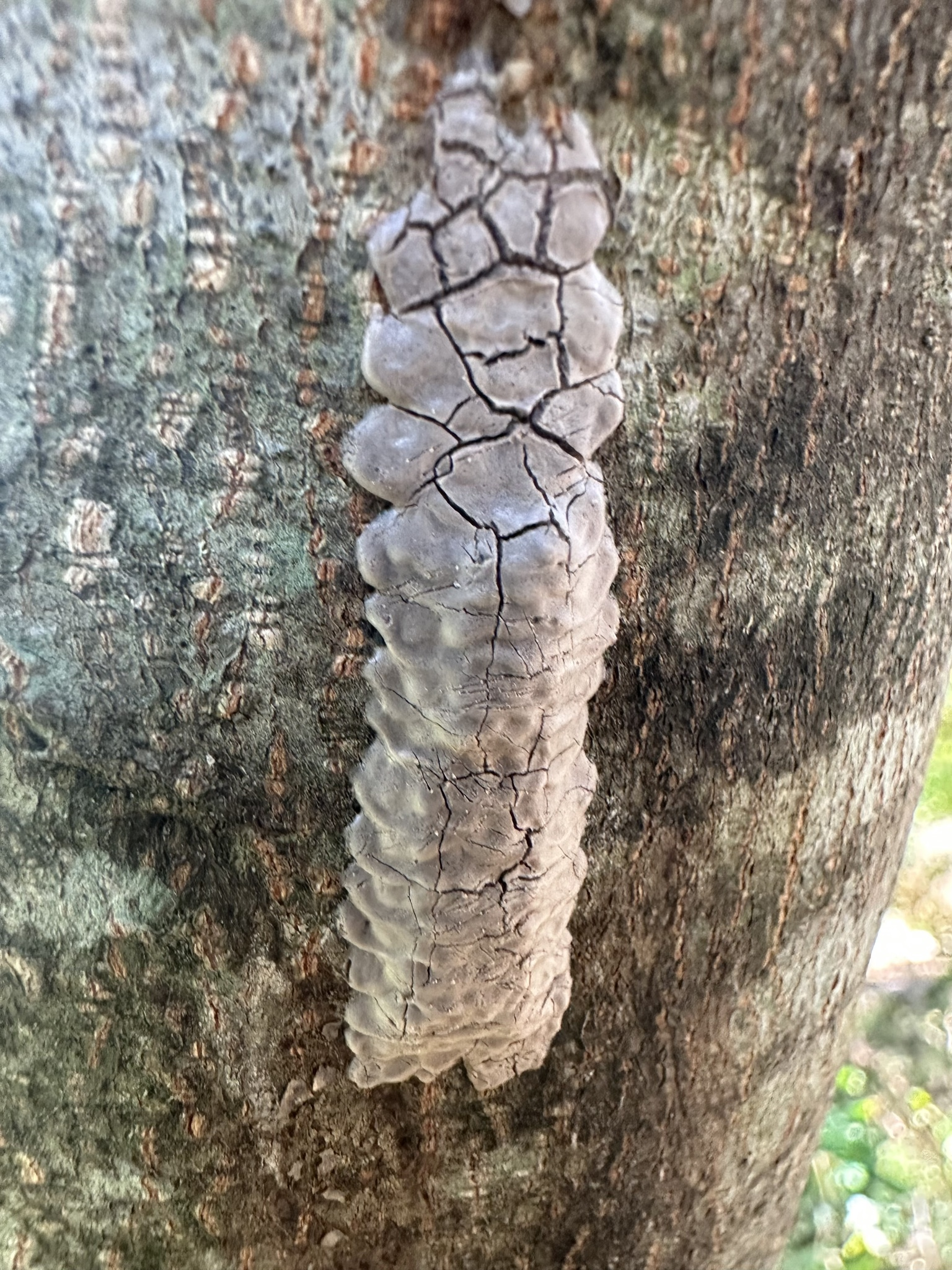
Spotted lanternfly eggs on the bark of a tree

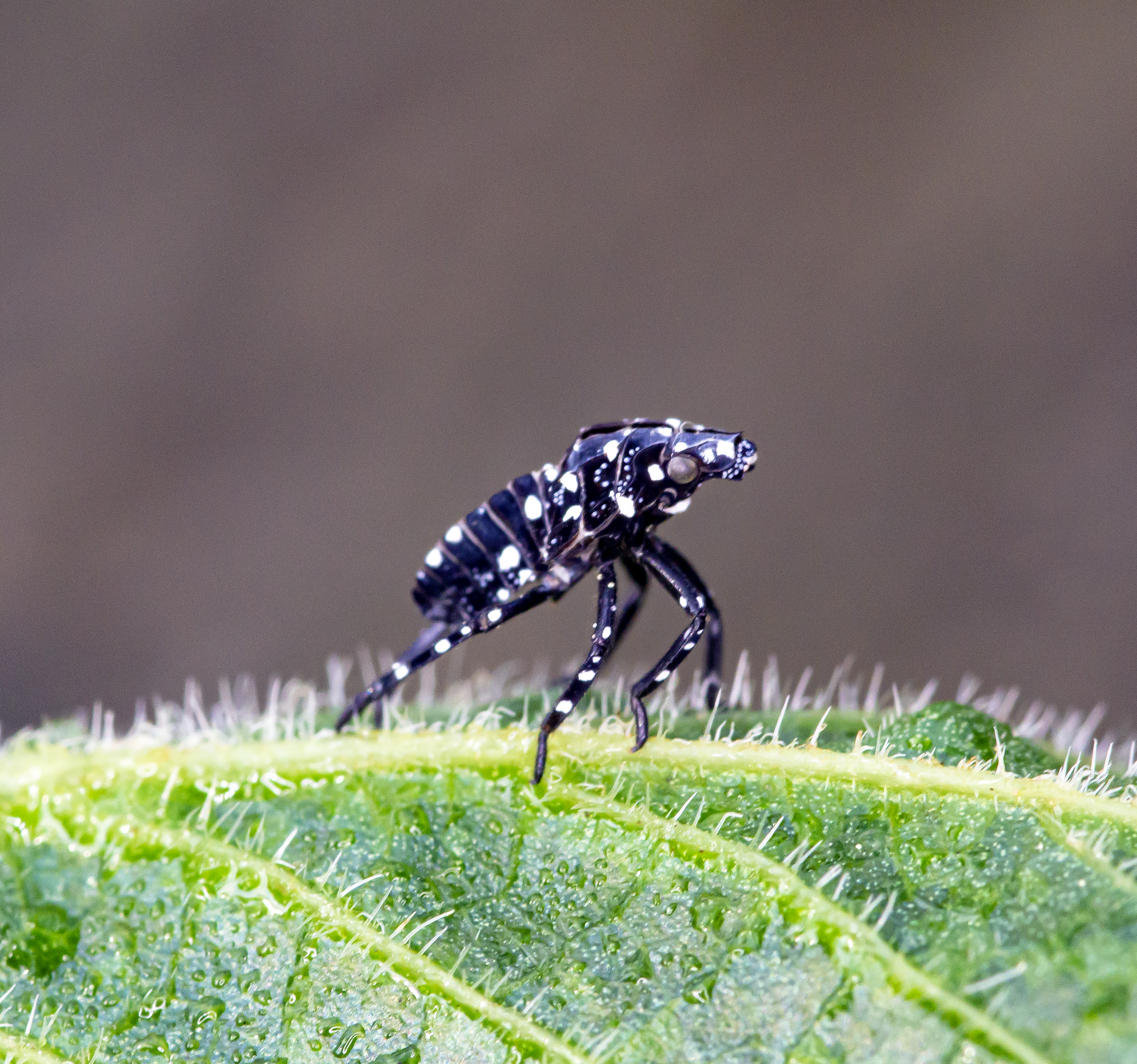
Spotted lanternfly early-instar nymph on a grape leaf

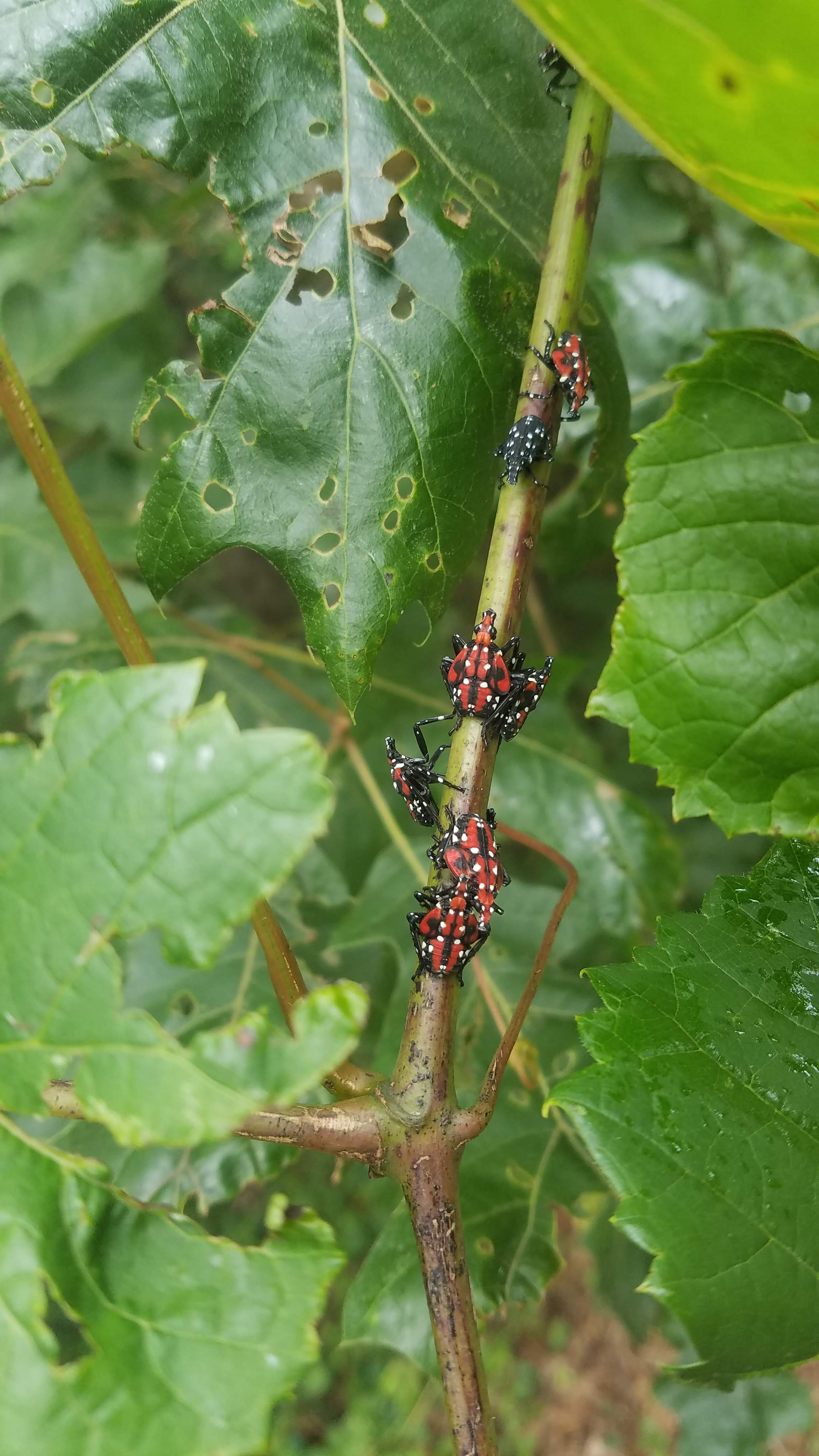
Late-instar nymphs of spotted lanternfly on Vitis labrusca in Berks County, Pennsylvania, in late July 2018

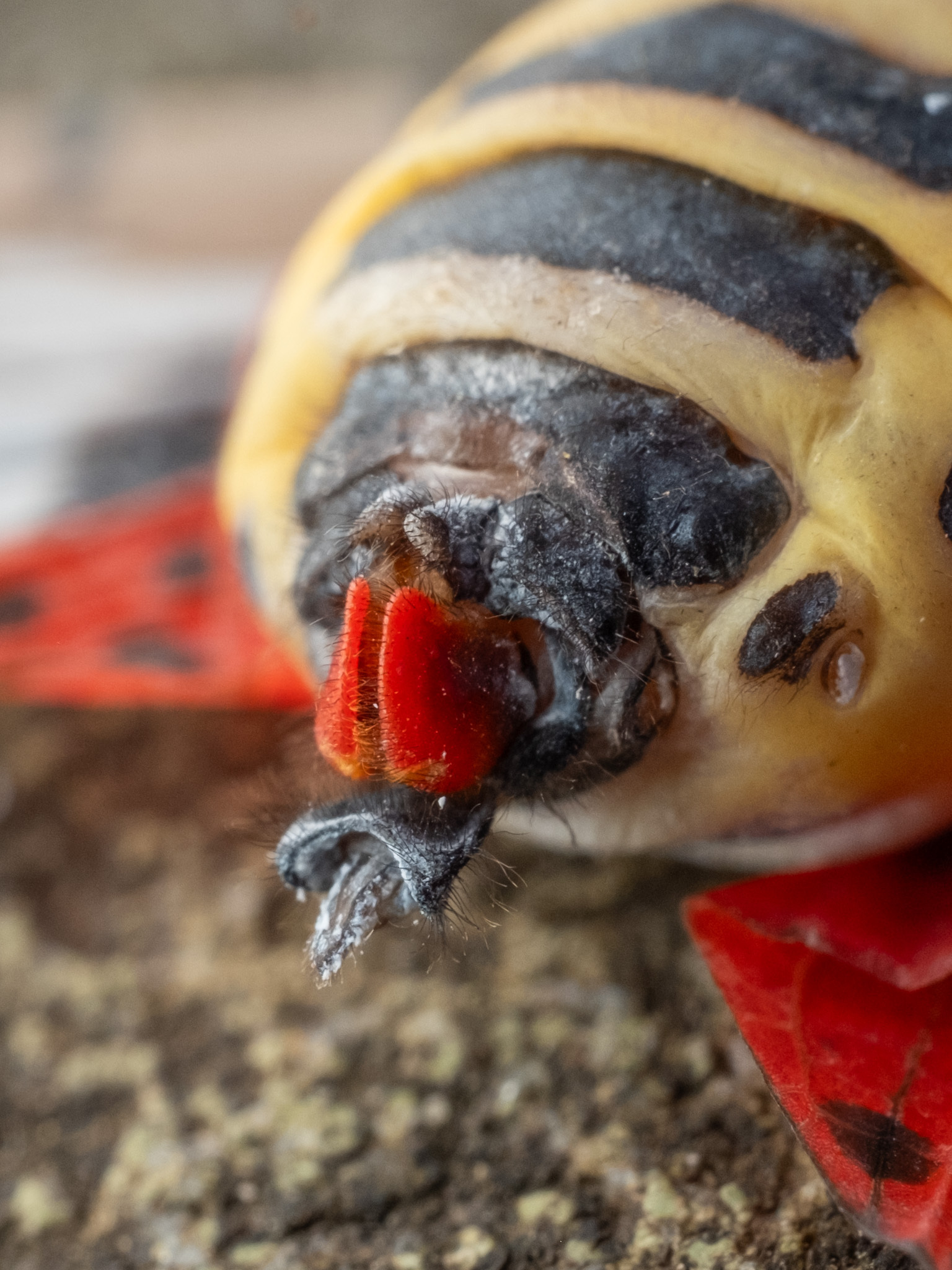
Red valvifers on a female spotted lanternfly

"Honeydew" on Euonymus leaves

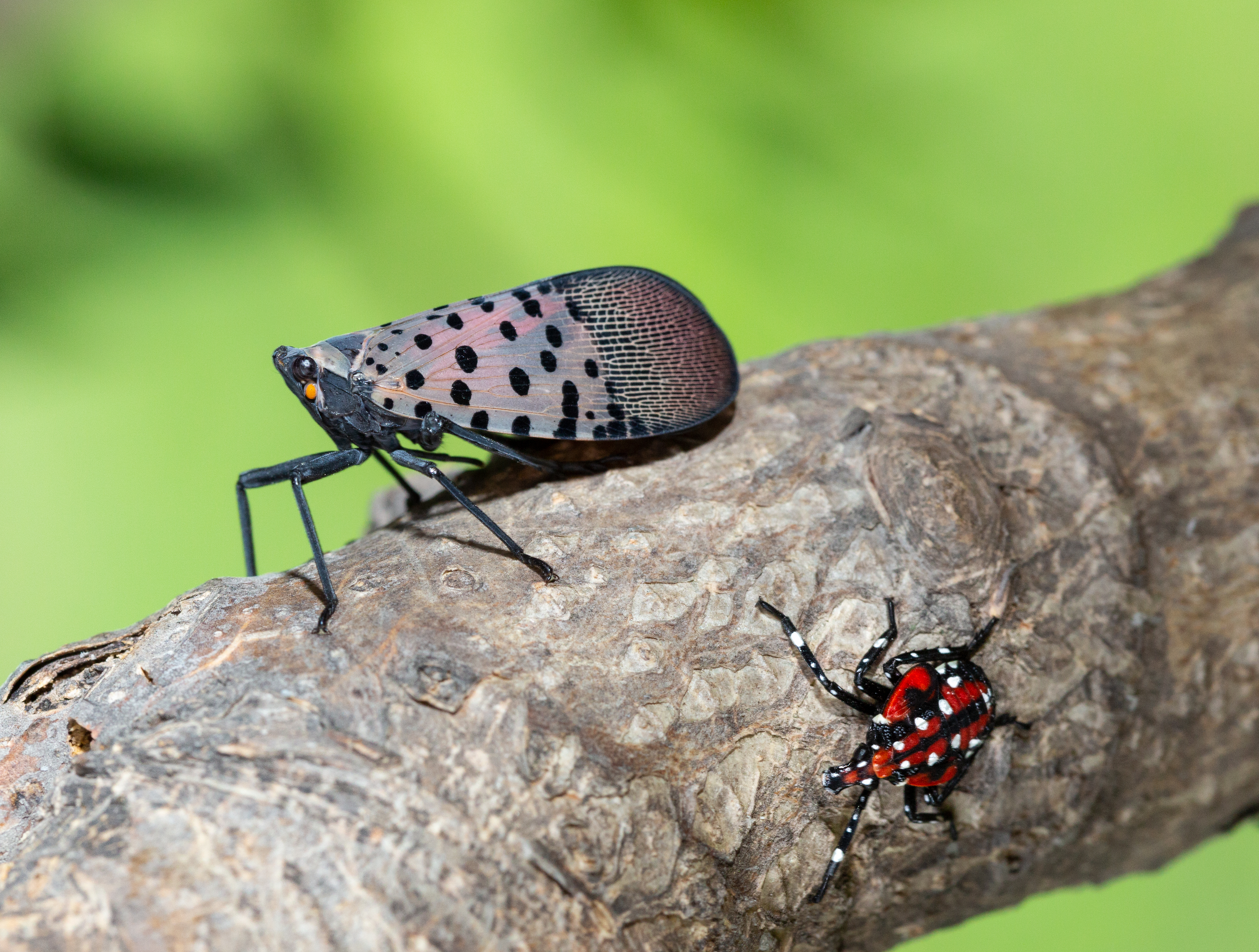
Two spotted lantern-flies on a tree branch

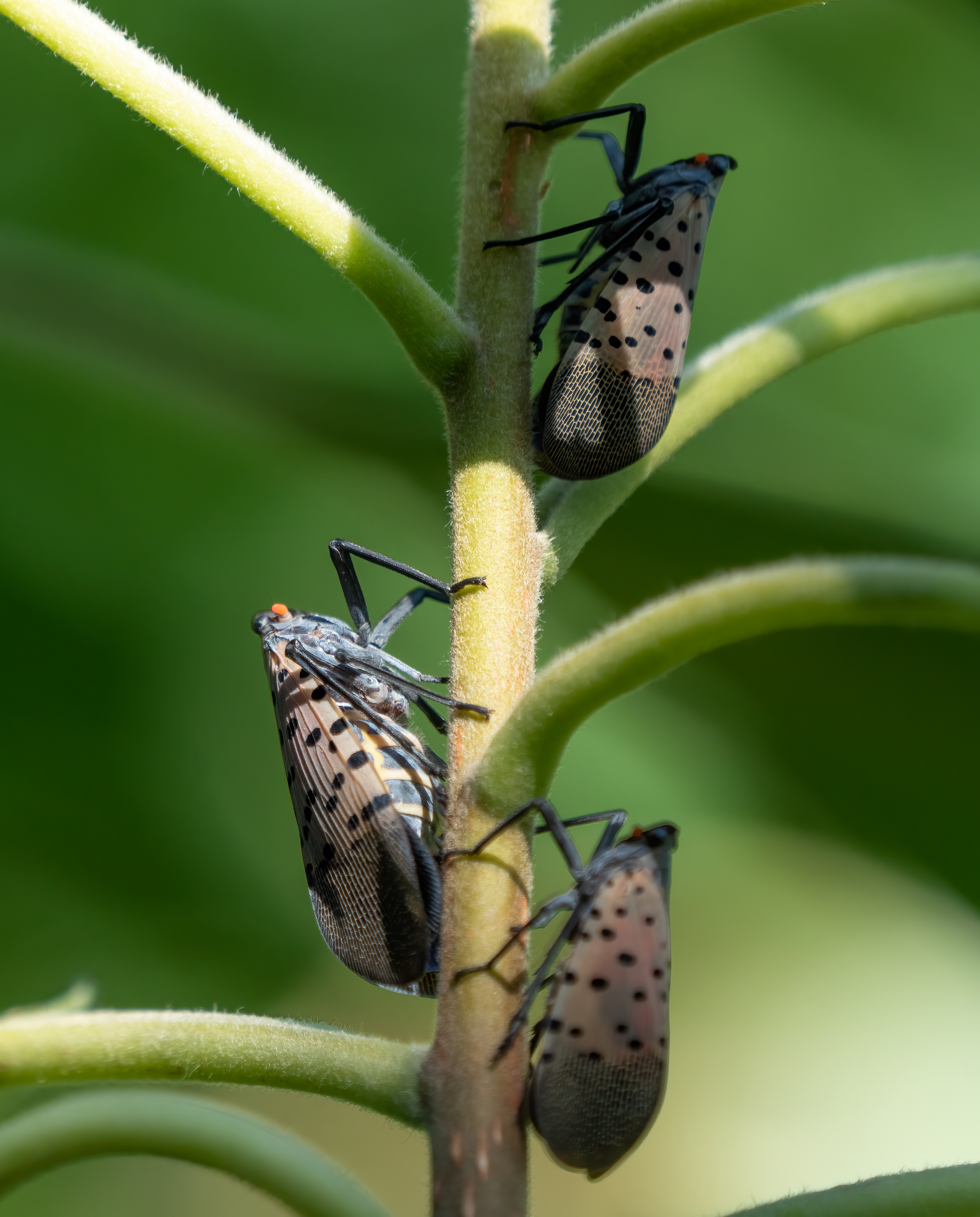
Adult spotted lanternflies in Brooklyn Botanic Garden in September 2021

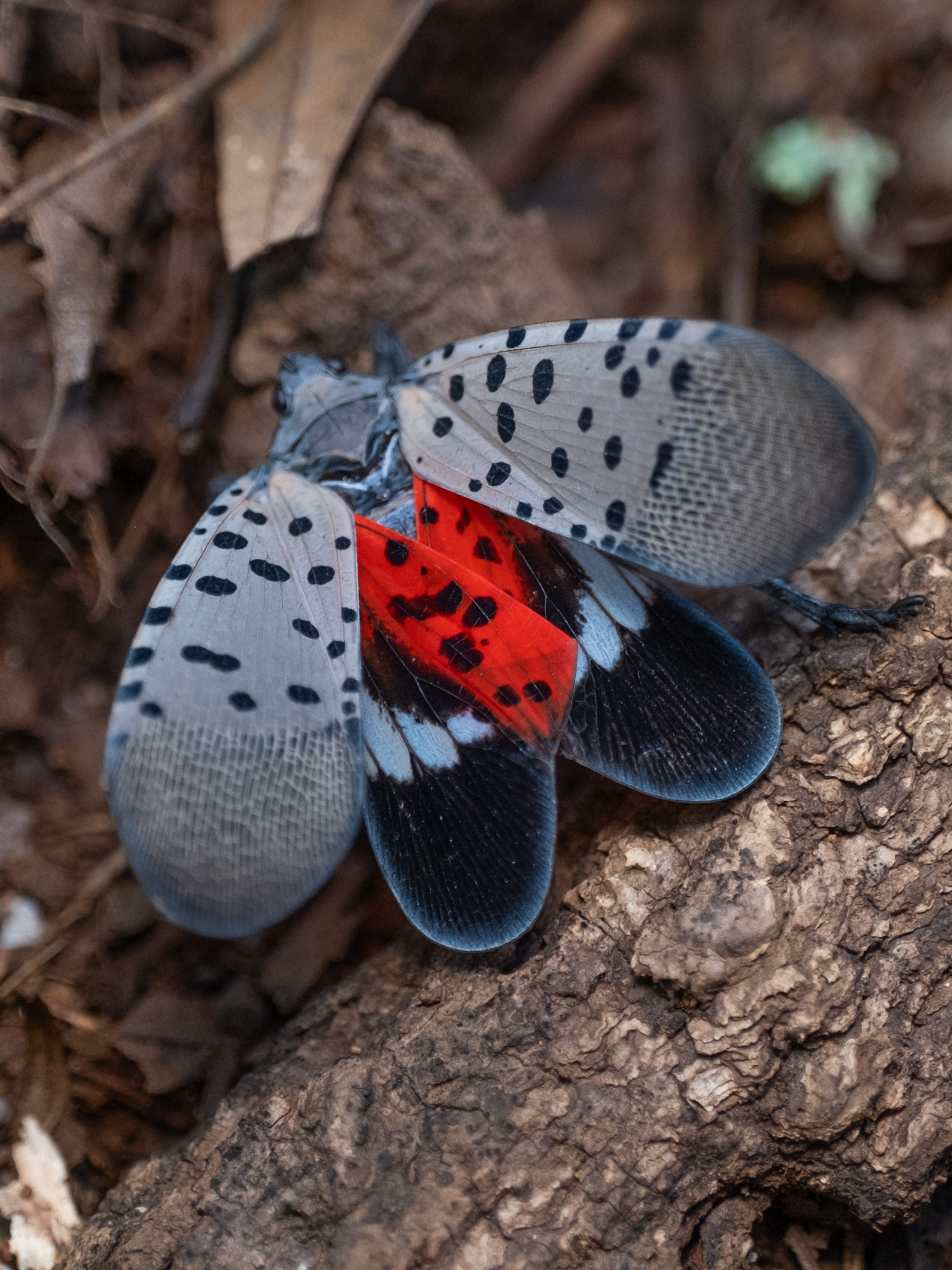
Adult with spread forewings in Shenandoah National Park, Virginia, USA

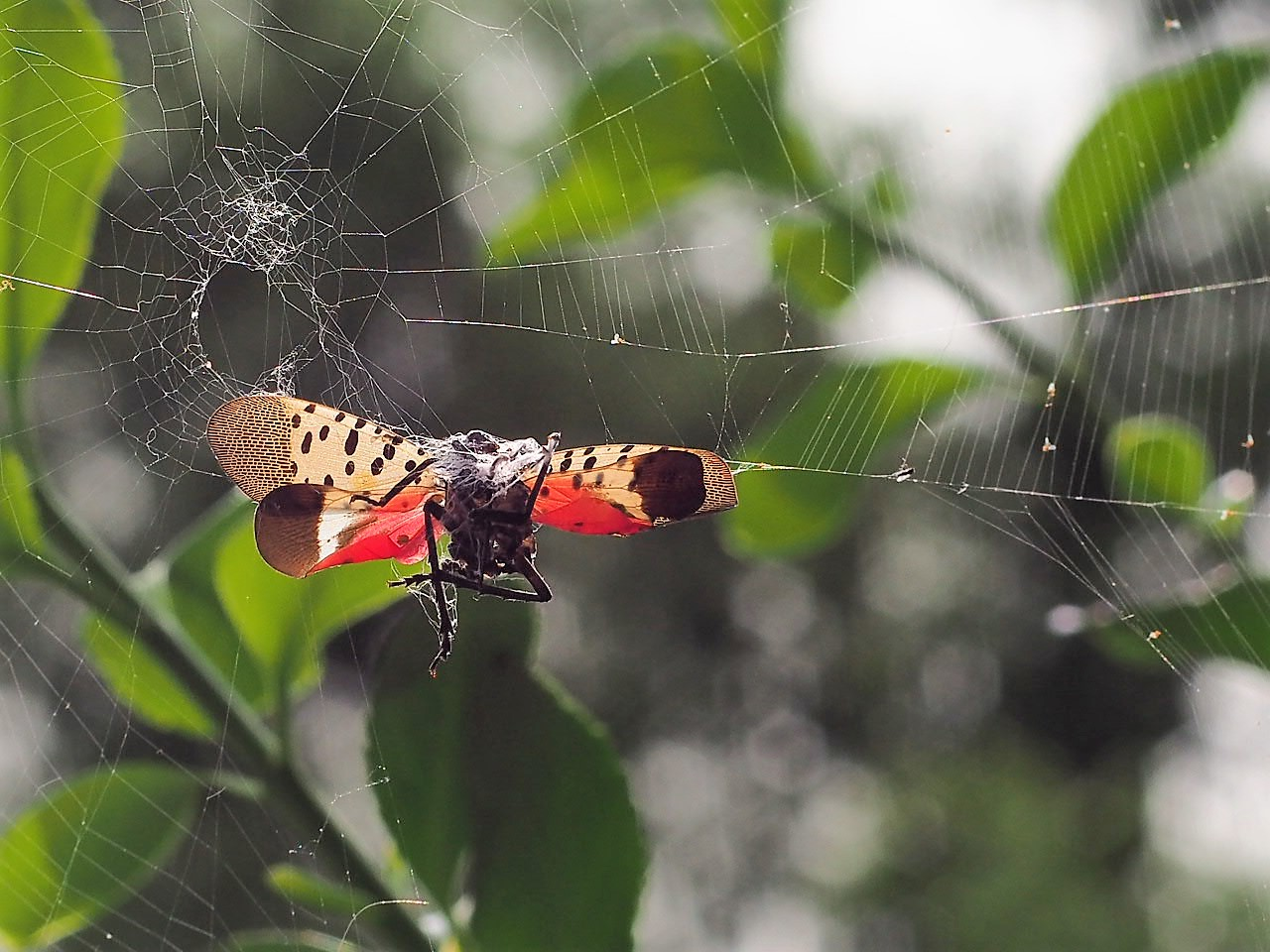
Adult spotted lanternfly caught and eaten by a spider in Delaware County, Pennsylvania, in September 2020

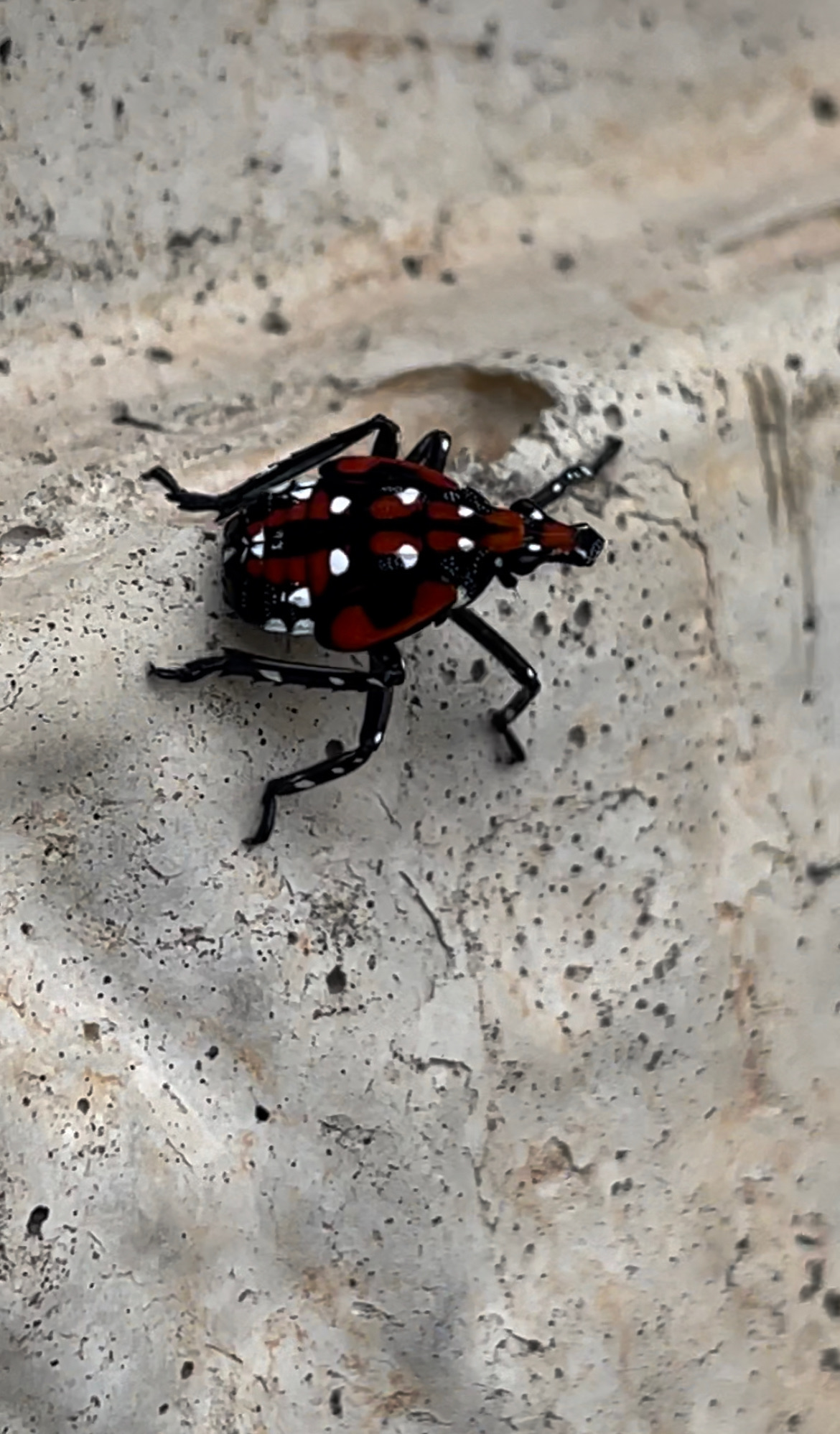
4th instar nymph in South Korea
