= Lycorma punicea =

Scientific classification
- Kingdom: Animalia
- Phylum: Arthropoda
- Clade: Pancrustacea
- Class: Insecta
- Order: Hemiptera
- Suborder: Auchenorrhyncha
- Infraorder: Fulgoromorpha
- Family: Fulgoridae
- Genus: Lycorma
- Species: L. punicea

Binomial name
- Lycorma punicea Hope, 1843

Species of insect

Lycorma punicea is a planthopper species indigenous to parts of India, China, and Bangladesh. L. punicea was originally discovered in 1843 by Frederick William Hope.

== Taxonomy ==
Lycorma punicea is a species in the genus Lycorma, in the planthopper family Fulgoridae, subfamily Aphaeninae. Species within this genus are found in Asia. It was originally described in 1843 by Frederick William Hope as Lystra punicea. This species was once considered a subspecies of Lycorma imperialis, but is now considered its own species.

== Description ==
Adult L. punicea range from 12 to 12.5 millimeters in length. The head, legs, abdomen, and thorax are a castaneous-red color. The tegmina is testaceous. 3/4ths of the tegmina are covered by dark, large spots, giving it a much darker appearance. The basal half of the hindwings are purplish-red with black spots, and a gray band across the wing just before the dark black apical area. It is similar to L. imperialis in appearance albeit being much smaller.

== Life cycle ==
Lycorma punicea is hemimetabolous, meaning that it goes through nymphal (instar) stages before molting into an adult, rather than having larval and pupal stages. L. punicea lays eggs coated in a waxy layer much like the rest of the species in its genus during late fall to early winter, and hatches in the spring.

== Distribution and ecology ==
Lycorma punicea is native to Sylhet, India (specifically the Assam and Dikrong Valley areas,) and parts of China. L. punicea, along with the rest of the genus Lycorma, are parasitized by the eupelmid wasp Anastatus orientalis and by Dryinus sinicus, a dryinid wasp.
