= Helenus (mythology) =

In Greek mythology, Helenus (/ˈhɛlənəs/; Ancient Greek: Ἕλενος, romanized: Hélenos) is the name of the following characters:

- Helenus, a son of Zeus and Lysithea, daughter of Evenus.
- Helenus, a prophet, and son of King Priam and Queen Hecuba of Troy.
- Helenus, son of Oenops and an Achaean warrior who participated in the Trojan War. During the siege of Troy, he was killed by Hector and Ares.
- Helenus, one of the Suitors of Penelope from Ithaca along with 11 other wooers. He, with the other suitors, was killed by Odysseus with the assistance of Eumaeus, Philoetius, and Telemachus.
