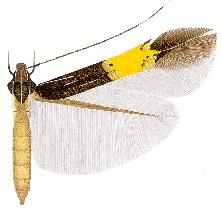

Scientific classification
- Kingdom: Animalia
- Phylum: Arthropoda
- Clade: Pancrustacea
- Class: Insecta
- Order: Lepidoptera
- Family: Cosmopterigidae
- Genus: Cosmopterix
- Species: C. lysithea

Binomial name
- Cosmopterix lysithea Koster, 2010

= Cosmopterix lysithea =

Species of moth

Cosmopterix lysithea is a moth of the family Cosmopterigidae. It is known from the Federal District of Brazil.

Adults have been recorded in March.

== Description ==
Female. Forewing length 3.7 mm. Head: frons shining pale ochreous-grey with greenish reflection, vertex and neck tufts shining brown with reddish gloss, medially and laterally lined white, collar shining dark brown; labial palpus first segment very short, greyish white, second segment three-quarters of the length of third, dark brown with white longitudinal lines laterally and ventrally, third segment white, lined dark brown laterally, extreme apex white; scape dorsally shining dark brown with a white anterior line, ventrally shining white, antenna shining dark brown with a short white line from base to one-fifth, changing into an interrupted line to beyond one-half, followed towards apex by approximately five dark brown segments, eight white, eight dark brown and eight white segments at apex. Thorax and tegulae shining dark brown with reddish gloss, thorax with a white median line, tegulae lined white inwardly. Legs: shining dark brown, femora of midleg and hindleg with pale golden reflection, foreleg with a white line on tibia and tarsal segments one to three and five, tibia of midleg with white oblique basal and medial lines and a white apical ring, tarsal segments one and two with white apical rings, segment five entirely white, tibia of hindleg as midleg, but with an additional pale golden subapical band, tarsal segments one to three with white apical rings, segments four and five dorsally white, spurs white dorsally, dark brown ventrally. Forewing shining dark brown with reddish gloss, four narrow white lines in the basal area, a subcostal from base and slightly running from costa to one-quarter, a very short medial to the end of the subcostal, a subdorsal, slightly longer than the medial, starting at end of the medial, a short dorsal from beyond base to the start of the medial, a bright yellow transverse fascia beyond the middle with an apical protrusion, bordered at the inner edge by two large tubercular golden metallic costal and dorsal spots almost forming a fascia, the costal spot with a patch of blackish scales on the outside, the dorsal spot slightly further from base than the costal, bordered at the outer edge by two tubercular golden metallic costal and dorsal spots, the dorsal spot three times as large as the costal, both spots inwardly lined dark brown, a white costal streak from the outer costal spot, a narrow shining white apical line from the apical protrusion, widening in the apical cilia, cilia dark brown. Hindwing shining dark greyish brown, cilia dark brown. Underside: forewing shining dark greyish brown, the white apical spot distinctly visible in the apical cilia, hindwing shining dark greyish brown. Abdomen dorsally shining pale yellow-ochreous, especially segments two to five, remaining parts greyish brown, ventrally shining yellowish white, anal tuft dorsally greyish brown, ventrally ochreous.

== Etymology ==
The species is named after Lysithea, a figure in Greek mythology and also a moon of Jupiter. To be treated as a noun in apposition.
