= Evenus (mythology) =

Evenus (/ɪˈviːnəs/; Ancient Greek: Εύηνος, romanized: Eúēnos) is the name of several characters in Greek mythology.

- Evenus, a river god or a son of Ares.
- Evenus, father of Lysithea who bore Helenus to Zeus.
- Evenus, king of Lyrnessus and son of Selepus. His two sons, Mynes and Epistrophus, were killed by Achilles when he had raided the place.
