= Masayo Kato =

Japanese entomologist

Masayo Kato (加藤 正世, Katō Masayo; 1898–1967) was a Japanese entomologist.

== Publications ==
- Kato, M. 1925. Japanese Cicadidae, with descriptions of new species. Natural History Society of Formosa 15:1-47
- Kato, M. 1925. Japanese Cicadidae, with descriptions of some new species and genera. Transactions of the Natural History Society of Formosa 15:55-76
- Kato, M. 1926. Japanese Cicadidae, with descriptions of four new species. Transactions of the Natural History Society of Formosa 16:171-176
- Kato, M. 1930. Two new butterflies from Japan and Formosa. Zephyrus 2(4):206-208, 1 fig.
- Kato, M. 1961. Fauna Japonica Vol. 3: Cicadidae (Insecta). Biogeographical Society of Japan, Tokyo

== See also ==
- Category:Taxa named by Masayo Kato
