= Anastatus orientalis =

Scientific classification
- Kingdom: Animalia
- Phylum: Arthropoda
- Clade: Pancrustacea
- Class: Insecta
- Order: Hymenoptera
- Family: Eupelmidae
- Genus: Anastatus
- Species: A. orientalis

Binomial name
- Anastatus orientalis Yang & Choi, 2015

Species of parasitic wasp

Anastatus orientalis is a species of parasitic wasp which preys on Lycorma lanternfly eggs. Females live significantly longer than males, over ten weeks compared to the male lifespan of three weeks.

It may be useful as a control of spotted lanternfly which has become an invasive pest in the United States. 69% of lanternfly egg cases in China were found to be parasitized by the wasp.
