= Lysithea (mythology) =

Greek mythology figures with same name

In Greek mythology, Lysithea (/laɪˈsiːθiə, lɪˈsɪθiə/; Ancient Greek: Λυσιθέα, lit. 'release', 'loosening' or 'goddess of deliverance/ freeing') or Lysithoë (Ancient Greek: Λυσιθόη, lit. 'swift release' or 'quick deliverance') may refer to the following women:

- Lysithea, a daughter of Evenus and mother of Helenus by Zeus. She may be the same or distinct with the below figure.
- Lysithoe, an Oceanid, as the daughter of the Titans Oceanus and his sister-consort Tethys. She was also one of Zeus' many lovers and by him the mother of the first Heracles (out of seven).
- Lysithea, another name of Semele, daughter of King Cadmus of Thebes and mother of Dionysus.
