= Dryinus sinicus =

Scientific classification
- Kingdom: Animalia
- Phylum: Arthropoda
- Clade: Pancrustacea
- Class: Insecta
- Order: Hymenoptera
- Family: Dryinidae
- Genus: Dryinus
- Species: D. sinicus

Binomial name
- Dryinus sinicus Massimo Olmi

Species of dryinid wasp

Dryinus sinicus is a species of wasp that belongs to the family dryinidae. It is native to China.

== Behavior ==
It is a parasitoid of spotted lanternflies (Lycorma delicatula) in their nymph stage. Before parasitizing, the female will kill several lanternfly nymphs in host-feeding. They can be a potential biological pest control agent for invasive populations of spotted lanternflies in North America. Their behavior of killing several nymphs before parasitizing means that recorded rates of mortality are beyond that can be quantified using data from sticky traps.

Their larvae are ectoparasitic with their head being partially embedded in the coelom of the host and the body protruding between 2 sclerites. It is covered by the larval exuviae. Then they will crawl out of the host, killing it, and into a pupate in a silken cocoon.
