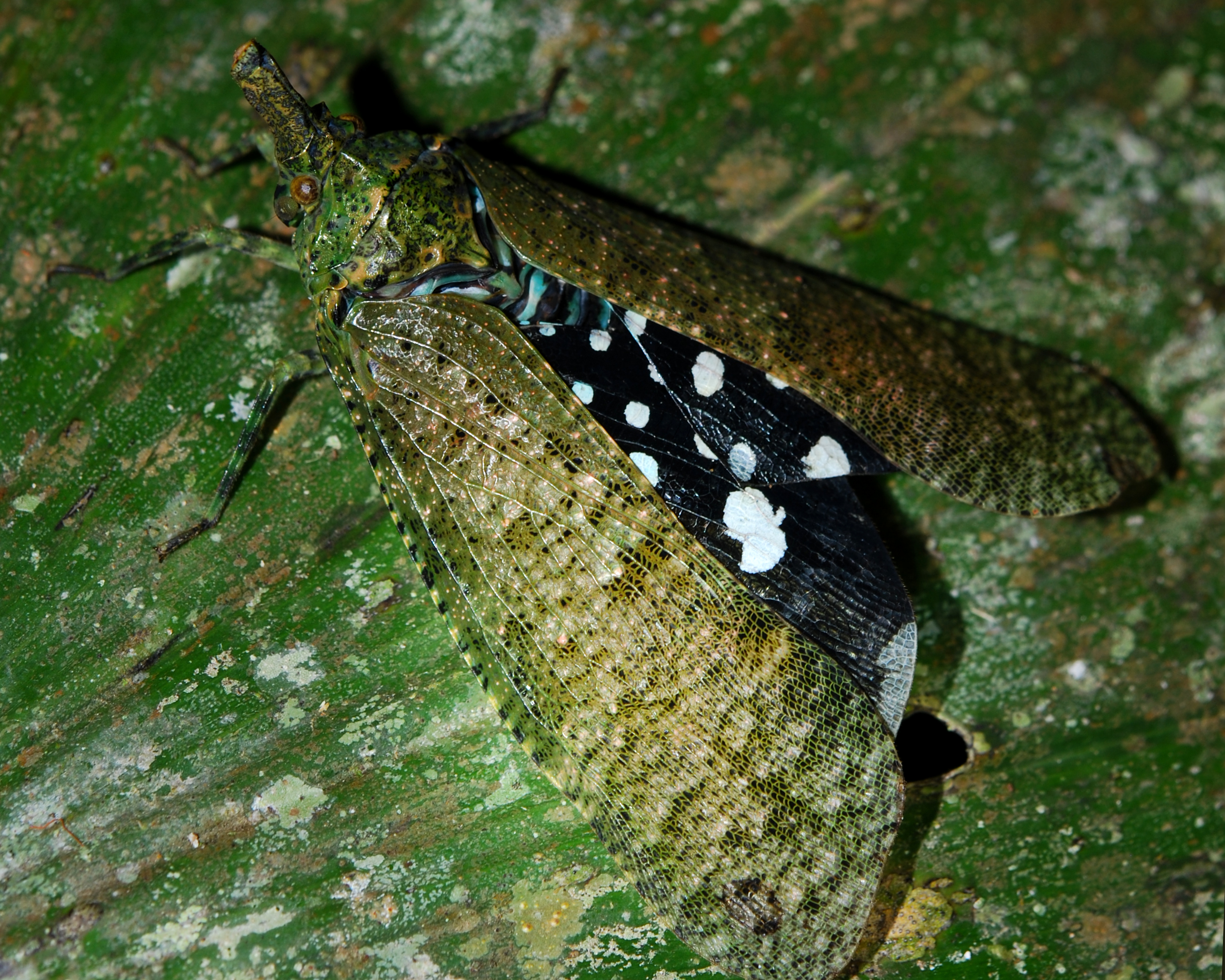
- Diareusa annularis

Scientific classification
- Domain: Eukaryota
- Kingdom: Animalia
- Phylum: Arthropoda
- Class: Insecta
- Order: Hemiptera
- Suborder: Auchenorrhyncha
- Infraorder: Fulgoromorpha
- Family: Fulgoridae
- Subfamily: Fulgorinae
- Tribe: Fulgorini
- Genus: Diareusa; Walker, 1858

= Diareusa =

Genus of planthoppers

Diareusa is a genus of bugs in the subfamily Fulgorinae and tribe Fulgorini, erected by Francis Walker in 1839. Species have been recorded from central and South America.

== Species ==
Fulgoromorpha Lists On the Web includes:

1. Diareusa annularis (Olivier, 1791) - type species (as Fulgora then Phrictus annularis Olivier)
2. Diareusa conspersa Schmidt, 1906 (synonym Diareusa dahli Ossiannilsson, 1940)
3. Diareusa imitatrix Ossiannilsson, 1940
4. Diareusa kemneri Ossiannilsson, 1940
