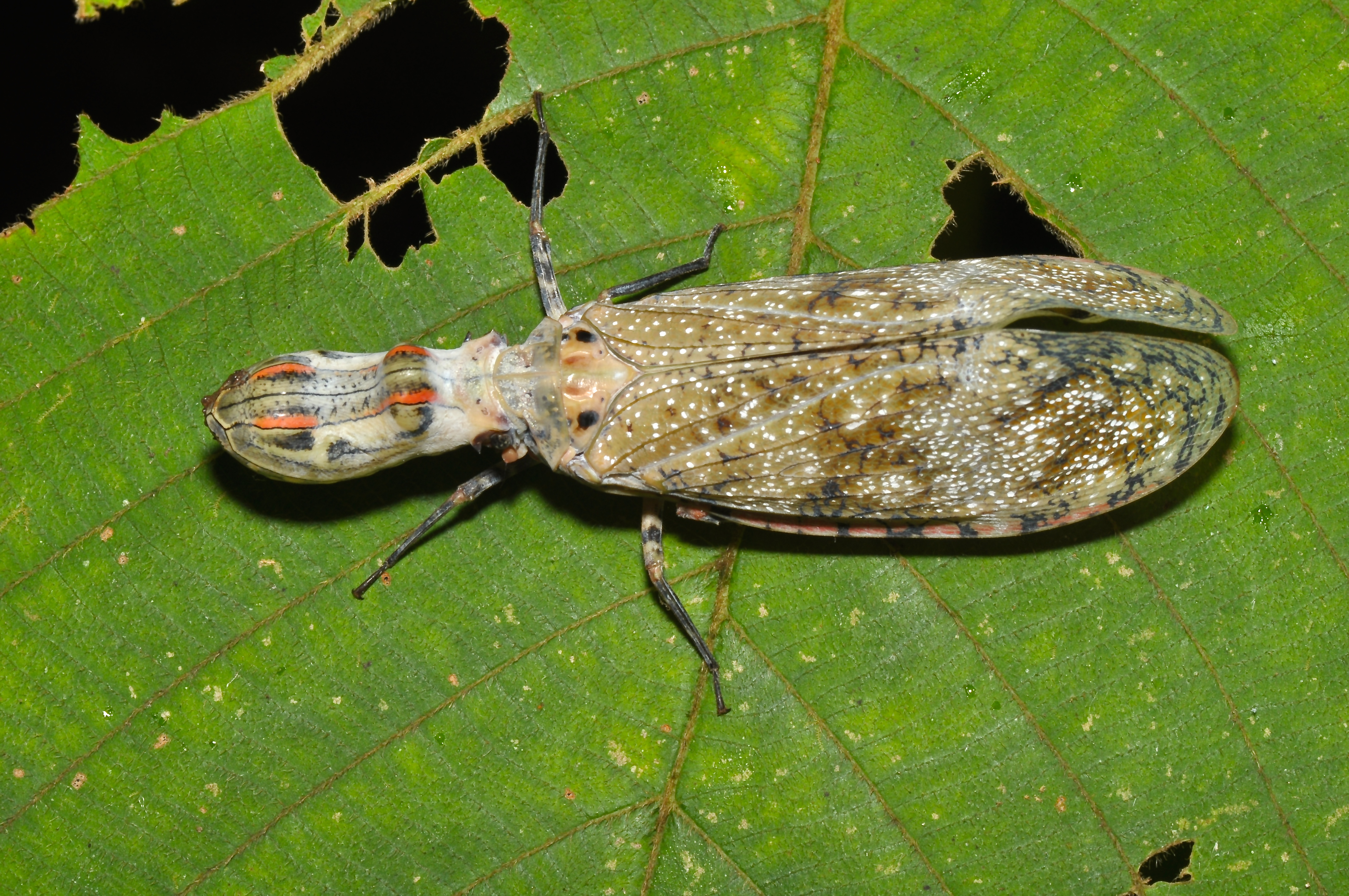
- Fulgora cf laternaria

Scientific classification
- Kingdom: Animalia
- Phylum: Arthropoda
- Class: Insecta
- Order: Hemiptera
- Suborder: Auchenorrhyncha
- Infraorder: Fulgoromorpha
- Family: Fulgoridae
- Subfamily: Fulgorinae; Latreille, 1807

Type genus
- Fulgora Linnaeus, 1767

= Fulgorinae =

Subfamily of true bugs

The Fulgorinae are a sub-family of insects in the Auchenorrhyncha: which include the spectacular "lantern-bugs" and allied insects.

== Tribes and genera ==
Nine genera are currently listed by the NCBI, but molecular studies question the placement of genera in the Zannini, even questioning whether they belong to the family Fulgoridae. There have until recently been two tribes placed within Fulgorinae, but recent research suggests that the tribe Pyropsini should instead be placed within the subfamily Aphaeninae (e.g.,), leaving only a single tribe, Fulgorini.

=== Fulgorini ===
Auth.: Latreille, 1807 (central and southern America)

subtribe Fulgorina Latreille, 1807

1. Cathedra Kirkaldy, 1903 monotypic: Cathedra serrata
2. Diareusa Walker, 1858
3. Fulgora Linné, 1767 (type genus)
4. Phrictus Spinola, 1839

subtribe Odontopterina Metcalf, 1938

1. Aphrodisias Kirkaldy, 1906
2. Odontoptera Carreno, 1841
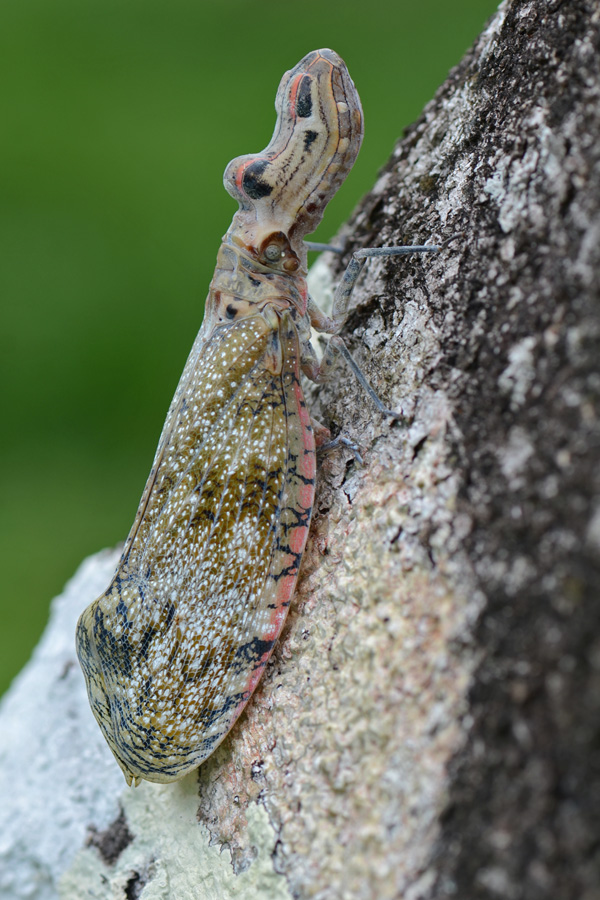
Fulgora sp.

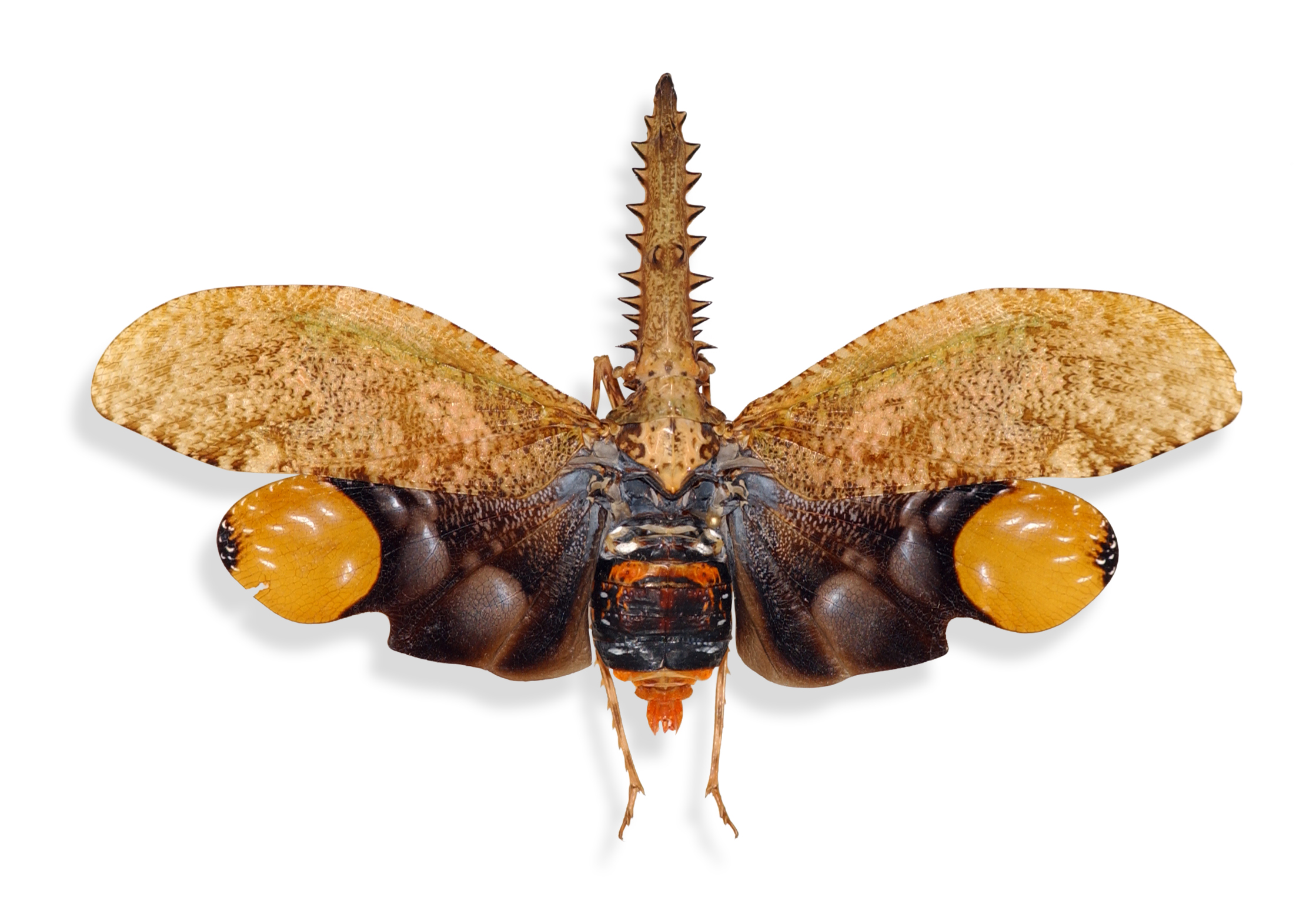
Cathedra serrata

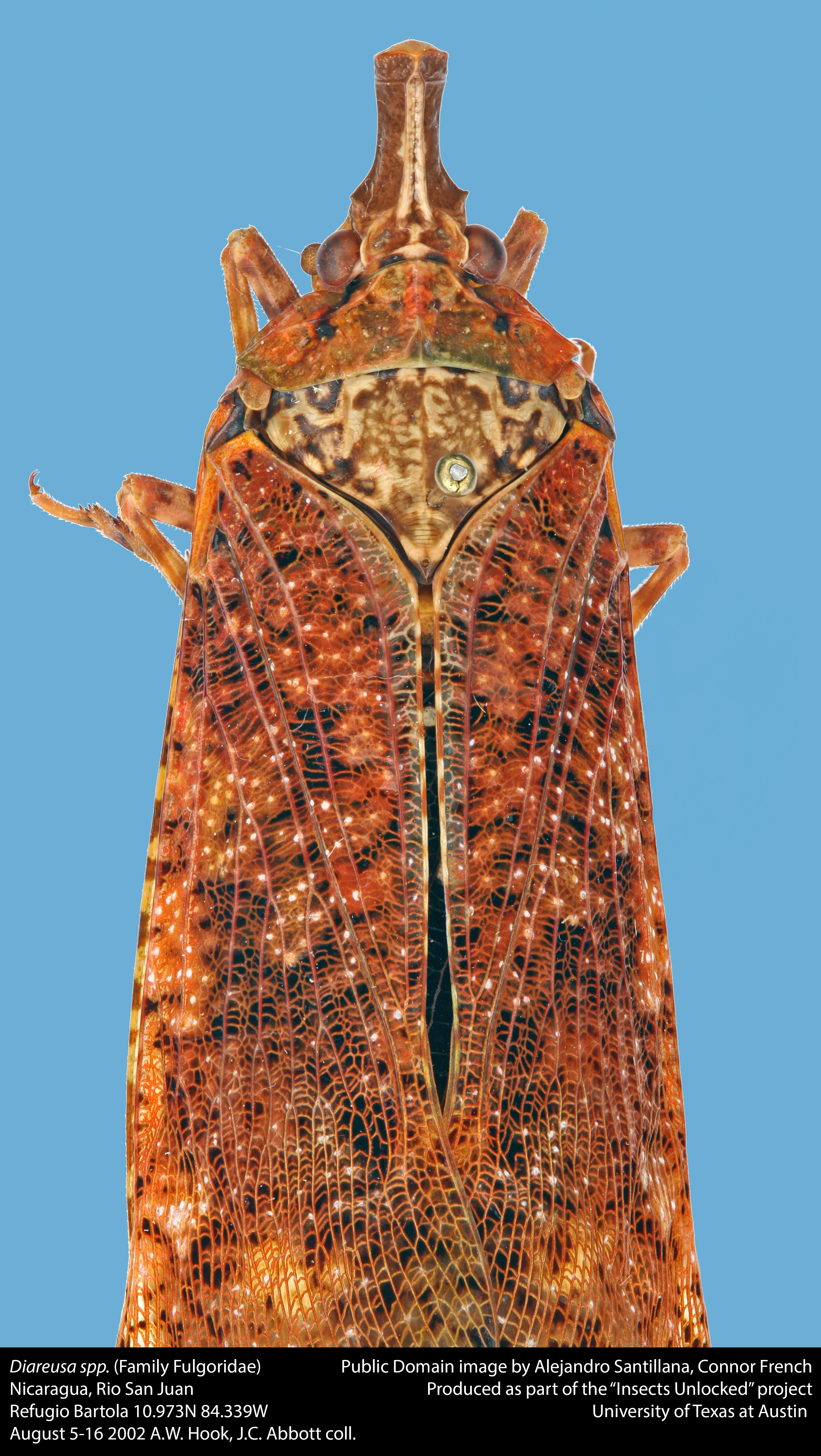
Diareusa sp.

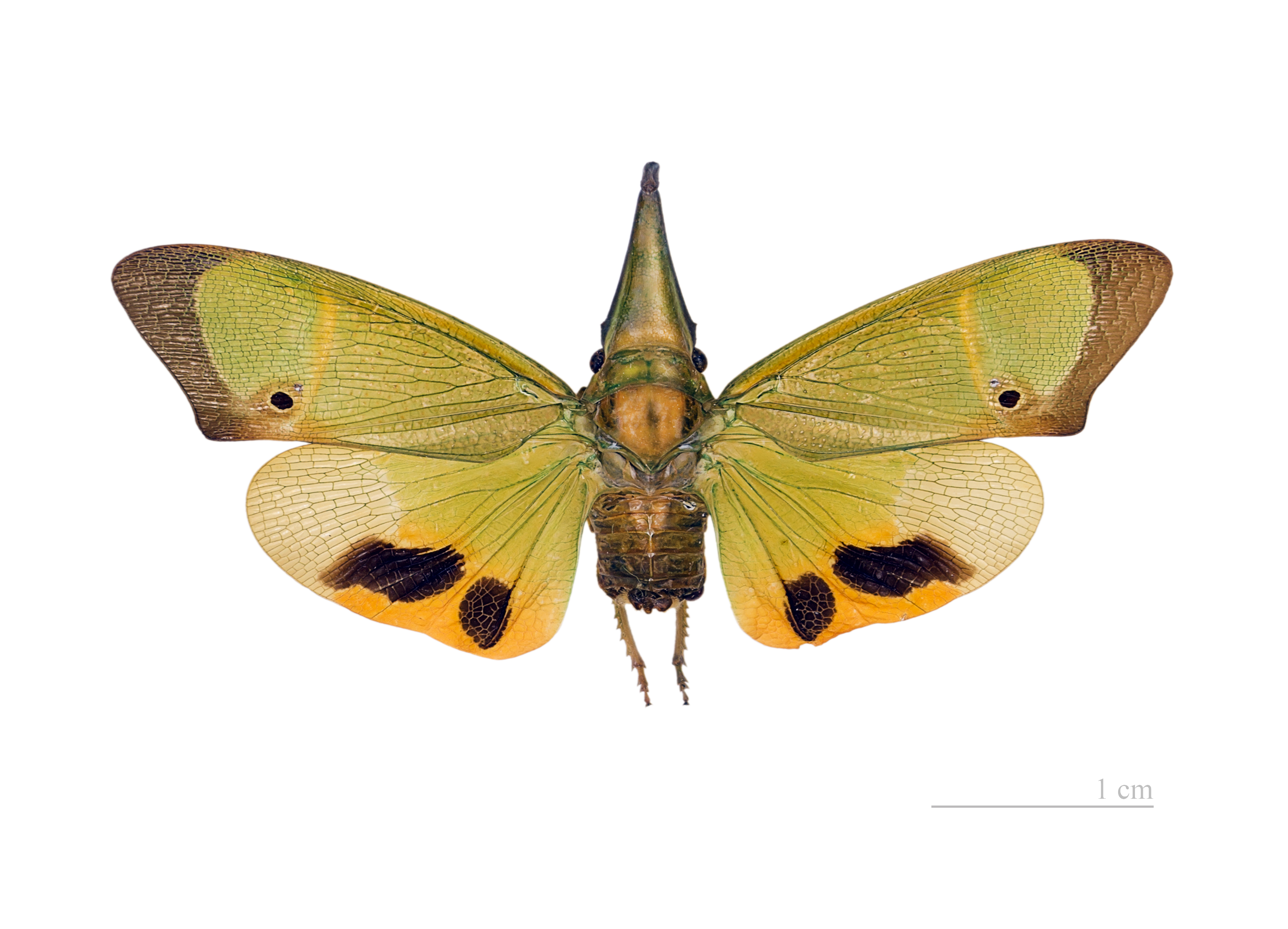
Odontoptera carrenoi

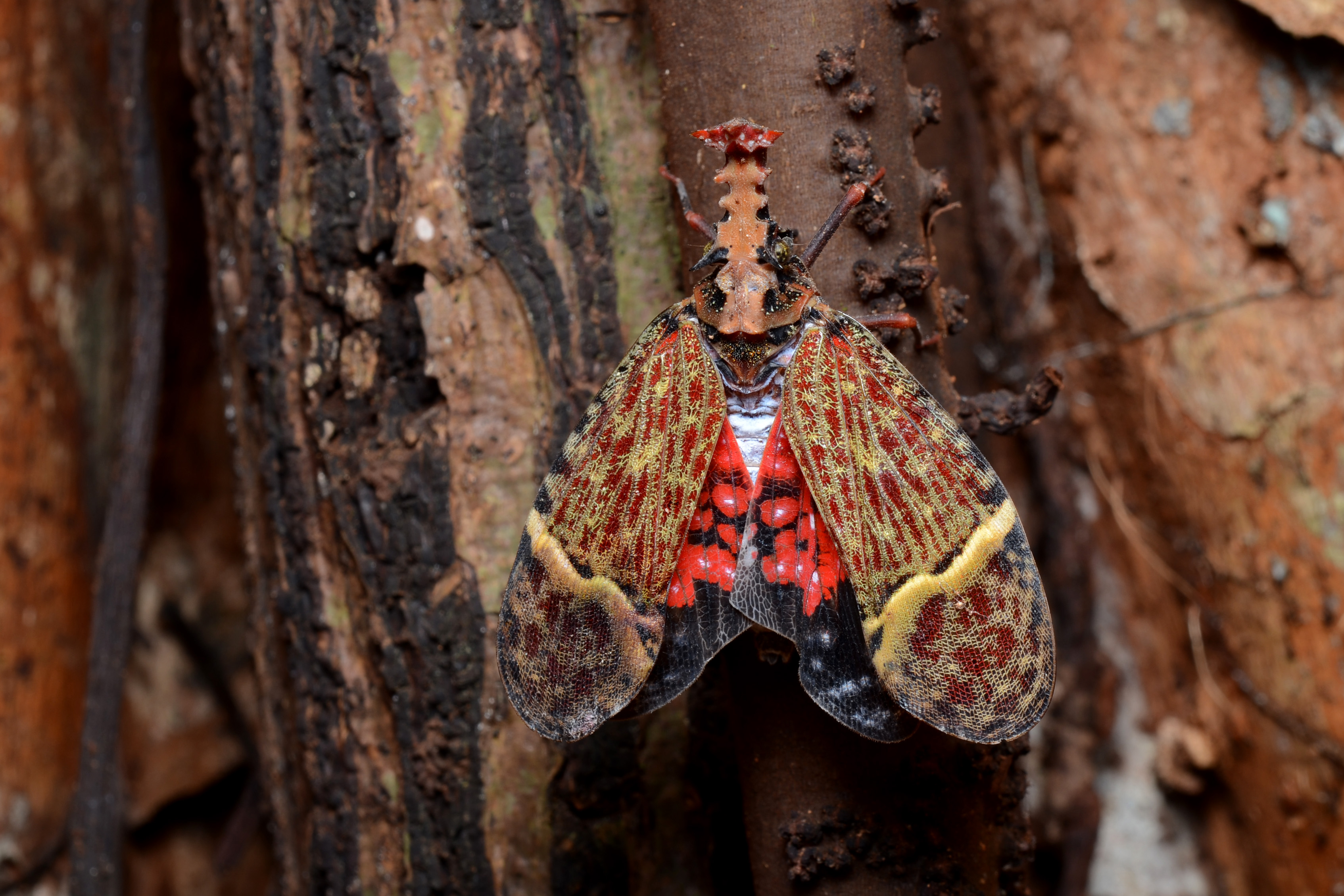
Phrictus quinqueparitus

== See also ==
- Data related to Fulgoridae at Wikispecies
- Media related to Fulgorinae at Wikimedia Commons
