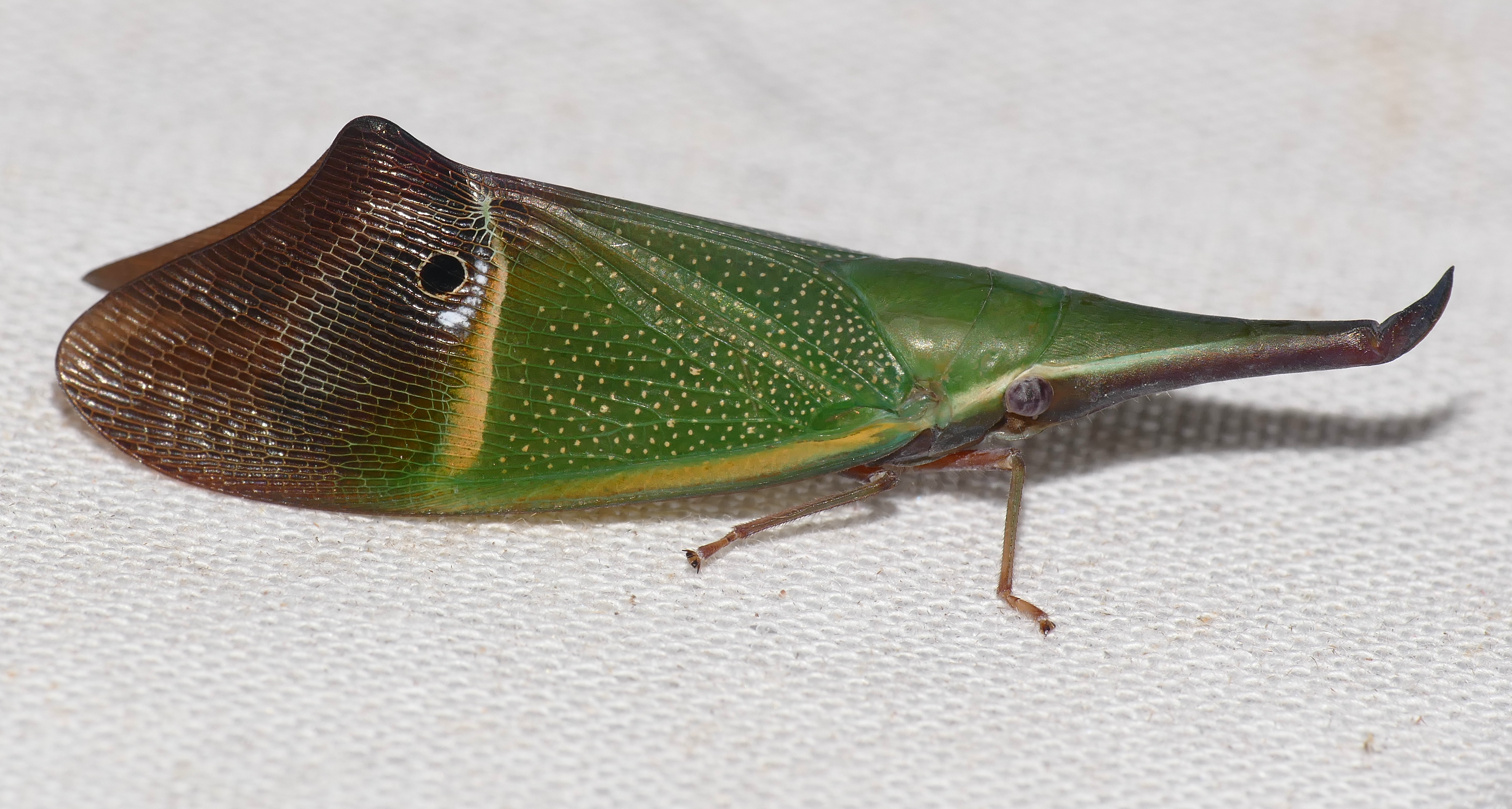

Scientific classification
- Domain: Eukaryota
- Kingdom: Animalia
- Phylum: Arthropoda
- Class: Insecta
- Order: Hemiptera
- Suborder: Auchenorrhyncha
- Infraorder: Fulgoromorpha
- Family: Fulgoridae
- Genus: Odontoptera
- Species: O. toulgoeti

Binomial name
- Odontoptera toulgoeti Bourgoin & O'Brien, 2004

= Odontoptera toulgoeti =

Species of planthopper

Odontoptera toulgoeti is a species of South American lanternfly.

== Identification ==
Like other Odontoptera, this species has a green body, an elongate cephalic process, and an apically oblique wing. It is distinguished from Odontoptera spectabilis by the cephalic process apically lifted, the eyespot on the tegmen distinct, the anal angle not falcate and the browning on the tegmen covering the entire apical third of tegmen but gradiented from the green basal two thirds. The last feature also distinguishes it from Odontoptera carrenoi.
