= Machaca (disambiguation) =

Machaca is a preparation of dried meat. Machaca may also refer to:

- Machaca (insect)
- Machaca (fish)
- Machaca (album)
