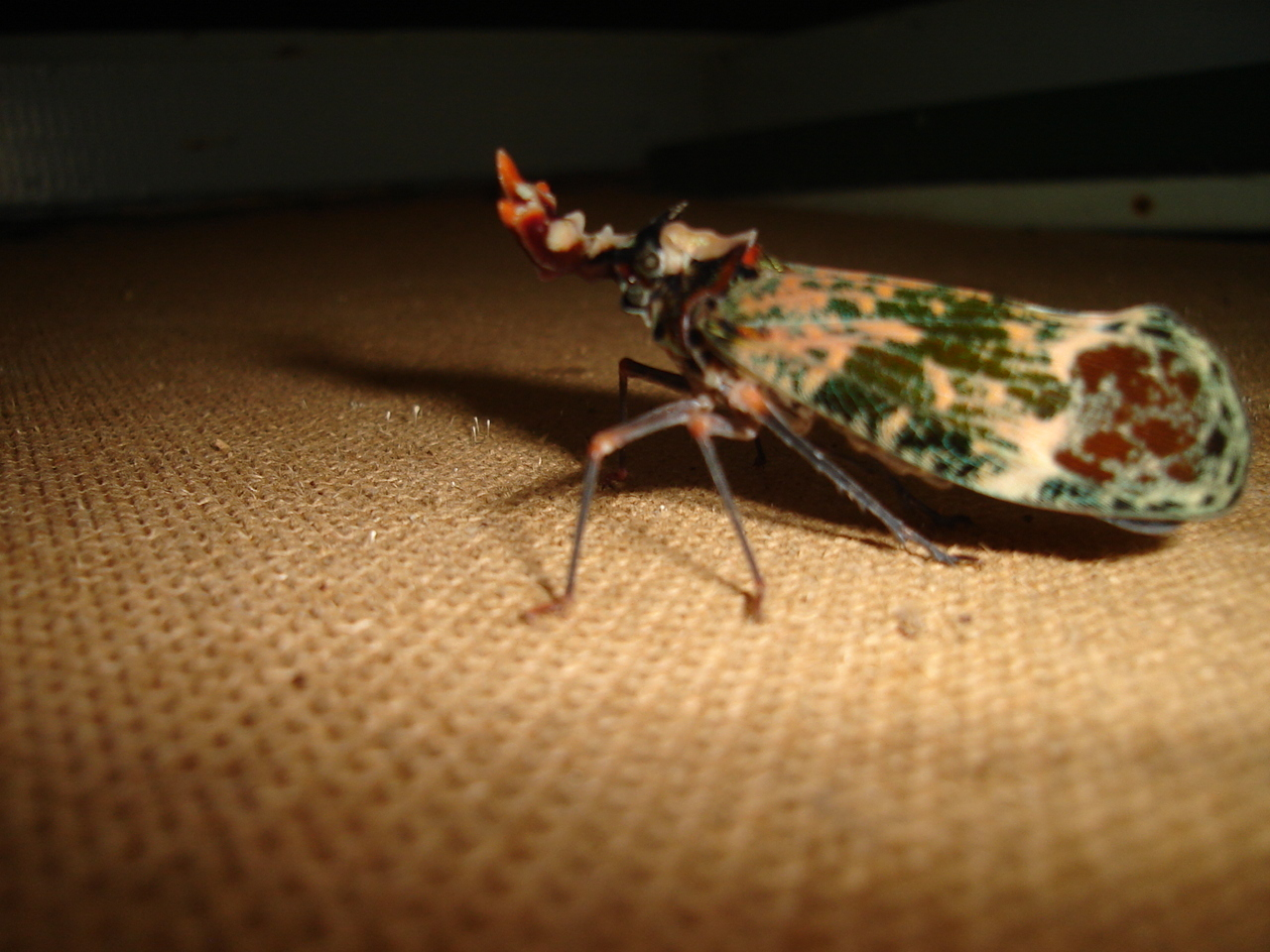

Scientific classification
- Domain: Eukaryota
- Kingdom: Animalia
- Phylum: Arthropoda
- Class: Insecta
- Order: Hemiptera
- Suborder: Auchenorrhyncha
- Infraorder: Fulgoromorpha
- Family: Fulgoridae
- Genus: Phrictus
- Species: P. regalis

Binomial name
- Phrictus regalis Caldwell, 1945

= Phrictus regalis =

Species of planthooper

Phrictus regalis is a species of insect from the genus Phrictus.
