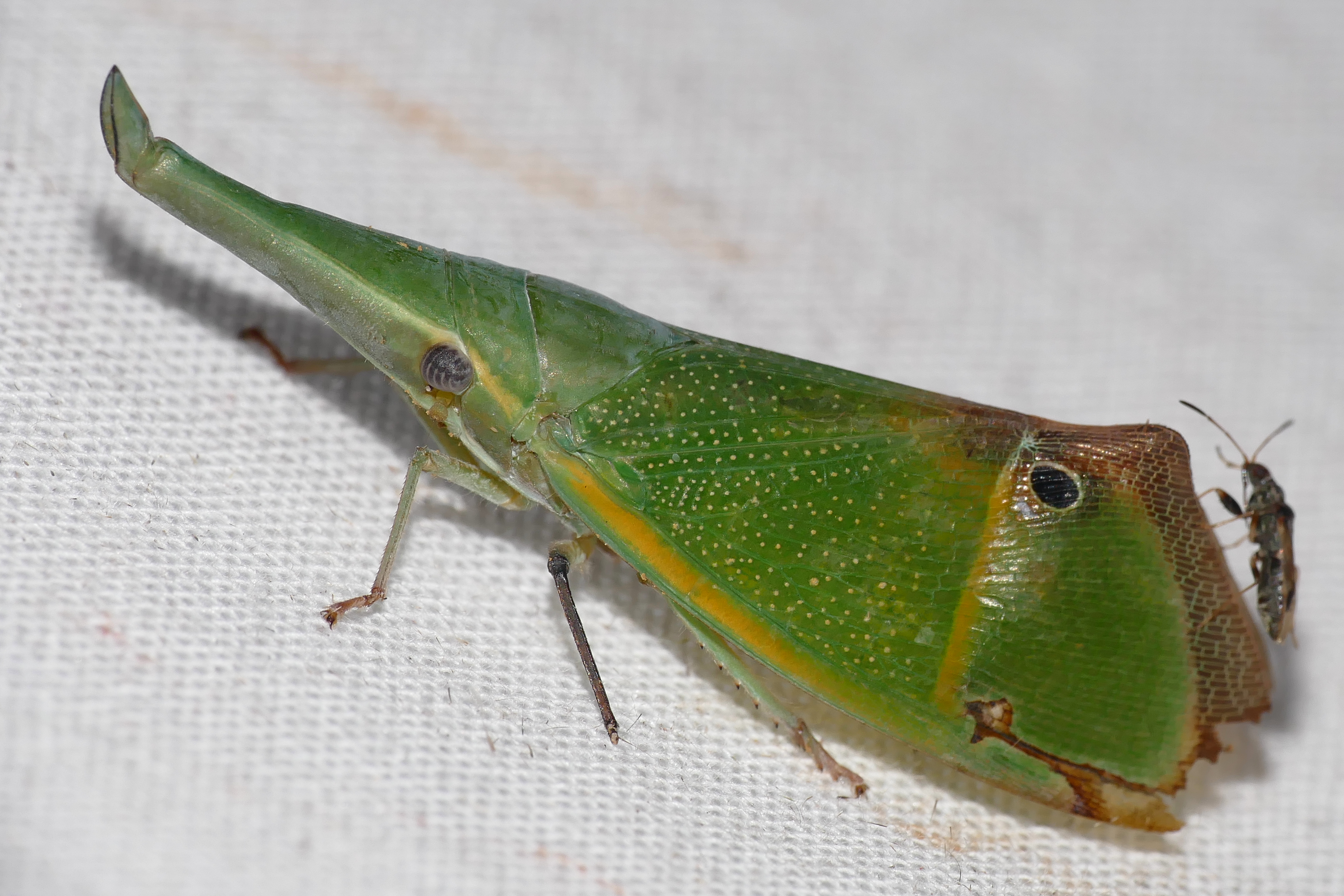

Scientific classification
- Kingdom: Animalia
- Phylum: Arthropoda
- Clade: Pancrustacea
- Class: Insecta
- Order: Hemiptera
- Suborder: Auchenorrhyncha
- Infraorder: Fulgoromorpha
- Family: Fulgoridae
- Genus: Odontoptera
- Species: O. carrenoi

Binomial name
- Odontoptera carrenoi Signoret, 1849

Synonyms
- Odontoptera carenoi Signoret, 1849; Odontoptera carrenonis Signoret, 1849; Odontoptera carrenoi intermedia Bourgoin & O'Brien, 1994

= Odontoptera carrenoi =

Species of planthoppers

Odontoptera carrenoi is a species lanternfly found in Central and South America.

== Identification ==
Like other Odontoptera, this species has a green body, an elongate cephalic process, and an apically oblique wing. Distinguished from Odontoptera spectabilis by the cephalic process apically lifted, the eyespot on the tegmen distinct, the anal angle not falcate and the browning on the tegmen limited to margins. The last feature also distinguishes it from Odontoptera toulgoeti.
