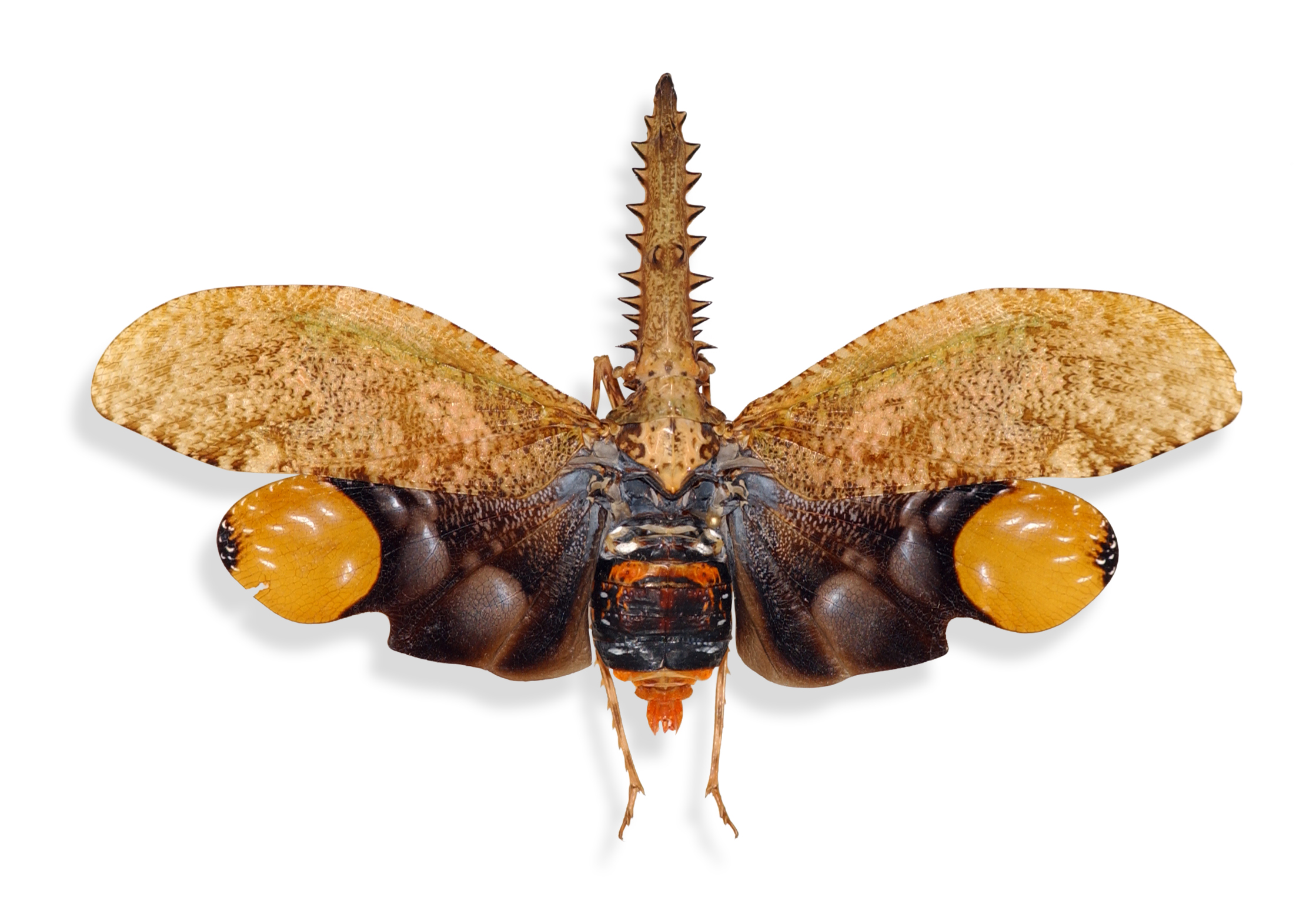

Scientific classification
- Kingdom: Animalia
- Phylum: Arthropoda
- Clade: Pancrustacea
- Class: Insecta
- Order: Hemiptera
- Suborder: Auchenorrhyncha
- Infraorder: Fulgoromorpha
- Family: Fulgoridae
- Subfamily: Fulgorinae
- Tribe: Fulgorini
- Genus: Cathedra; Kirkaldy, 1903
- Species: C. serrata

Binomial name
- Cathedra serrata (Fabricius, 1781)

Synonyms
- Fulgora serrata Fabricius, 1781; Phrictus serratus (Fabricius, 1781)

= Cathedra serrata =

Species of planthopper

Cathedra serrata is a species of planthopper in the monotypic genus Cathedra, recorded from Ecuador and Suriname; the Catalogue of Life does not list any subspecies.

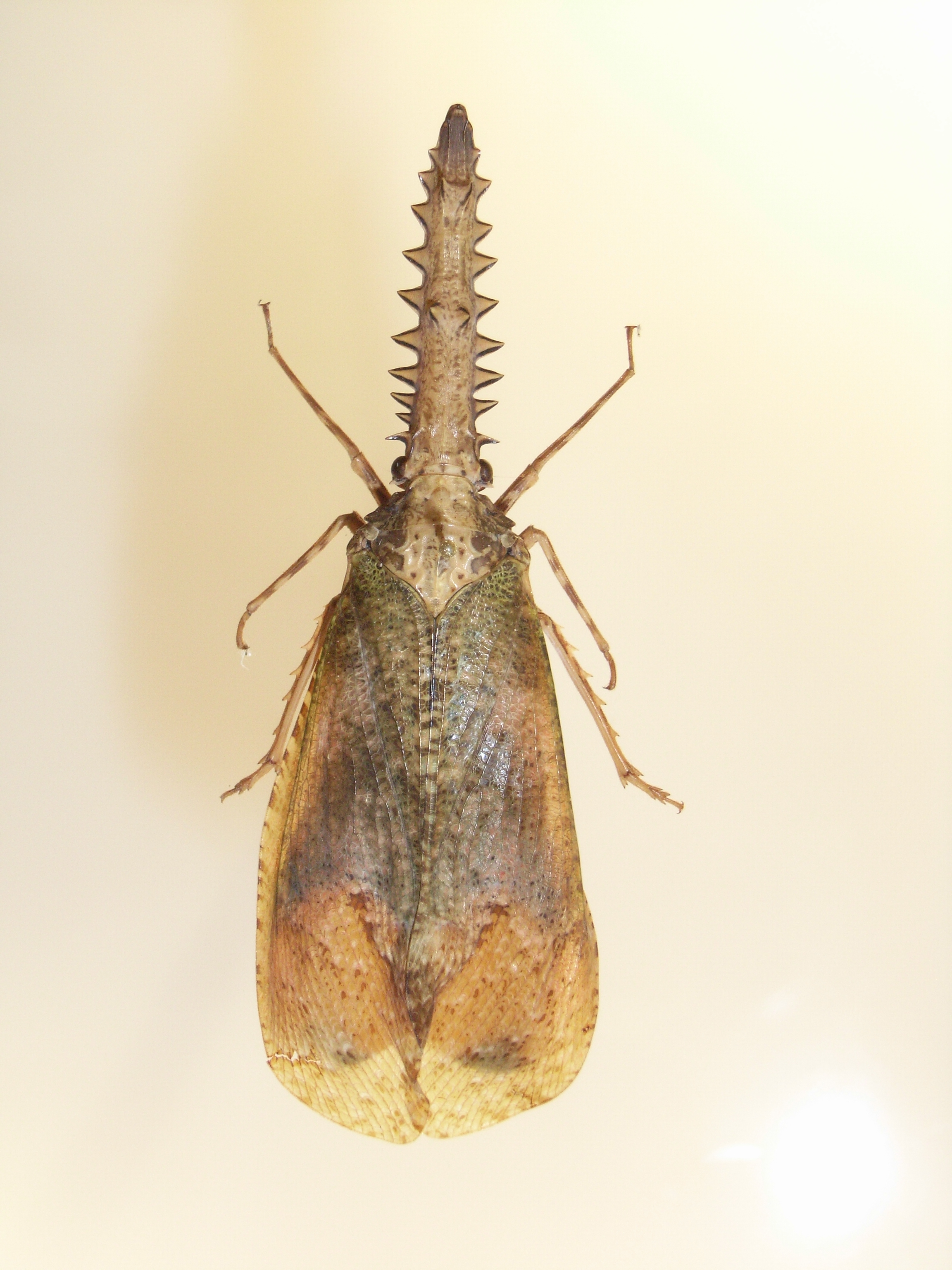
