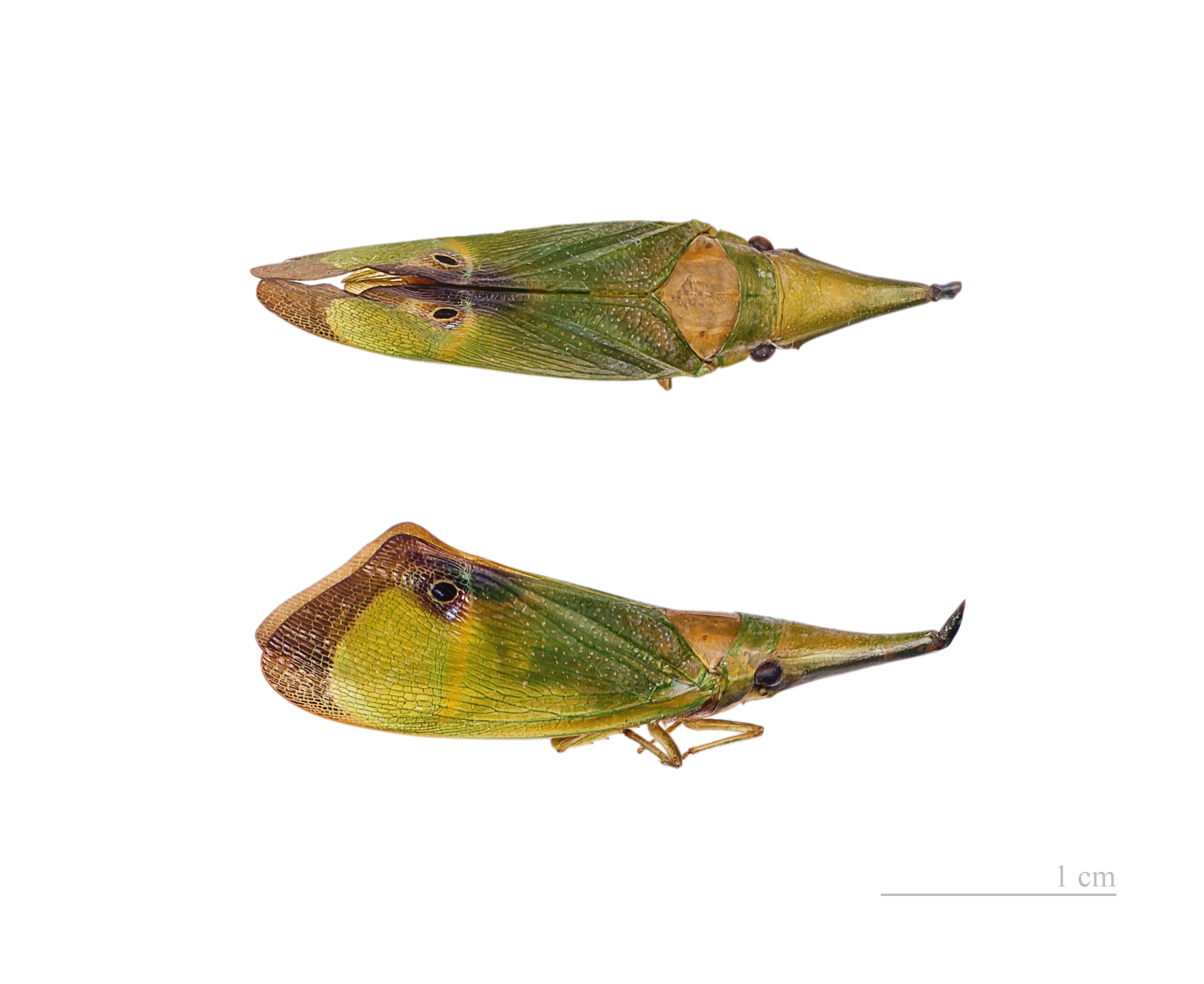
- Odontoptera carrenoi (Toulouse Museum)

Scientific classification
- Domain: Eukaryota
- Kingdom: Animalia
- Phylum: Arthropoda
- Class: Insecta
- Order: Hemiptera
- Suborder: Auchenorrhyncha
- Infraorder: Fulgoromorpha
- Family: Fulgoridae
- Subfamily: Fulgorinae
- Tribe: Fulgorini
- Genus: Odontoptera; Carreno, 1841

= Odontoptera =

Genus of planthoppers

Odontoptera is a genus of planthoppers in the family Fulgoridae and tribe Fulgorini: from Central and South America.

== Species ==
The following species are listed:

1. Odontoptera carrenoi (Signoret, 1849)
2. Odontoptera spectabilis (Carreno, 1841), (type species)
3. Odontoptera toulgoeti (Bourgoin & O'Brien, 1994)

== Gallery ==
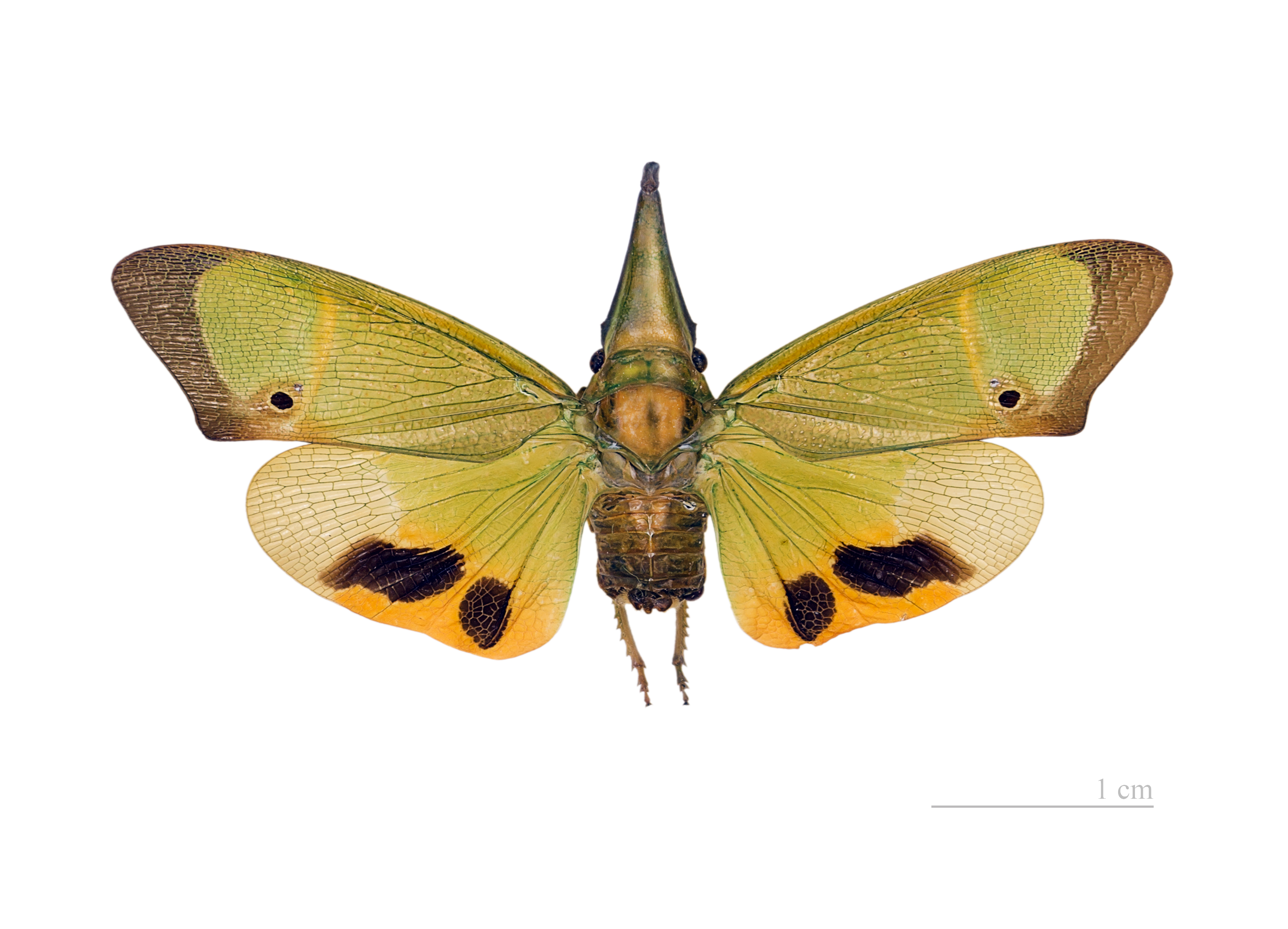
O. carrenoi (Toulouse Museum)

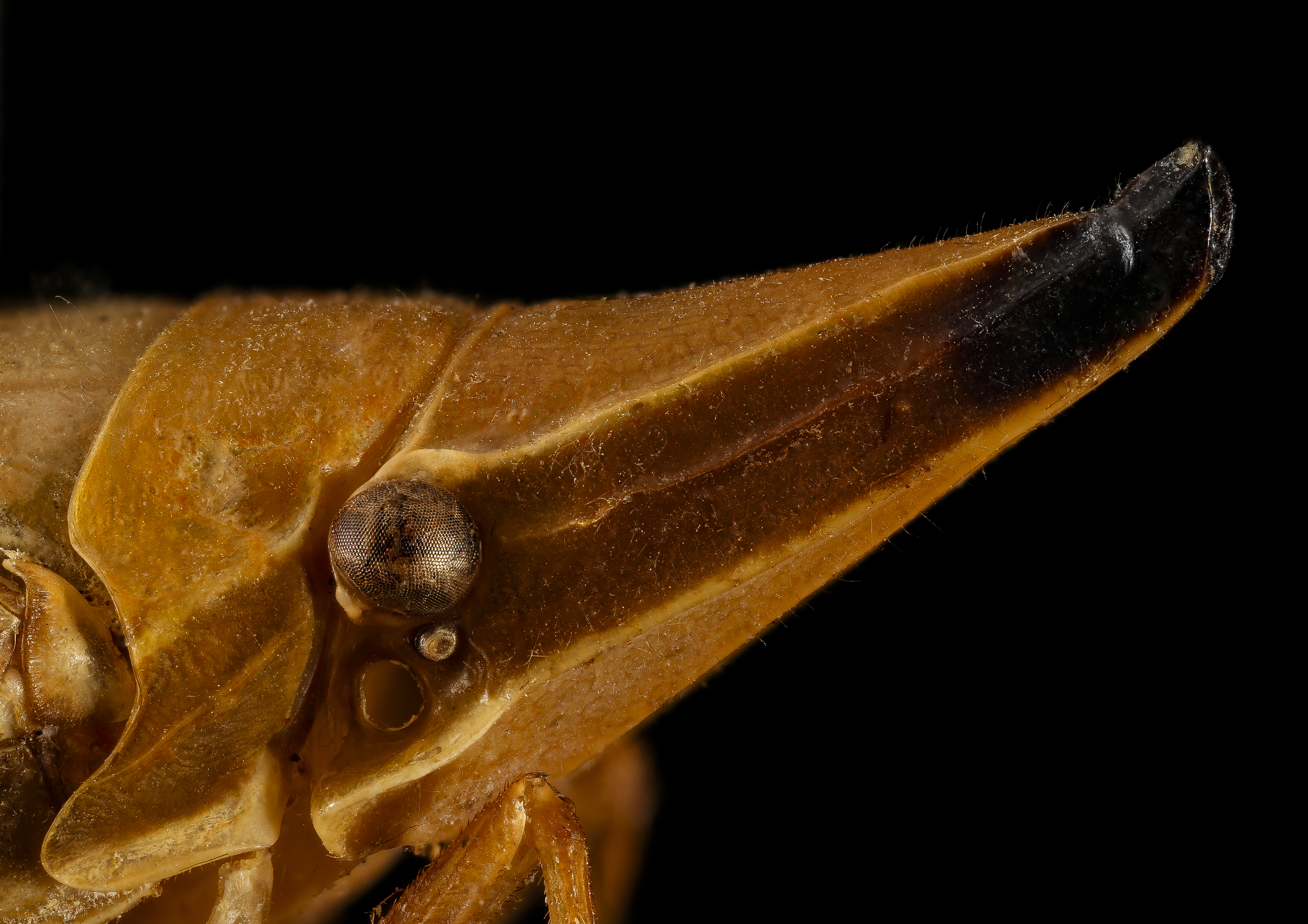
O. spectabilis, Paraguay
