= Aphrodisias (planthopper) =

Scientific classification
- Domain: Eukaryota
- Kingdom: Animalia
- Phylum: Arthropoda
- Class: Insecta
- Order: Hemiptera
- Suborder: Auchenorrhyncha
- Infraorder: Fulgoromorpha
- Family: Fulgoridae
- Subfamily: Fulgorinae
- Tribe: Fulgorini
- Genus: Aphrodisias; Kirkaldy, 1906

Genus of planthoppers

External image
- Images at iNaturalist

Aphrodisias is a Central American genus of planthoppers in the family Fulgoridae and tribe Fulgorini.

== Species ==
Fulgoromorpha Lists On the Web includes:

1. Aphrodisias cacica Stål, 1869 - type species
2. Aphrodisias shaman O'Brien, 1991
