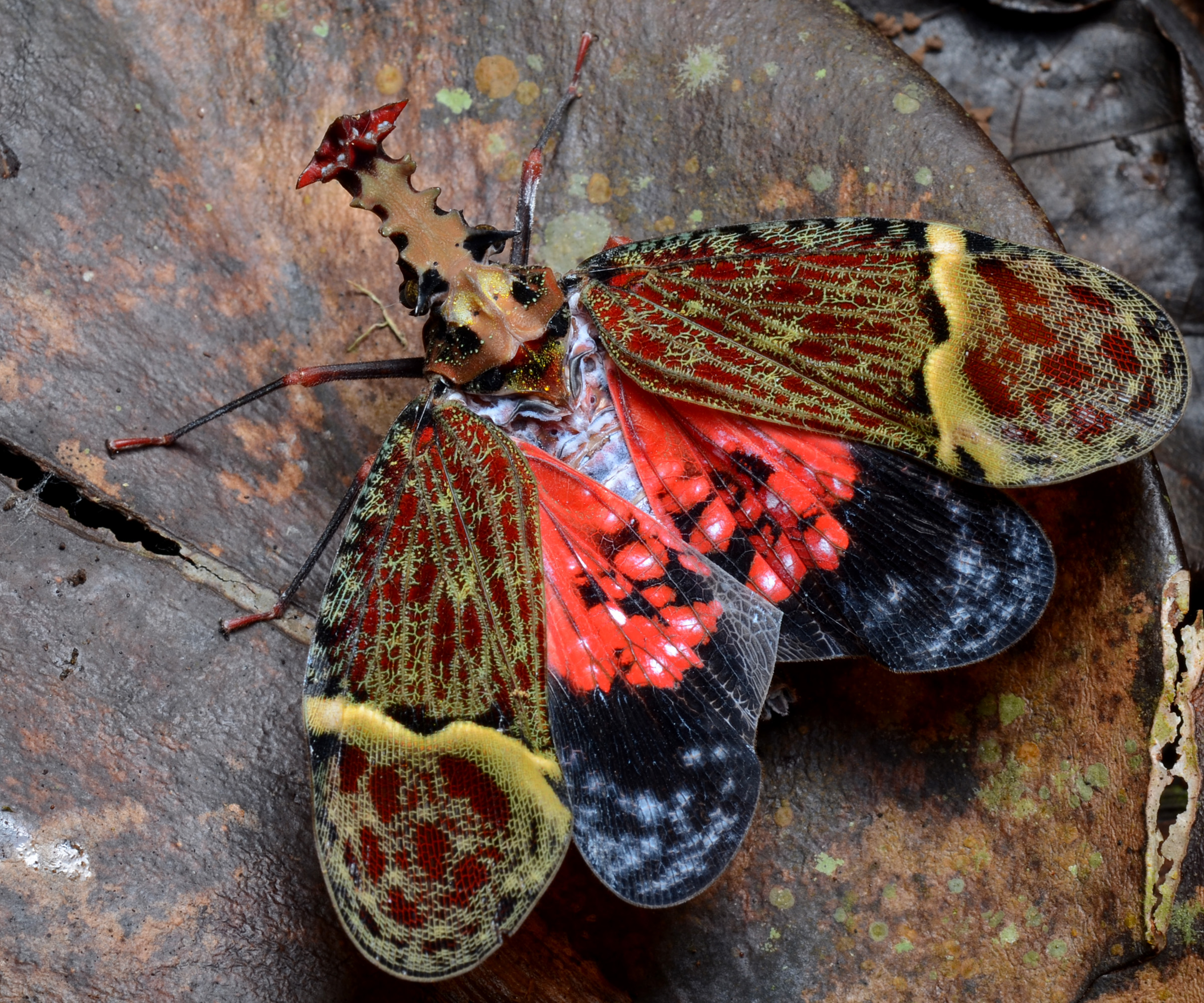

Scientific classification
- Domain: Eukaryota
- Kingdom: Animalia
- Phylum: Arthropoda
- Class: Insecta
- Order: Hemiptera
- Suborder: Auchenorrhyncha
- Infraorder: Fulgoromorpha
- Family: Fulgoridae
- Genus: Phrictus
- Species: P. quinquepartitus

Binomial name
- Phrictus quinquepartitus Distant, 1883

= Phrictus quinquepartitus =

Species of true bug

Phrictus quinquepartitus, also known as the wart-headed bug and the dragon-headed bug, is an insect belonging to the family Fulgoridae. They were described by English entomologist William Lucas Distant in 1883. They are found in Costa Rica, Panama, Colombia, and parts of Brazil.

== Description ==
P. quinquepartitus averages 5.5 centimetres (2.2 in) in length. They have brightly colored hind wings and forewings with distinctive markings. Their source of nourishment is tree sap, which they ingest using a tube-like organ in place of a mouth.

The species name is occasionally seen misspelled Phrictus quinqueparitus.

== Identification ==
Phrictus quinquepartitus belongs to a group of three species: itself, Phrictus tripartitus and Phrictus buechei. They all have the distinct band at 2/3rds of the tegmen pale yellow or peach, uninterrupted, uniformly thick, undulate, and distinctly bifurcating near the sutral margin.The three species can be differentiated with the following key:

1. The tegmen green, hindwing basally yellow, and the cephalic process apically yellow ... Phrictus buechei

-. The tegmen red, hindwing basally red and the cephalic process apically red ... See 2

2. The cephalic process apically trifurcating ... Phrictus tripartitus

-. The cephalic process apically pentafurcating (trifurcating with two furcations extra, smaller, one in each space between the three large furcations ... Phrictus quinquepartitus
