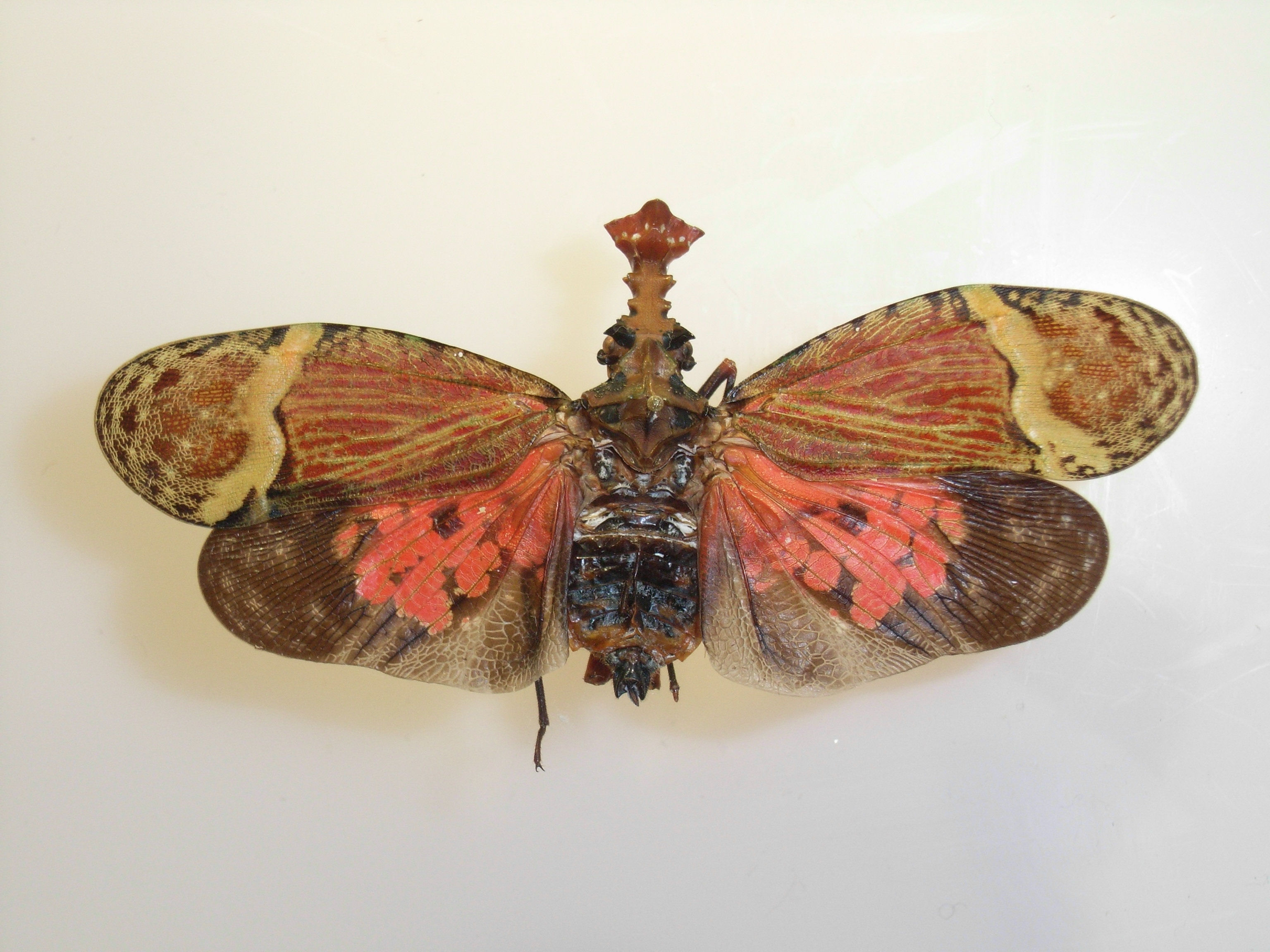
- Phrictus tripartitus

Scientific classification
- Domain: Eukaryota
- Kingdom: Animalia
- Phylum: Arthropoda
- Class: Insecta
- Order: Hemiptera
- Suborder: Auchenorrhyncha
- Infraorder: Fulgoromorpha
- Family: Fulgoridae
- Subfamily: Fulgorinae
- Tribe: Fulgorini
- Subtribe: Fulgorina
- Genus: Phrictus; Spinola, 1839

= Phrictus =

Genus of planthoppers

Phrictus is a genus of bugs in the subfamily Fulgorinae and tribe Fulgorini, erected by Maximilian Spinola in 1839. They are sometimes called "dragon-headed bugs" and species have been recorded from central and South America.

== Species ==
Fulgoromorpha Lists On the Web includes:

1. Phrictus auromaculatus Distant, 1905
2. Phrictus buechei Bourgoin & Arnaud, 2004
3. Phrictus delicatus O'Brien, 1991
4. Phrictus diadema (Linné, 1767) - type species
5. Phrictus diligens O'Brien, 1991
6. Phrictus hoffmannsi Schmidt, 1905
7. Phrictus minutacanthis Caldwell, 1945
8. Phrictus moebiusi Schmidt, 1905
9. Phrictus notatus Lallemand, 1931
10. Phrictus ocellatus Signoret, 1855
11. Phrictus punctatus Caldwell, 1945
12. Phrictus quinquepartitus Distant, 1883
13. Phrictus regalis Caldwell, 1945
14. Phrictus sordidus Caldwell, 1945
15. Phrictus tripartitus Metcalf, 1938
16. Phrictus xanthopterus Schmidt, 1910
