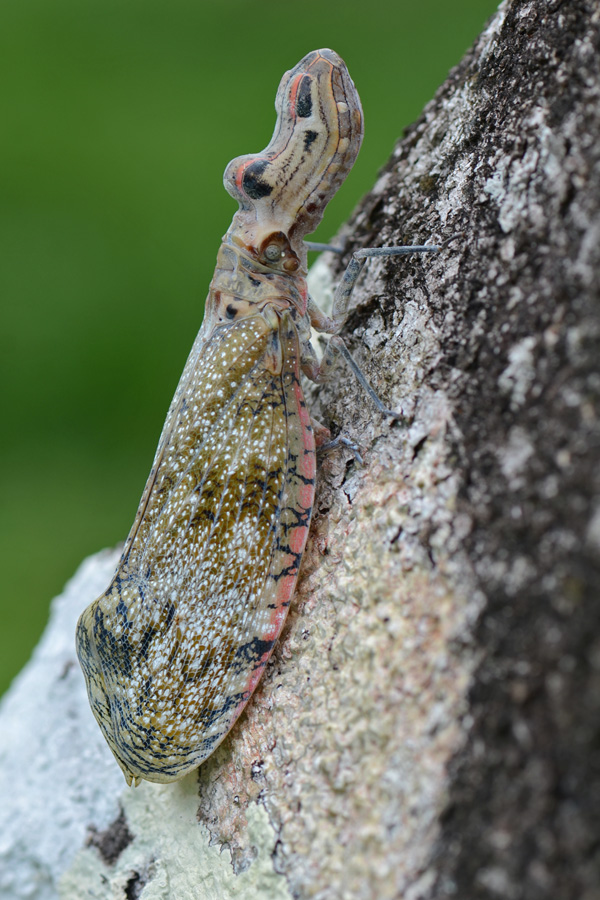
- Fulgora sp.

Scientific classification
- Domain: Eukaryota
- Kingdom: Animalia
- Phylum: Arthropoda
- Class: Insecta
- Order: Hemiptera
- Suborder: Auchenorrhyncha
- Infraorder: Fulgoromorpha
- Family: Fulgoridae
- Tribe: Fulgorini
- Genus: Fulgora; Linnaeus, 1767

= Fulgora =

Genus of planthoppers

The fulgorid genus Fulgora contains several large Central and South American planthoppers known by a large variety of common names including lantern fly, peanut bug, peanut-headed lanternfly, alligator bug, machaca, and jequitiranaboia (the latter terms used in the Amazon region and elsewhere in Brazil).

== Species ==
Species are mostly similar in appearance, with differences in the shape of the head (often quite subtle), and patterns of wing coloration; there is some confusion regarding the validity of some of the currently recognised species. Some individuals can measure up to 75 mm (3 inches). The type species of Fulgora is Cicada laternaria Linnaeus 1758, designated under the Plenary Powers by ICZN (1954: 185); now Fulgora laternaria, it is the most well-known and widespread species.

Fulgoromorpha Lists On the Web includes:

1. Fulgora caerulescens Olivier, 1791
2. Fulgora castresii Guérin-Méneville, 1837
3. Fulgora cearensis (Da Fonseca, 1932)
4. Fulgora graciliceps Blanchard, 1849
5. †Fulgora granulosa Scudder, 1878
6. Fulgora lampetis Burmeister, 1845
7. Fulgora laternaria (Linné, 1758) - type species
8. Fulgora lucifera Germar, 1821
9. †Fulgora obticescens Scudder, 1890
10. Fulgora orthocephala (Da Fonseca, 1926)
11. †Fulgora populata Scudder, 1890

=== Similar species ===
Old World species previously assigned to this genus include the Asian genus Pyrops and at least two southern African spp. incertae sedis:

- "Fulgora coerulescens" Olivier, 1791
- "Fulgora coccinea" Olivier, 1791
- "Fulgora limbata" Olivier, 1791

== Gallery ==
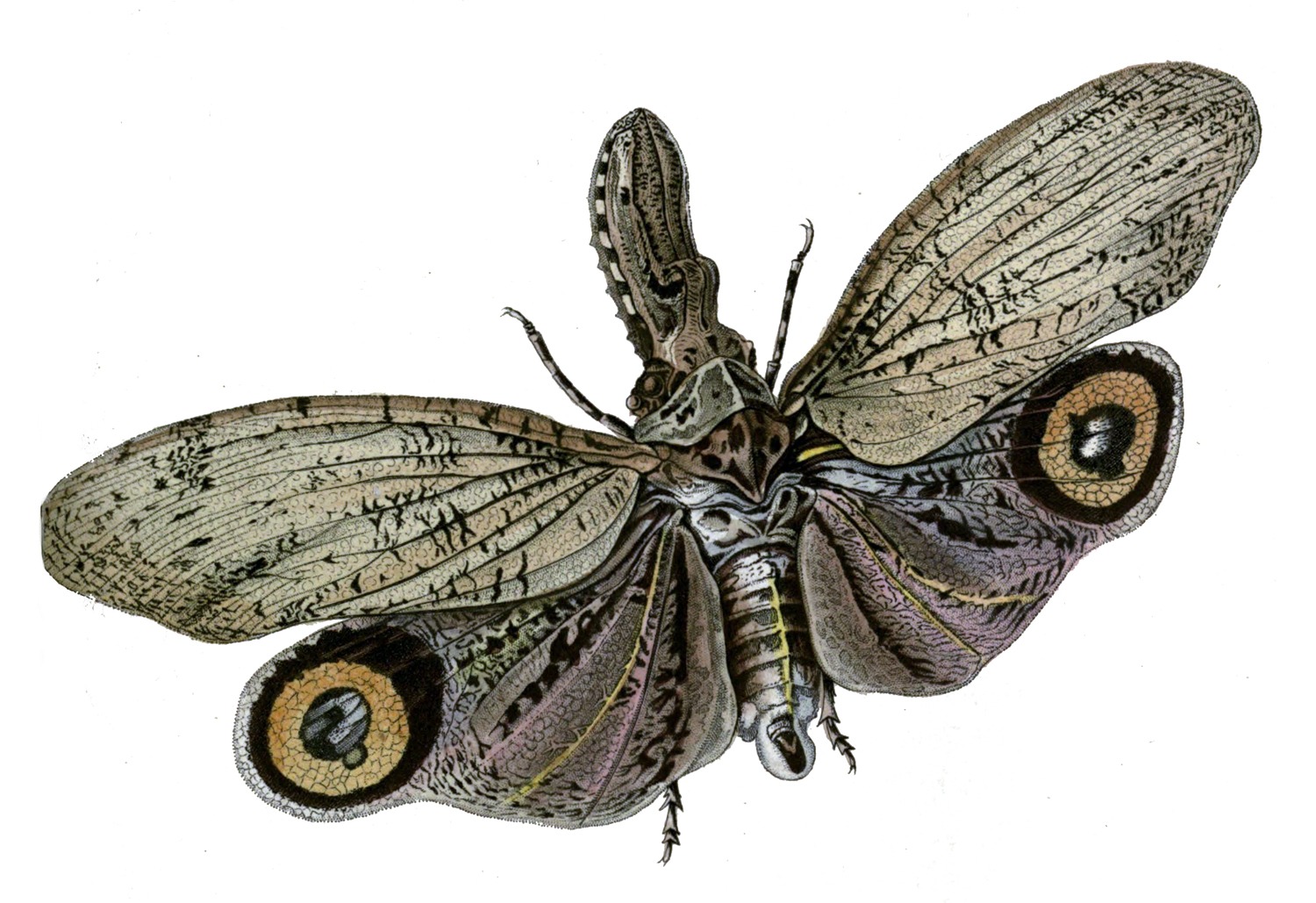
Fulgora castresii

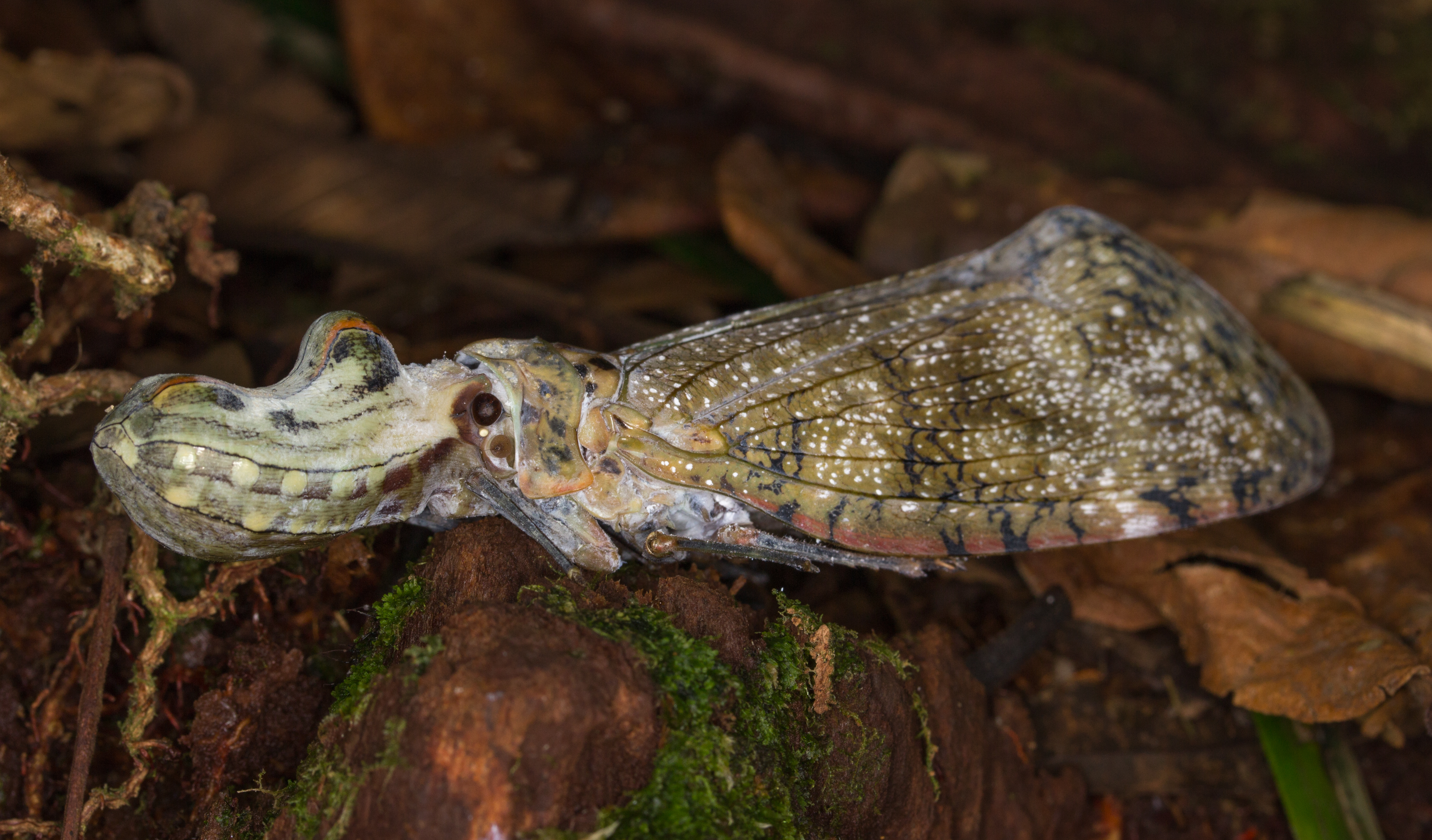
Fulgora lampetis

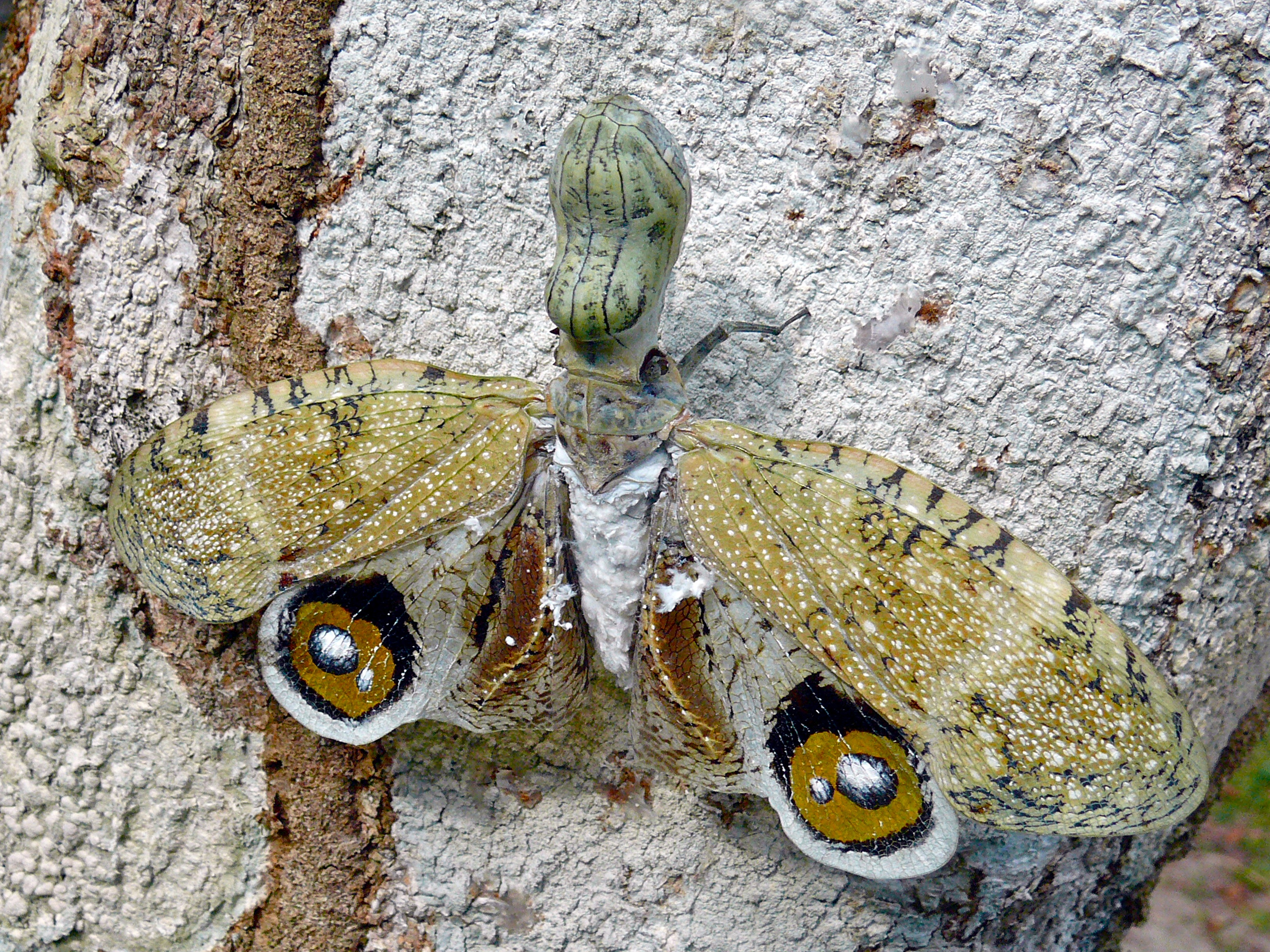
Fulgora laternaria

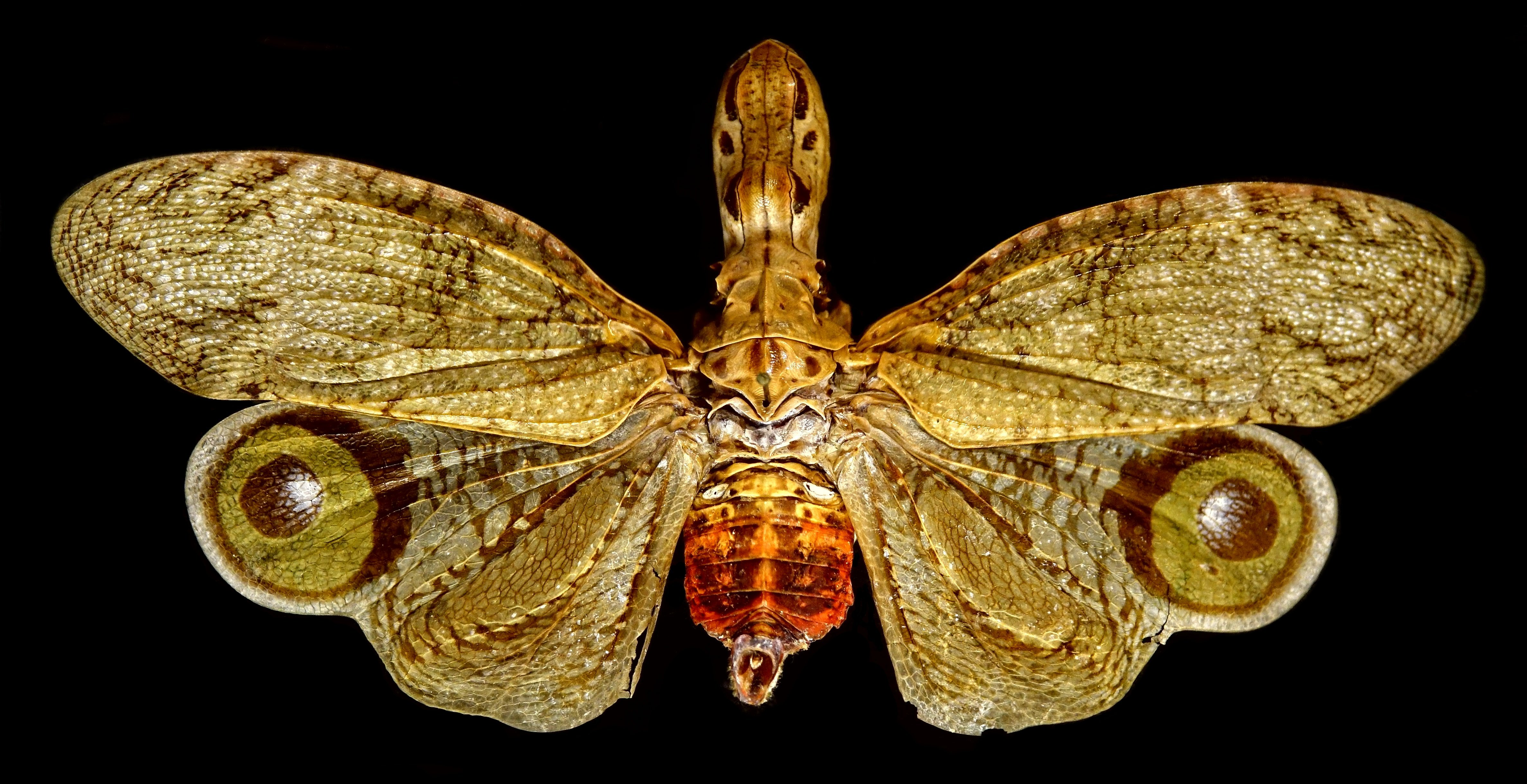
Fulgora lampetis - museum specimen
