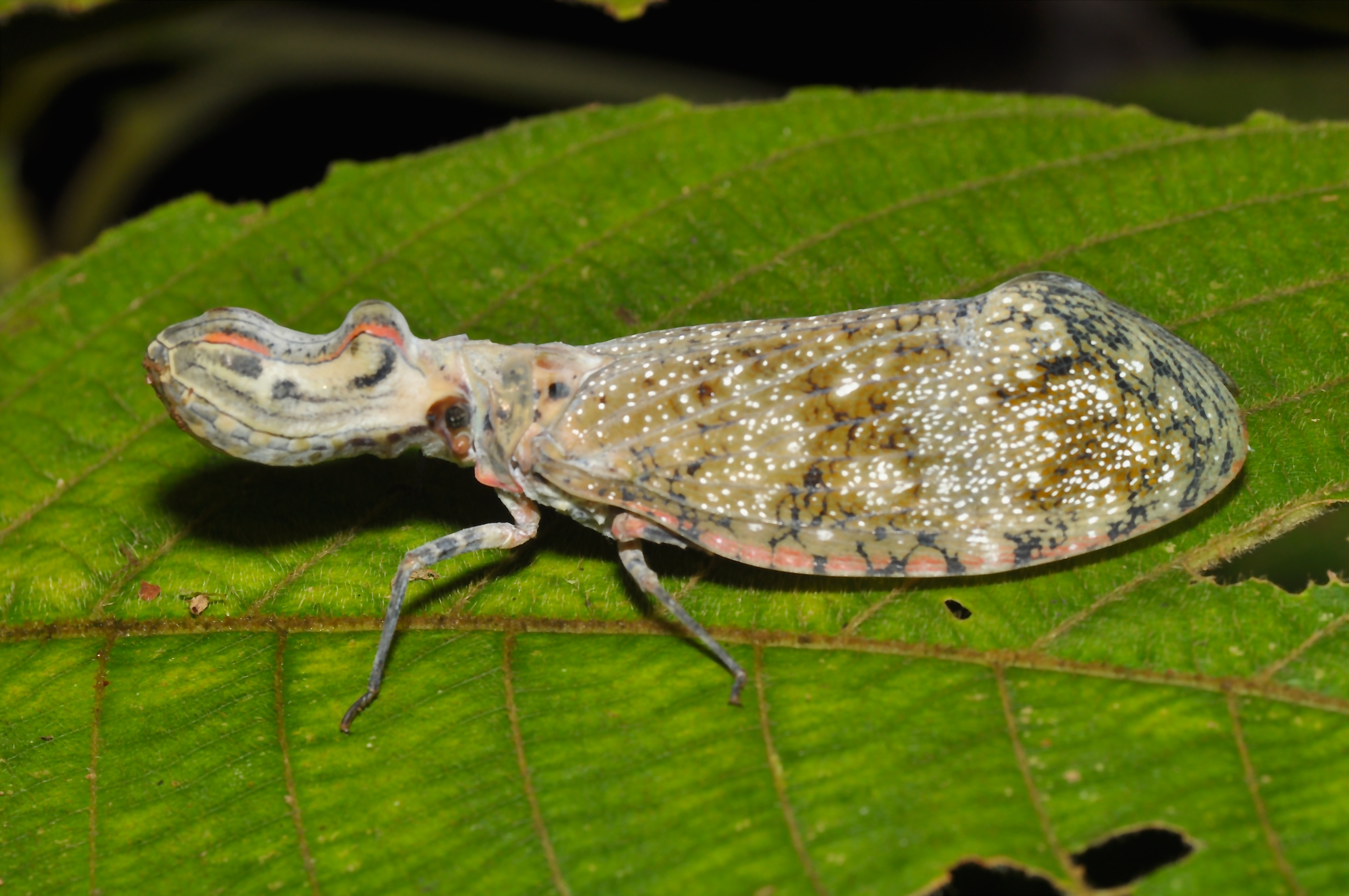
- Fulgora laternaria

Scientific classification
- Kingdom: Animalia
- Phylum: Arthropoda
- Clade: Pancrustacea
- Class: Insecta
- Order: Hemiptera
- Suborder: Auchenorrhyncha
- Infraorder: Fulgoromorpha
- Family: Fulgoridae
- Genus: Fulgora
- Species: F. laternaria

Binomial name
- Fulgora laternaria (Linnaeus, 1758)

Synonyms
- Cicada laternaria Linnaeus, 1758; Laternaria phosphorea Linnaeus, 1764; Fulgora lanternaria Donovan, 1797 (Missp.)

= Fulgora laternaria =

Species of true bug

Fulgora laternaria (often misspelled "lanternaria") is a species of Neotropical fulgorid planthopper. It is known by a large variety of common names, among them lantern fly, peanut bug, peanut-headed lanternfly, alligator bug, jequitiranaboia, machaca, chicharra-machacuy, and cocoposa.

== Description ==
Fulgora laternaria can reach a length of 85–90 millimetres (3.3–3.5 in), with a wingspan up to 100–150 millimetres (3.9–5.9 in). This insect has a protuberance at its head as long as 10–15 millimetres (0.39–0.59 in), looking like a peanut and showing false eyes to resemble that of a lizard or a serpent. The insect was originally - and mistakenly - believed to be luminescent. When attacked, it protects itself by displaying large, yellow, fake eyes on its hind wings to frighten the aggressor, and releases a foul-smelling substance. Adults can be found from June to December. They feed on the sap of plants, mainly from some trees as Hymenaea courbaril, Simarouba amara and Zanthoxylum species. It will generally remain camouflaged on a tree trunk during the day.

It will knock its head on a hollow tree to create vibrations for mates. It will lay its eggs on the Hymenaea courbaril or guapinol tree, and coat them in a waxy substance for protection.

Several very similar species in the genus occur from Central to South America, and many museum and commercial specimens identified as laternaria are actually other species.

== Distribution and habitat ==
This species inhabits tropical forests in Mexico, Central America and South America.

== History ==
In the 1970s, a Colombian reporter on a trip to Putumayo Department wrote a chronicle about this insect, and related the folk tale that if it bites you, it would cause death unless the affected person practiced a sexual act within 24 hours. Although this species is not venomous, the publication of this text in a national magazine gave notoriety to both the author and the claim.

== Gallery ==
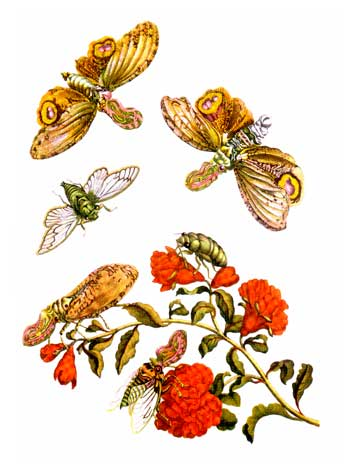
The fictional version of the
metamorphosis of F. laternaria
Maria Sibylla Merian, 1705

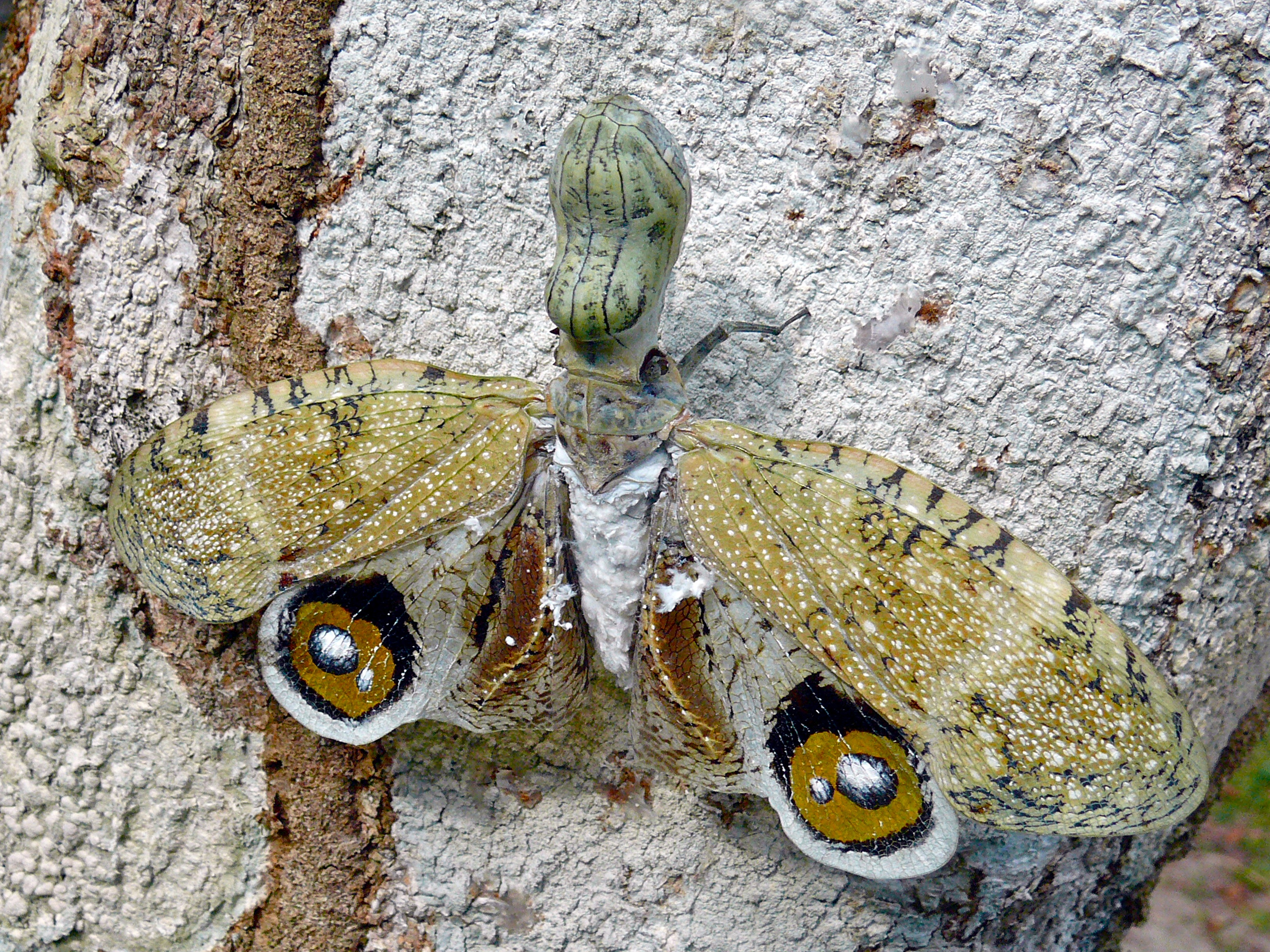

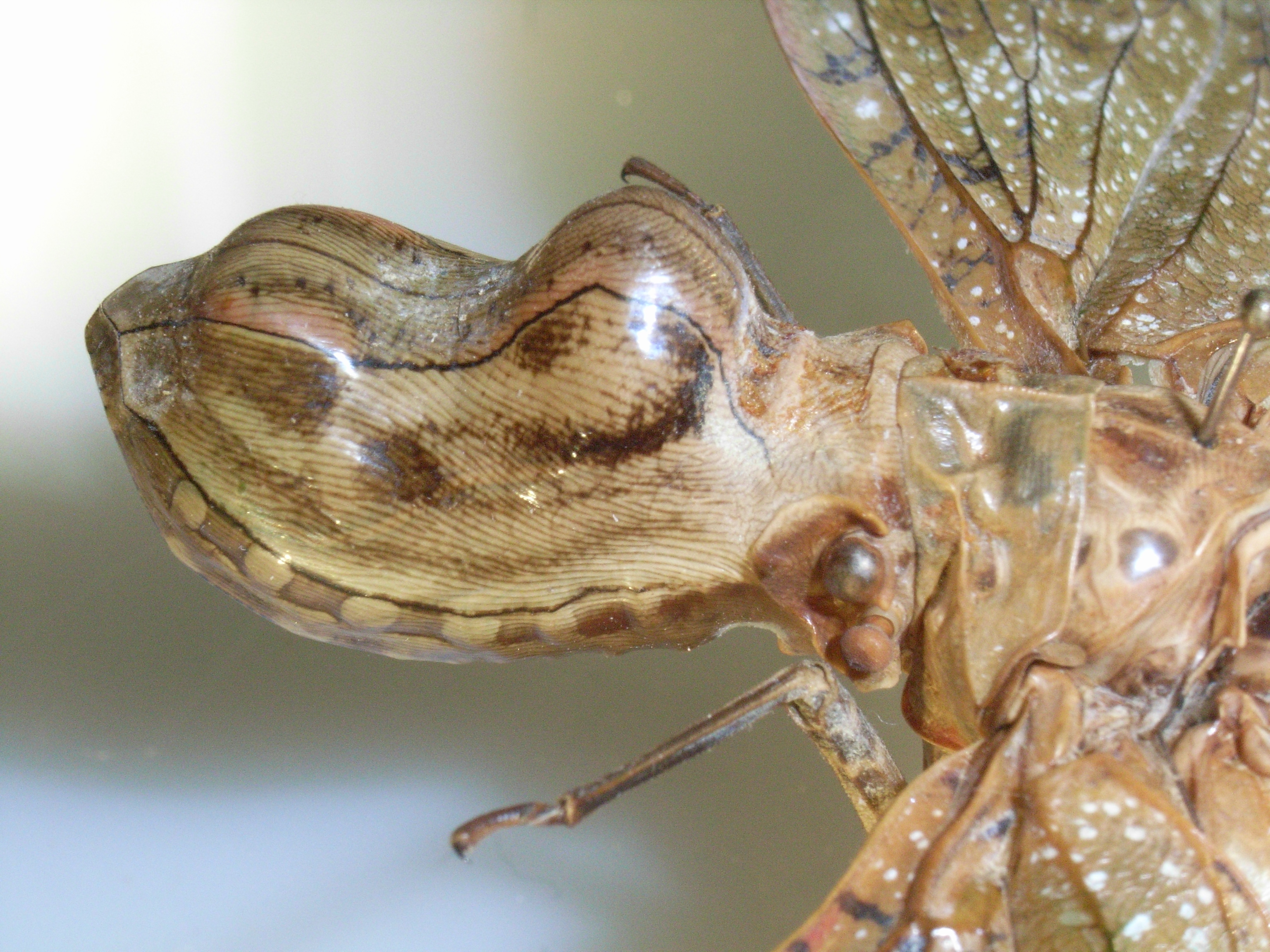
