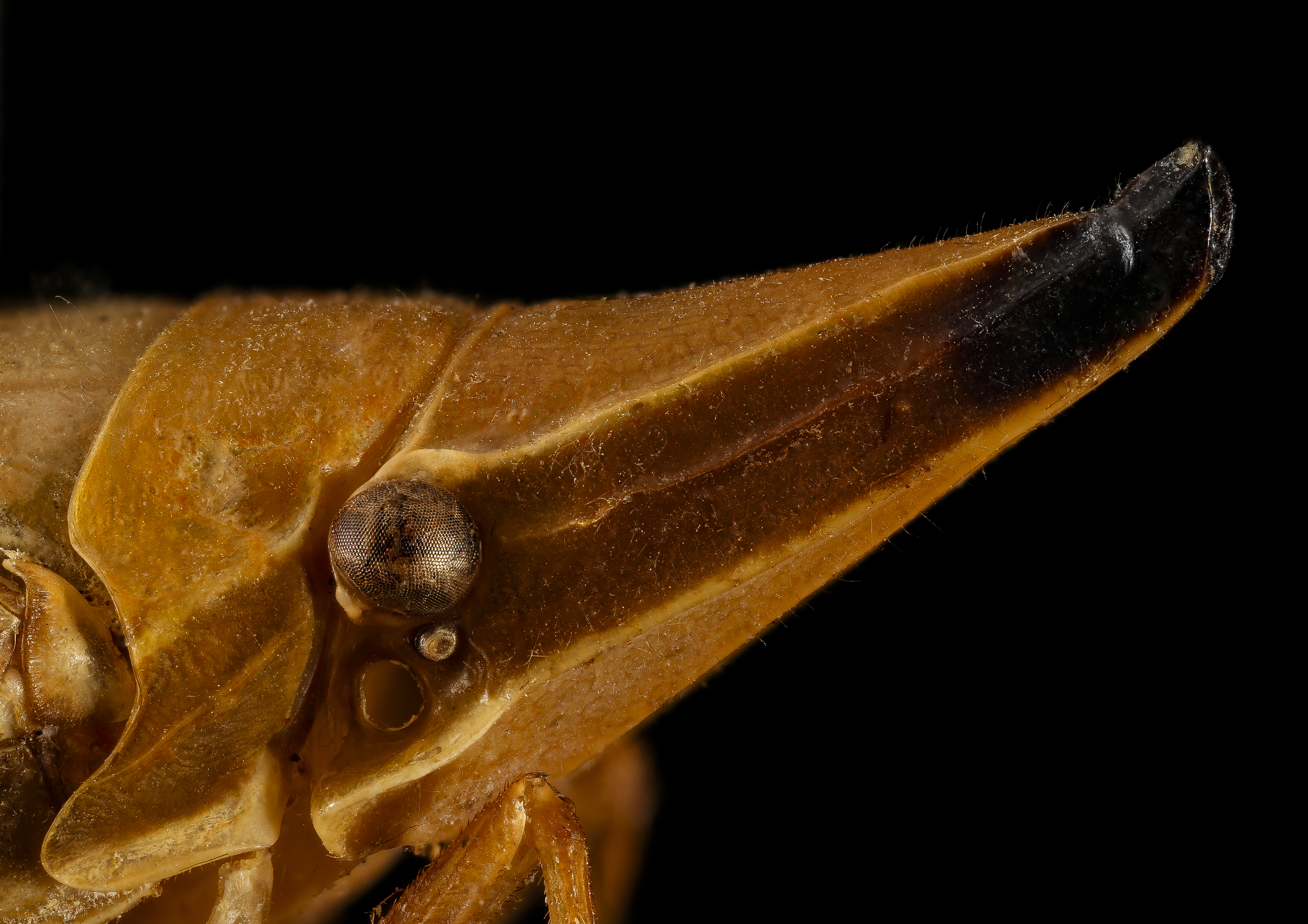

Scientific classification
- Domain: Eukaryota
- Kingdom: Animalia
- Phylum: Arthropoda
- Class: Insecta
- Order: Hemiptera
- Suborder: Auchenorrhyncha
- Infraorder: Fulgoromorpha
- Family: Fulgoridae
- Genus: Odontoptera
- Species: O. spectabilis

Binomial name
- Odontoptera spectabilis (Carreno, 1841)

= Odontoptera spectabilis =

Species of planthopper

Odontoptera spectabilis is a species lanternfly found in Central America.

== Identification ==
Like other Odontoptera, this species has a green body, an elongate cephalic process, and an apically oblique wing. Distinguished from other Odontoptera species by the cephalic process not apically lifted, the eyespot on the tegmen indistinct, at the line at 2/3rds of the tegmen, the anal angle falcate and the browning on the tegmen for the entire apical third.
