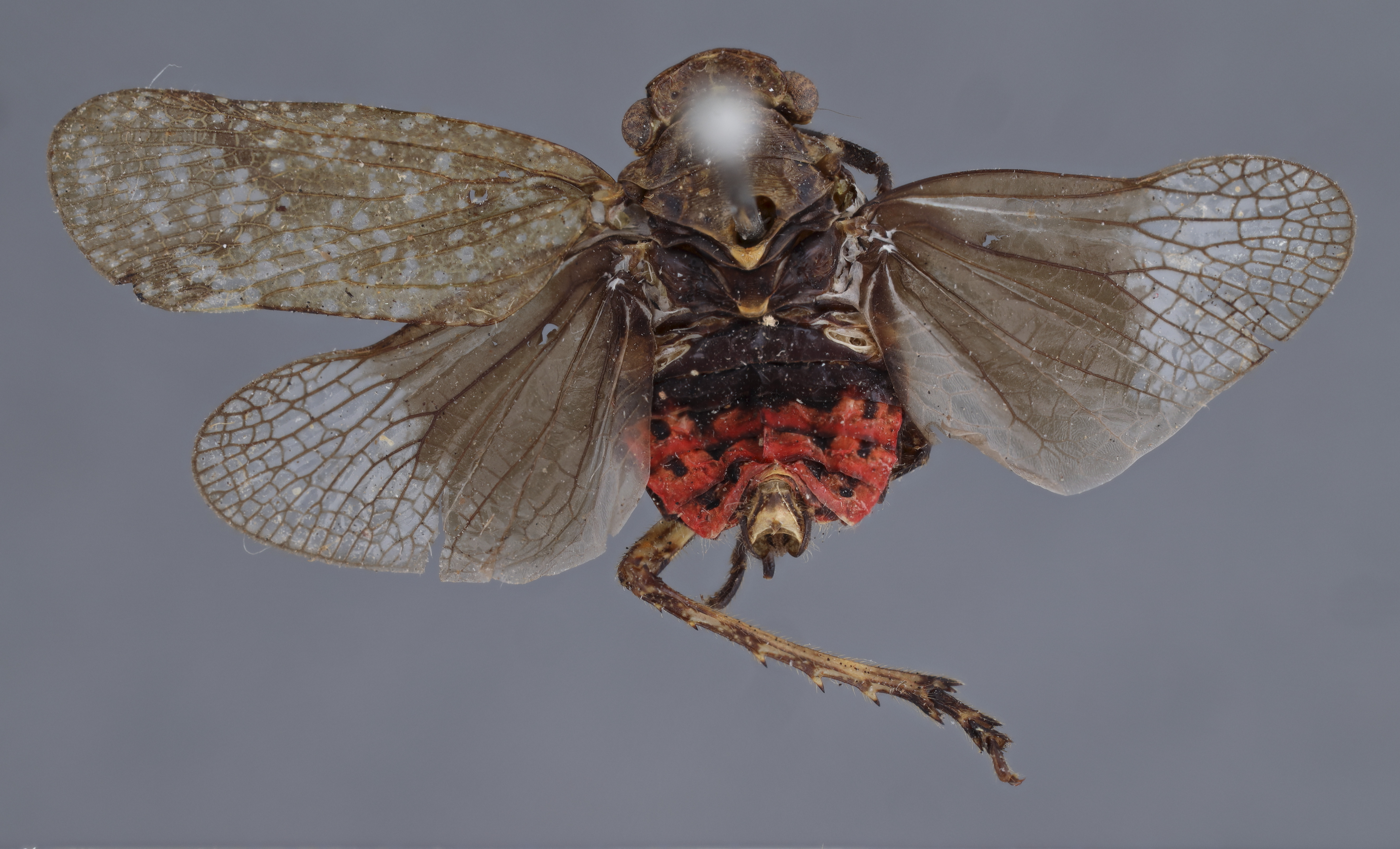

Scientific classification
- Kingdom: Animalia
- Phylum: Arthropoda
- Clade: Pancrustacea
- Class: Insecta
- Order: Hemiptera
- Suborder: Auchenorrhyncha
- Infraorder: Fulgoromorpha
- Family: Fulgoridae
- Genus: Poblicia
- Species: P. misella

Binomial name
- Poblicia misella (Stål, 1863)

Synonyms
- Poeocera misella Stål, 1863

= Poblicia misella =

Species of insect

Poblicia misella, the broad-headed speckled lanternfly, is a planthopper endemic to the Mexican state of Oaxaca. Very little is known about this species. It was originally described by Carl Stål in 1863. It is the type species of its genus.

== Description ==
Poblicia misella is mostly black in color. Its forewings are opaque and covered with pale, light blue spots. The hindwings form a dark grey color near the body into a smoky, almost translucent color towards the tip of the wing. the legs are black with irregular, sporadic white markings; these markings are more apparent in the hind legs. The abdomen is red with black markings. Male adults are around 10.5 mm (0.41 in) long, the length of adult females are unknown as of now. The head is broad and transverse and is narrower than the prothorax. The vertex is very wide and has ridges edges and a line down the middle. The eyes are bulbous and stick out of the side of the head.

Poblicia misella is very similar to Poblicia fuliginosa and Poblicia thanatophana in appearance but can be differentiated upon the body size and color, the vertex length, and range.

== Behavior and life cycle ==
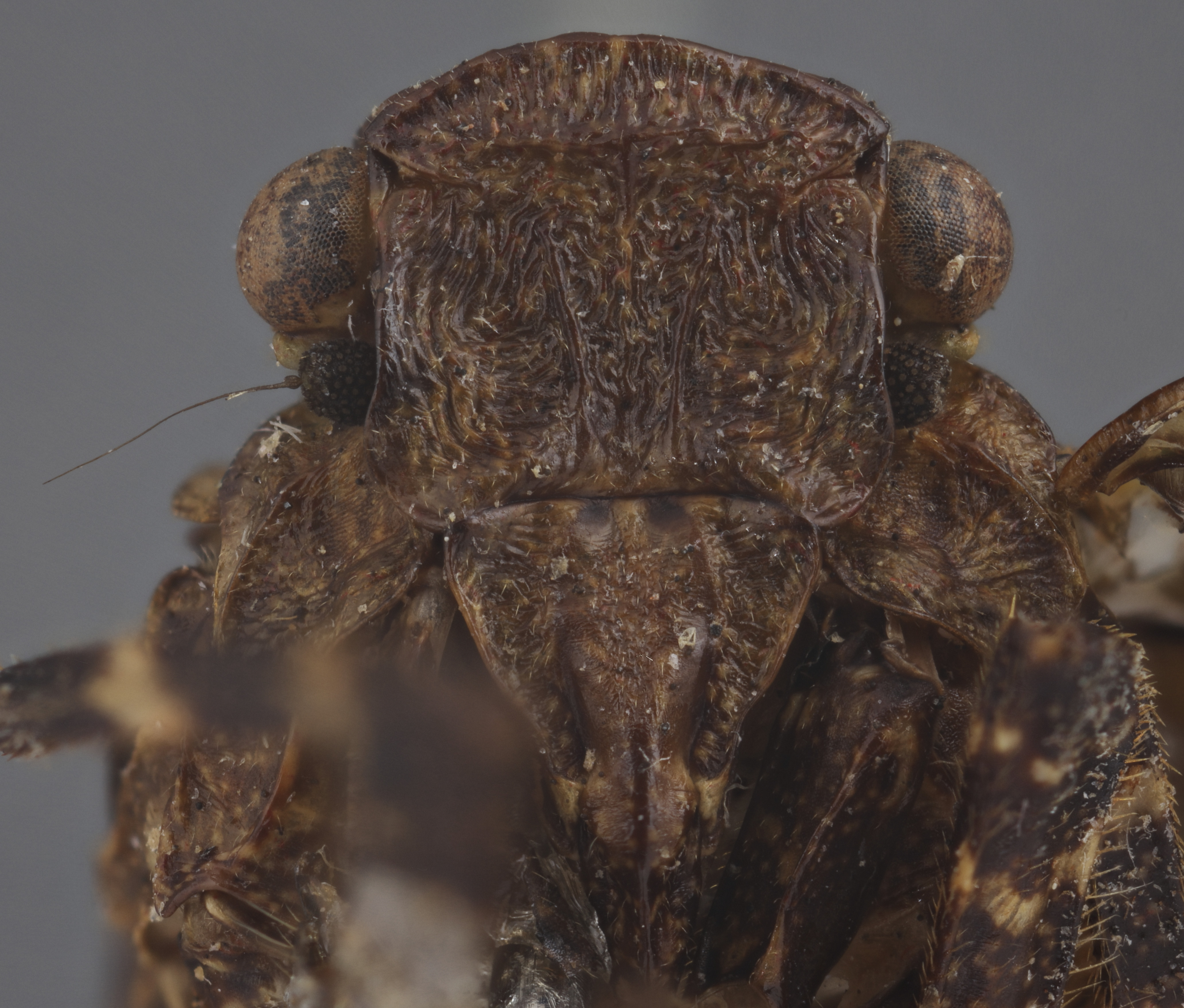
Poblicia misella's distinctive long head

Poblicia misella is hemimetabolous, meaning that it goes through multiple nymphal (instar) stages before reaching adulthood.
