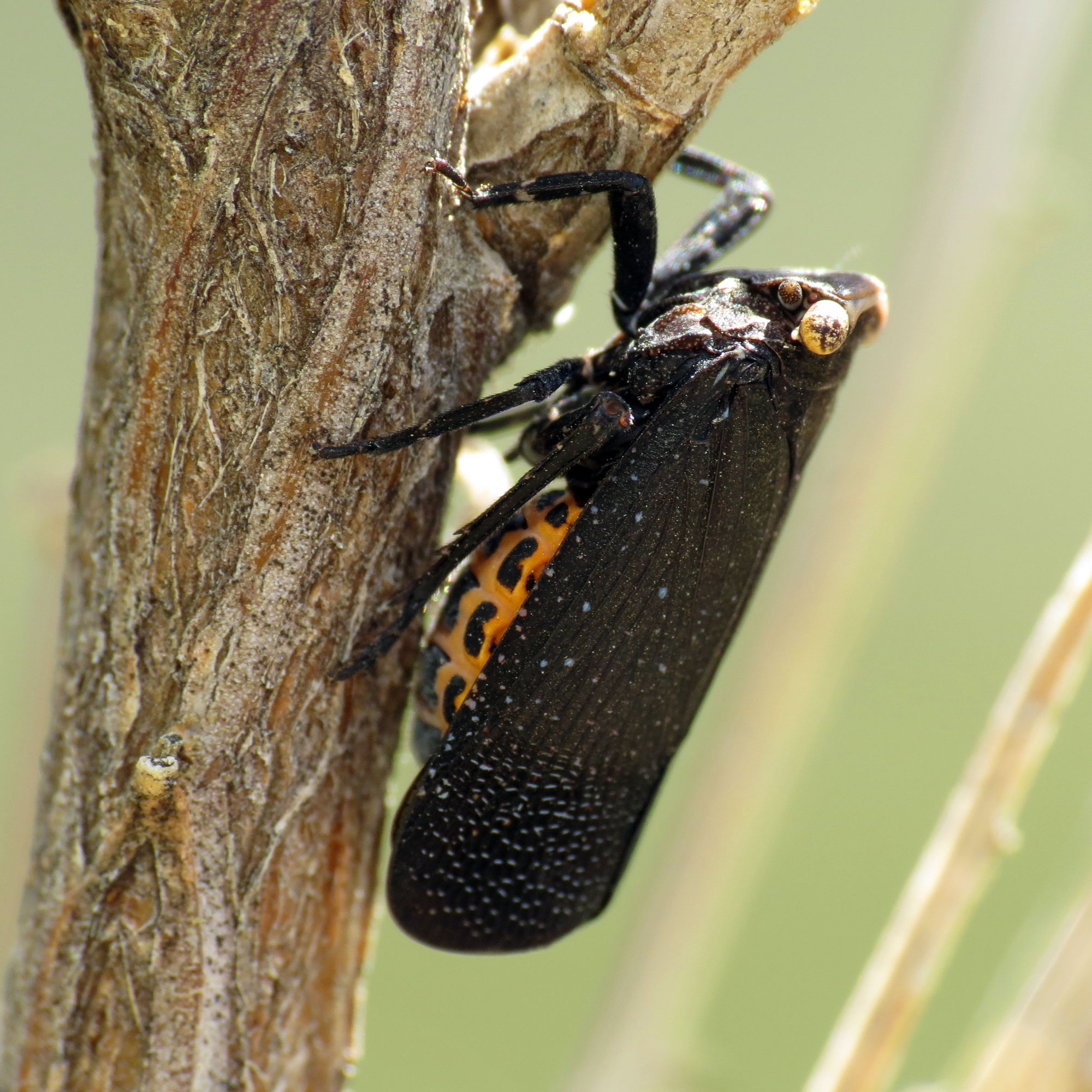
- Poblicia thanatophana

Scientific classification
- Kingdom: Animalia
- Phylum: Arthropoda
- Class: Insecta
- Order: Hemiptera
- Suborder: Auchenorrhyncha
- Infraorder: Fulgoromorpha
- Family: Fulgoridae
- Subfamily: Poiocerinae
- Tribe: Poiocerini
- Genus: Poblicia; Stål, 1866

Type species
- Poeocera misella Stål, 1863

Species
- See text

= Poblicia =

Genus of planthoppers

Poblicia is a genus of planthoppers in the family Fulgoridae occurring in North and Central America. The genus was established by Carl Stål in 1866. Some species were placed in the genus Crepusia, but this has been disputed; there are now four species in Poblicia.

== Species ==
- Poblicia cribrata (Gerstaecker, 1860)
- Poblicia fuliginosa (Olivier, 1791)
- Poblicia misella (Stål, 1863)
- Poblicia thanatophana (Kirkaldy, 1907)
