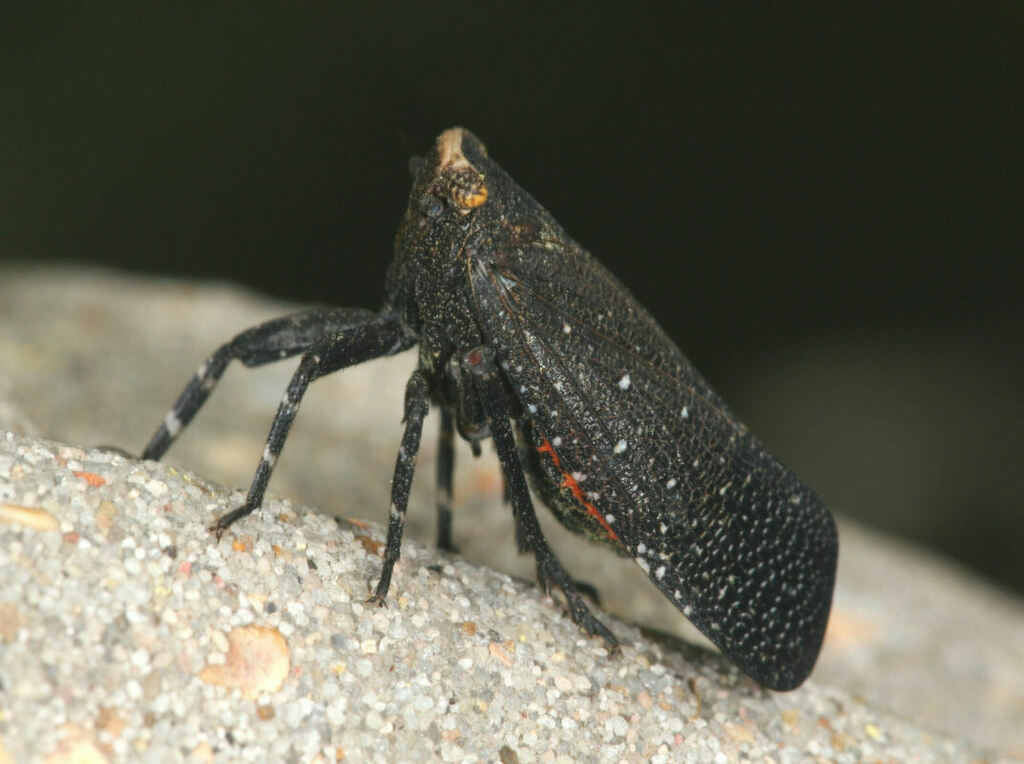
- Adult
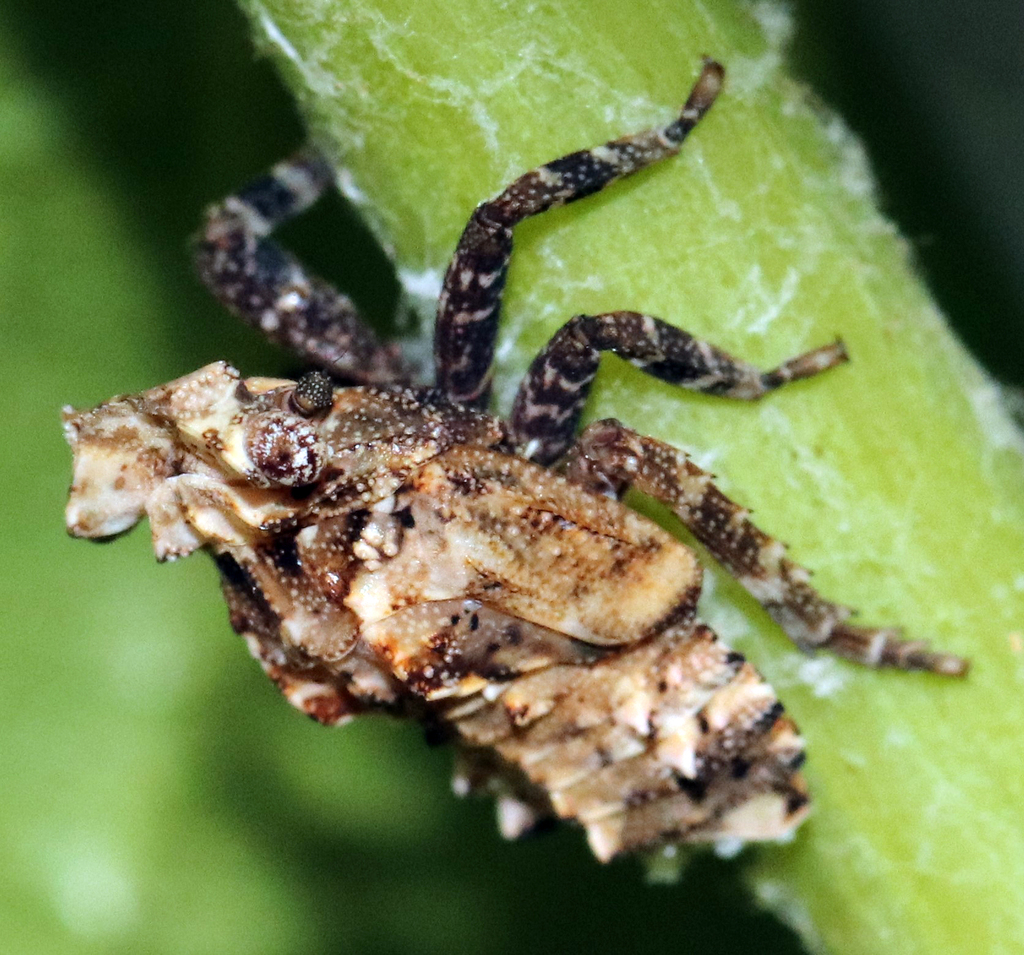
- Nymph

Scientific classification
- Kingdom: Animalia
- Phylum: Arthropoda
- Clade: Pancrustacea
- Class: Insecta
- Order: Hemiptera
- Suborder: Auchenorrhyncha
- Infraorder: Fulgoromorpha
- Family: Fulgoridae
- Genus: Poblicia
- Species: P. fuliginosa

Binomial name
- Poblicia fuliginosa (Olivier, 1791)

Synonyms
- Fulgora fuliginosa Olivier, 1791

= Poblicia fuliginosa =

Species of insect

Poblicia fuliginosa, the sumac speckled lanternfly, is a planthopper native to the eastern and central United States, described by Guillaume-Antoine Olivier in 1791. The generic placement of the species had been disputed, but a 2025 revision clarified its correct placement in Poblicia.

== Description ==
Poblicia fuliginosa is mostly dark in color, with minuscule, pale specks on the forewings. The head, specifically the vertex, is short and broad. The hindwings are a smoky grayish-transparent color, except for the proximal area, which is mostly black with two pale blue splotches. The bulbous eyes do not exceed the width of the closed forewings. The thorax and frontal abdominal segments are black, while the posterior abdominal segments are red. Adults are 8–17 mm (0.31–0.67 in) long. The legs often have two white bands on them. Nymphs are grayish-brown, with a dark brown thorax and a white head and abdomen. They have thorns/bumps all over their body.

Like many planthoppers, P. fuliginosa prefers to jump rather than fly.

== Host associations and life cycle ==
Poblicia fuliginosa mostly feeds on sumac (Rhus) species, especially the winged sumac (Rhus copallinum.) The species has also been recorded feeding on red maple (Acer rubrum), though this may not be a usual host. A related species, Poblicia thanatophana, formerly treated as a synonym, and occurring in the western United states, feeds on Baccharis salicifolia and Brickellia. It is usually found on the trunk of its host plants, while the nymphs are found near the base of the trunk. Poblicia fuliginosa is hemimetabolous, meaning that it has several nymphal stages before molting into an adult. The eggs are covered with white, creamy wax.

== Distribution ==
Poblicia fuliginosa is native to the United States, specifically the states of Alabama, Arkansas, Georgia, Illinois, Kansas, Louisiana, Maryland, Missouri, Mississippi, North Carolina, Oklahoma, South Carolina, Tennessee, and Texas, although there are some records in Mexico; this could be an undescribed species.

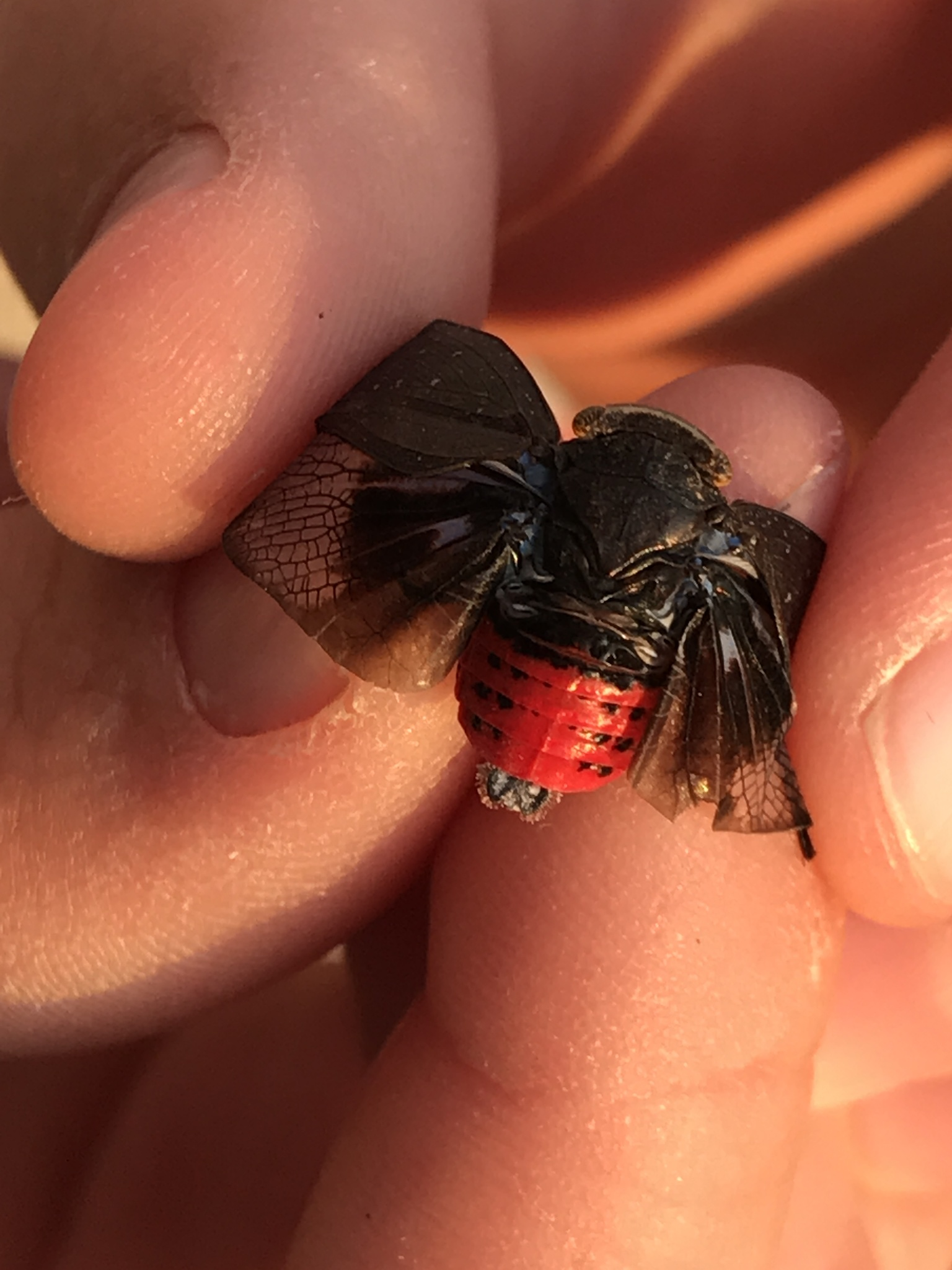
showing off its red abdomen.
