= List of Delphacinae genera =

This is a list of genera in the subfamily Delphacinae.

== Delphacinae genera ==
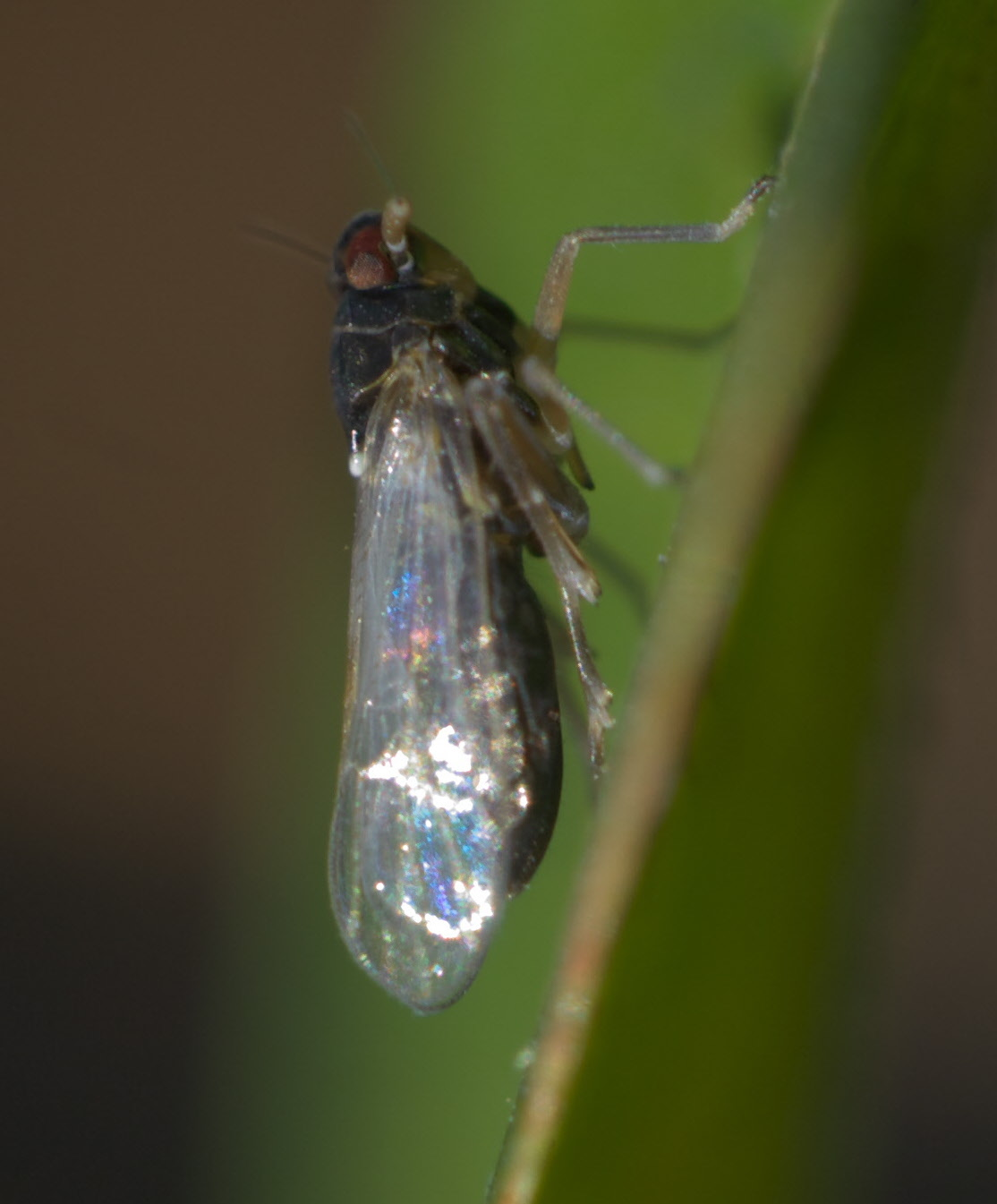
Isodelphax basivitta

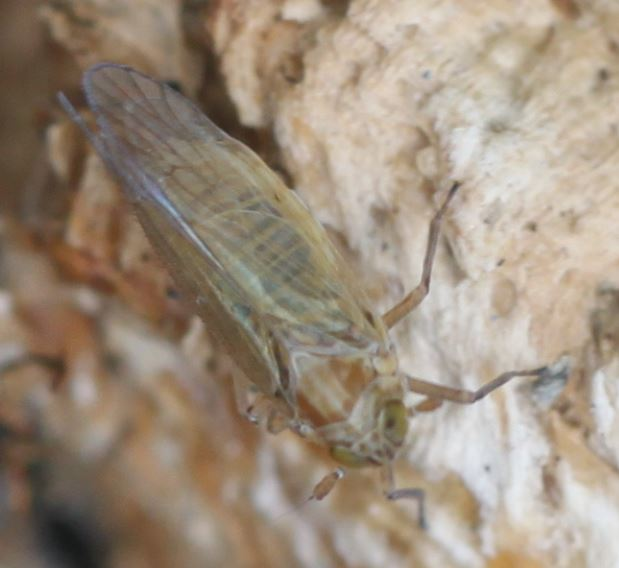
Metadelphax propinqua

- Abbrosoga Caldwell in Caldwell and Martorell, 1951
- Achorotile Fieber, 1866
- Acrodelphax Fennah, 1965
- Aethodelphax Bartlett and Hamilton, 2011
- Afrocoronacella Asche, 1988
- Afrokalpa Fennah, 1969
- Afrosellana Asche, 1988
- Afrosydne Fennah, 1969
- Agrisicula Asche, 1980
- Akemetopon Weglarz and Bartlett, 2011
- Akilas Distant, 1916
- Aloha Kirkaldy, 1904
- Altekon Fennah, 1975
- Ambarvalia Distant, 1917
- Amblycotis Stål, 1853
- Anchidelphax Fennah, 1965
- Anchodelphax Fennah, 1965
- Anectopia Kirkaldy, 1907
- Aneuidellana Asche, 1988
- Aneuides Fennah, 1969
- Antidryas Asche, 1998
- Aoyuanus Ding and Chen in Chen, Li and Ding, 2001
- Aplanodes Fennah, 1965
- Araeopus Spinola, 1839
- Arcifrons Ding and Yang in Ding et al., 1986
- Arcofaciella Fennah, 1956
- Arcofacies Muir, 1915
- Asiracemus Asche, 1988
- Asiracina Melichar, 1912
- Bakerella Crawford, 1914
- Bambucibatus Muir, 1915
- Bambusiphaga Huang and Ding in Huang et al., 1979
- Belocera Muir, 1913
- Bostaera Ball, 1902
- Brachycraera Muir, 1916
- Caenodelphax Fennah, 1965
- Calbodus Spinola, 1852
- Calisuspensus Ding, 2006
- Calligypona Sahlberg, 1871
- Cantoreanus Dlabola, 1971
- Carinodelphax Ding and Yang, 1987
- Carinofrons Chen and Li, 2000
- Cemopsis Fennah, 1978
- Cemus Fennah, 1964
- Changeondelphax Kwon, 1982
- Chilodelphax Vilbaste, 1968
- Chionomus Fennah, 1971
- Chloriona Fieber, 1866
- Chlorionidea Löw, 1885
- Clydonagma Fennah, 1969
- Columbiana Muir, 1919
- Columbisoga Muir, 1921
- Conocraera Muir, 1916
- Conomelus Fieber, 1866
- Consociata Qin and Zhang, 2006
- Coracodelphax Vilbaste, 1968
- Cormidius Emeljanov, 1972
- Coronacella Metcalf, 1950
- Cotoya Anufriev, 1977
- Criomorphus Curtis, 1833
- Curtometopum Muir, 1926
- Delphacellus Haupt, 1929
- Delphacinus Fieber, 1866
- Delphacodes Fieber, 1866
- Delphacodoides Muir, 1929
- Delphax Fabricius, 1798
- Dianus Ding, 2006
- Dicentropyx Emeljanov, 1972
- Dicranotropis Fieber, 1866
- Dictyophorodelphax Swezey, 1907
- Dingiana Qin, 2005
- Diodelphax Yang, 1989
- Ditropis Kirschbaum, 1868
- Ditropsis Wagner, 1963
- Dogodelphax Lindberg, 1956
- Ecdelphax Yang, 1989
- Elachodelphax Vilbaste, 1965
- Emelyanodelphax Koçak, 1981
- Emoloana Asche, 2000
- Eoeurysa Muir, 1913
- Eorissa Fennah, 1965
- Epeurysa Matsumura, 1900
- Eripison Fennah, 1969
- Eshanus Ding, 2006
- Euconomelus Haupt, 1929
- Euconon Fennah, 1975
- Euidastor Fennah, 1969
- Euidellana Metcalf, 1950
- Euidelloides Muir, 1926
- Euides Fieber, 1866
- Euidopsis Ribaut, 1948
- Eumetopina Breddin, 1896
- Eurybregma Scott, 1875
- Eurysa Fieber, 1866
- Eurysanoides Holzinger, Kammerlander and Nickel, 2003
- Eurysella Emeljanov, 1995
- Eurysula Vilbaste, 1968
- Falcotoya Fennah, 1969
- Fangdelphax Ding, 2006
- Ferganodelphax Dubovsky, 1970
- Flastena Nast, 1975
- Flavoclypeus
- Florodelphax Vilbaste, 1968
- Formodelphax Yang, 1989
- Ganus Ding, 2006
- Garaga Anufriev, 1977
- Glabrinotum Ding, 2006
- Gravesteiniella Wagner, 1963
- Gufacies Ding, 2006
- Guidelphax Ding, 2006
- Hadeodelphax Kirkaldy, 1906
- Hadropygos Gonzon and Bartlett, 2008
- Haerinella Fennah, 1965
- Hagamiodes Fennah, 1975
- Halmyra Mitjaev, 1971
- Hapalomelus Stål, 1853
- Haplodelphax Kirkaldy, 1907
- Harmalia Fennah, 1969
- Harmalianodes Asche, 1988
- Herbalima Emeljanov, 1972
- Himeunka Matsumura and Ishihara, 1945
- Hirozuunka Matsumura and Ishihara, 1945
- Holzfussella Schmidt, 1926
- Homosura Melichar, 1912
- Horcoma Fennah, 1969
- Horcomana Asche, 1988
- Horvathianella Anufriev, 1980
- Hyledelphax Vilbaste, 1968
- Idiobregma Anufriev, 1972
- Ilburnia White, 1878
- Indozuriel Fennah, 1975
- Ishiharodelphax Kwon, 1982
- Isodelphax Fennah, 1963
- Isogaetis Fennah, 1969
- Issedonia Emeljanov, 1972
- Iubsoda Nast, 1975
- Izella Fennah, 1965
- Jassidaeus Fieber, 1866
- Javesella Fennah, 1963
- Jinlinus Ding, 2006
- Kakuna Matsumura, 1935
- Kartalia Koçak, 1981
- Kazachicesa Koçak and Kemal, 2010
- Kelisoidea Beamer, 1950
- Keyflana Beamer, 1950
- Kormus Fieber, 1866
- Kosswigianella Wagner, 1963
- Kusnezoviella Vilbaste, 1965
- Laccocera Van Duzee, 1897
- Lacertina Remes Lenicov and Rossi Batiz, 2011
- Laminatopina Qin and Zhang, 2007
- Lanaphora Muir, 1915
- Laodelphax Fennah, 1963
- Laoterthrona Ding and Huang in Ding et al., 1980
- Latistria Huang and Ding in Huang et al., 1980
- Leialoha Kirkaldy, 1910
- Leptodelphax Haupt, 1927
- Leptoeurysa Fennah, 1988
- Leucydria Emeljanov, 1972
- Liburnia Stål, 1866
- Liburniella Crawford, 1914
- Lisogata Ding, 2006
- Litemixia Asche, 1980
- Litochodelphax Asche, 1982
- Longtania Ding, 2006
- Luda Ding, 2006
- Luxorianella Asche, 1994
- Macrocorupha Muir, 1926
- Macrotomella Van Duzee, 1897
- Mahmutkashgaria Koçak and Kemal, 2008
- Makarorysa Remane and Asche, 1986
- Malaxa Melichar, 1914
- Malaxella Ding and Hu in Ding et al., 1986
- Malaxodes Fennah, 1967
- Maosogata Ding, 2006
- Marquedryas Asche, 1998
- Matsumuranoda Metcalf, 1943
- Matutinus Distant, 1917
- Megadelphax Wagner, 1963
- Megamelanus Ball, 1902
- Megamelodes Le Quesne, 1960
- Megamelus Fieber, 1866
- Mengdelphax Ding in Ding and Zhang, 1994
- Meristopsis Kennedy, Bartlett and Wilson, 2012
- Mestus Motschulsky, 1863
- Metadelphax Wagner, 1963
- Metroma Ding, 2006
- Metropis Fieber, 1866
- Micistylus Guo and Liang, 2006
- Micreuides Fennah, 1969
- Mirabella Emeljanov, 1982
- Miranus Chen and Ding in Chen, Li and Ding, 2001
- Mirocauda Chen, 2003
- Monospinodelphax Ding, 2006
- Mucillnata Qin and Zhang, 2010
- Muellerianella Wagner, 1963
- Muirodelphax Wagner, 1963
- Nanotoya Fennah, 1975
- Nataliana Muir, 1926
- Nazugumia Koçak and Kemal, 2008
- Necodan Fennah, 1975
- Nemetor Fennah, 1969
- Neobelocera Ding and Yang in Ding, Yang and Hu, 1986
- Neocarinodelphax Chen and Tsai, 2009
- Neoconon Yang, 1989
- Neodicranotropis Yang, 1989
- Neogadora Fennah, 1969
- Neomalaxa Muir, 1918
- Neomegamelanus McDermott, 1952
- Neometopina Yang, 1989
- Neoperkinsiella Muir, 1926
- Neoterthrona Yang, 1989
- Nesodryas Kirkaldy, 1908
- Nesorestias Kirkaldy, 1908
- Nesorthia Fennah, 1962
- Nesosydne Kirkaldy, 1907
- Nesothoe Kirkaldy, 1908
- Neunkanodes Yang, 1989
- Neuterthron Ding, 2006
- Nicetor Fennah, 1964
- Nilaparvata Distant, 1906
- Niphisia Emeljanov, 1966
- Nothodelphax Fennah, 1963
- Nothokalpa Fennah, 1975
- Nothorestias Muir, 1917
- Notogryps Fennah, 1965
- Notohyus Fennah, 1965
- Numata Matsumura, 1935
- Numathriambus Asche, 1988
- Numatodes Fennah, 1964
- Nycheuma Fennah, 1964
- Oaristes Fennah, 1964
- Oncodelphax Wagner, 1963
- Onidodelphax Yang, 1989
- Opiconsiva Distant, 1917
- Orcaenas Fennah, 1969
- Orchesma Melichar, 1903
- Orientoya Chen and Ding in Chen, Li and Ding, 2001
- Palego Fennah, 1978
- Paraconon Yang, 1989
- Paracorbulo Tian and Ding in Tian, Ding and Kuoh, 1980
- Paradelphacodes Wagner, 1963
- Paraliburnia Jensen-Haarup, 1917
- Paramestus Ding, 2006
- Paranectopia Ding and Tian, 1981
- Paratoya Ding, 2006
- Pareuidella Beamer, 1951
- Parkana Beamer, 1950
- Partoya Asche, 1988
- Pastiroma Dlabola, 1967
- Peliades Jacobi, 1928
- Penepissonotus Beamer, 1950
- Peregrinus Kirkaldy, 1904
- Perkinsiella Kirkaldy, 1903
- Phacalastor Kirkaldy, 1906
- Phrictopyga Caldwell in Caldwell & Martorell, 1951
- Phyllodinus Van Duzee, 1897
- Pissonotus Van Duzee, 1897
- Plagiotropis Emeljanov, 1993
- Platycorpus Ding, 1983
- Platyeurysa Fennah, 1988
- Platypareia Muir, 1934
- Platytibia Ding, 2006
- Porcellus Emeljanov, 1972
- Prasliniana Asche, 1998
- Procidelphax Bartlett, 2010
- Prodelphax Yang, 1989
- Prokelisia Osborn, 1905
- Pseudaraeopus Kirkaldy, 1904
- Pseudembolophora Muir, 1920
- Pseudodelphacodes Wagner, 1963
- Pseudomacrocorupha Muir, 1930
- Pseudosogata Ding, 2006
- Pundaluoya Kirkaldy, 1903
- Purohita Distant, 1906
- Pygospina Caldwell in Caldwell & Martorell, 1951
- Qianlia Ding, 2006
- Queenslandicesa Koçak and Kemal, 2010
- Ramidelphax Qin and Zhang, 2006
- Rectivertex Guo and Liang, 2006
- Remanodelphax Drosopoulos, 1982
- Rhinodelphax Muir, 1934
- Rhinotettix Stål, 1853
- Rhombotoya Fennah, 1975
- Ribautodelphax Wagner, 1963
- Rotundifronta Beamer, 1950
- Saccharosydne Kirkaldy, 1907
- Sardia Melichar, 1903
- Scolopygos Bartlett, 2002
- Scotoeurysa Fennah, 1988
- Scottianella Anufriev, 1980
- Sembrax Fennah, 1969
- Shadelphax Ding, 2006
- Shijidelphax Ding, 2006
- Sibirodelphax Vilbaste, 1980
- Sinolacme Fennah, 1978
- Sinoperkinsiella Ding, 1983
- Smaroides Fennah, 1988
- Smicrotatodelphax Kirkaldy, 1906
- Sogata Distant, 1906
- Sogatella Fennah, 1956
- Sogatellana Kuoh in Huang et al., 1980
- Sogatopsis Muir, 1913
- Sparnia Stål, 1862
- Spartidelphax Bartlett & Webb, 2014
- Specinervures Kuoh and Ding, 1980
- Spinaprocessus Ding, 2006
- Spinidelphacella Asche, 1988
- Stiroma Fieber, 1866
- Stiromella Wagner, 1963
- Stiromeurysa Dlabola, 1965
- Stiromoides Vilbaste, 1971
- Stobaera Stål, 1859
- Stolbax Fennah, 1969
- Strophalinx Fennah, 1969
- Struebingianella Wagner, 1963
- Sulix Fennah, 1965
- Syndelphax Fennah, 1963
- Synpteron Muir, 1926
- Tagosodes Asche and Wilson, 1990
- Tarophagus Zimmerman, 1948
- Temenites Fennah, 1965
- Terthron Fennah, 1965
- Terthronella Vilbaste, 1968
- Thrasymemnon Fennah, 1965
- Thriambus Fennah, 1964
- Thymobares Fennah, 1964
- Thymodelphax Asche, 1988
- Toya Distant, 1906
- Toyalana Asche, 1988
- Toyoides Matsumura, 1935
- Trichodelphax Vilbaste, 1968
- Triloris Fennah, 1969
- Tropidocephala Stål, 1853
- Tsaurus Yang, 1989
- Tumidagena McDermott, 1952
- Ulanar Fennah, 1975
- Unkanodella Vilbaste, 1968
- Unkanodes Fennah, 1956
- Veo Fennah, 1978
- Wuyia Ding, 1991
- Xanthodelphax Wagner, 1963
- Xinchloriona Ding, 2006
- Yalia Ding, 2006
- Yangsinolacme Ding, 2006
- Yanunka Ishihara, 1952
- Yichunus Ding, 2006
- Yuanchia Chen and Tsai, 2009
- Yukonodelphax Wilson, 1992
- Zanchetrius Fennah, 1978
- Zhuangella Ding, 2006
- Zhudelphax Ding, 2006
