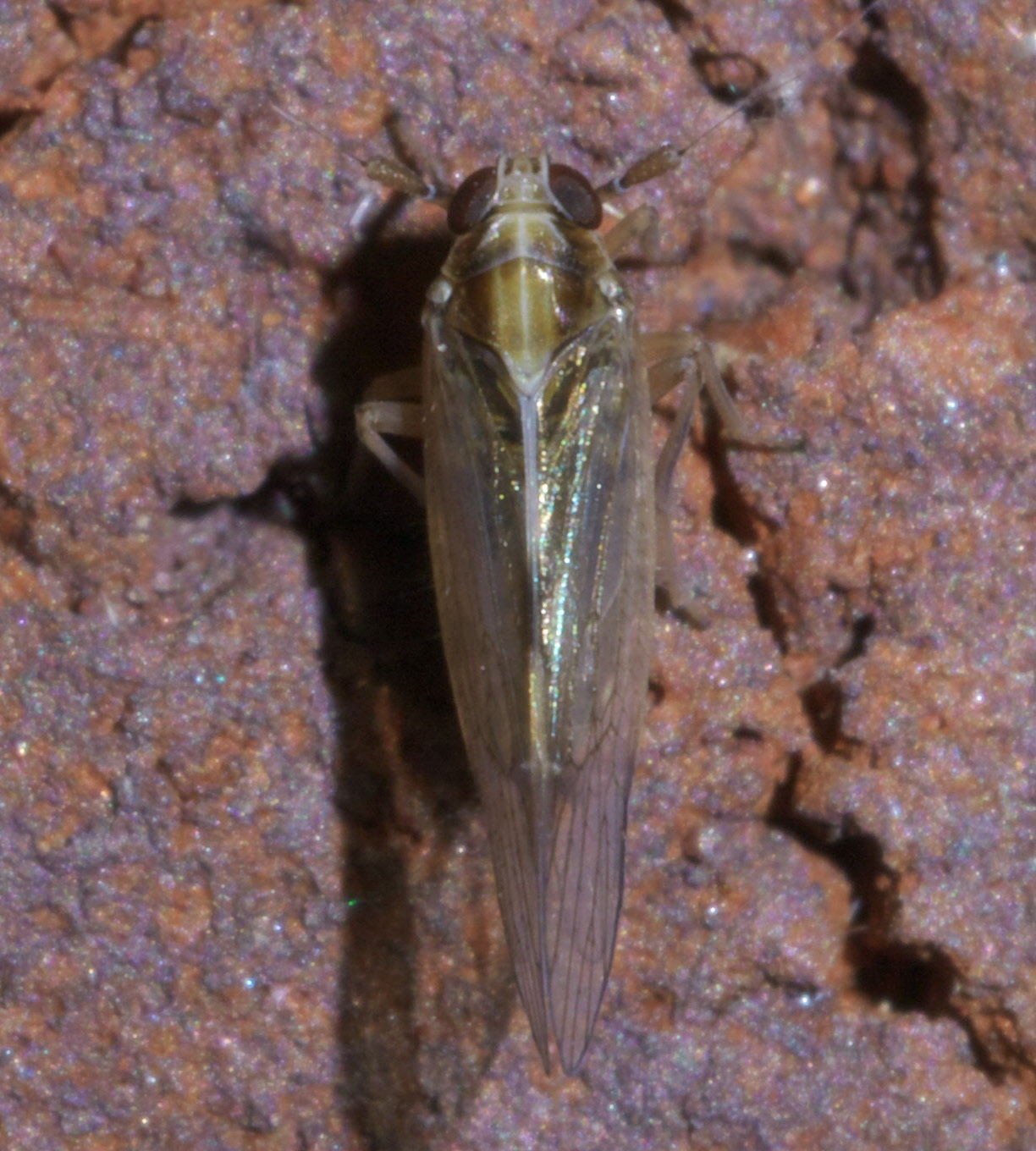
- Sogatella sp.

Scientific classification
- Kingdom: Animalia
- Phylum: Arthropoda
- Class: Insecta
- Order: Hemiptera
- Suborder: Auchenorrhyncha
- Infraorder: Fulgoromorpha
- Family: Delphacidae
- Subfamily: Delphacinae
- Tribe: Delphacini; Leach, 1815

Synonyms
- Criomorphini Kirkaldy; Alohini Muir; Stirominae Wagner

= Delphacini =

Tribe of true bugs

External image
- Images at iNaturalist

Delphacini is an important tribe of planthoppers with a world-wide distribution.

== Nutrition and Pest species ==
All species are phytophagous, many occurring on various grasses, including cereal crop species. Some of these planthoppers are important pests, either simply due to feeding, or as vectors for plant pathogens. Examples include:

- The rice brown planthopper, Nilaparvata lugens (Stål, 1854)
- The white-backed planthopper (of rice), Sogatella furcifera (Horváth, 1899)
- The sugarcane planthopper, Perkinsiella saccharicida Kirkaldy, 1903

== Genera ==
BioLib and FLOW include the following:

1. Abbrosoga Caldwell in Caldwell & Martorell, 1951
2. Acanthodelphax Le Quesne, 1964
3. Achorotile Fieber, 1866
4. Acrodelphax Fennah, 1965
5. Aethodelphax Bartlett & Hamilton, 2011
6. Afrocoronacella Asche, 1988
7. Afrokalpa Fennah, 1969
8. Afrosellana Asche, 1988
9. Afrosydne Fennah, 1969
10. Agrisicula Asche, 1980
11. Akemetopon Weglarz & Bartlett, 2011
12. Akilas Distant, 1916
13. Alketon Fennah, 1975
14. Aloha Kirkaldy, 1904
15. Altekon Fennah, 1975
16. Ambarvalia Distant, 1917
17. Amblycotis Stål, 1853
18. Ampliphax Bartlett & Kunz, 2015
19. Anchidelphax Fennah, 1965
20. Anectopia Kirkaldy, 1907
21. Aneuidellana Asche, 1988
22. Aneuides Fennah, 1969
23. Antidryas Asche, 1998
24. Aoyuanus Ding & Chen, 2001
25. Aplanodes Fennah, 1965
26. Araeopus Spinola, 1839
27. Asiracemus Asche, 1988
28. Asiracina Melichar, 1912
29. Astatometopon Campodonico, 2017
30. Athenidelphax Bartlett, 2025
31. Bakerella Crawford, 1914
32. Bostaera Ball, 1902
33. Brachycraera Muir, 1916
34. Caenodelphax Fennah, 1965
35. Calbodus Spinola, 1852
36. Calisuspensus Ding, 2006
37. Calligypona J. Sahlberg, 1871
38. Cantoreanus Dlabola, 1971
39. Cemopsis Fennah, 1978
40. Cemus Fennah, 1964
41. Changeondelphax Kwon, 1982
42. Chionomus Fennah, 1971
43. Chloriona Fieber, 1866
44. Chlorionidea Löw, 1885
45. Clydonagma Fennah, 1969
46. Conomelus Fieber, 1866
47. Consociata Qin & Zhang, 2006
48. Coracodelphax Vilbaste, 1968
49. Cormidius Emeljanov, 1972
50. Coronacella Metcalf, 1950
51. Cotoya Anufriev, 1977
52. Criomorphus Curtis, 1833
53. Curtometopum Muir, 1926
54. Delphacellus Haupt, 1929
55. Delphacinus Fieber, 1866
56. Delphacissa Kirkaldy, 1906
57. Delphacodes Fieber, 1866
58. Delphacodoides Muir, 1929
59. Delphax Fabricius, 1798
60. Dianus Ding, 2006
61. Dicentropyx Emeljanov, 1972
62. Dicranotropis Fieber, 1866
63. Dictyophorodelphax Swezey, 1907
64. Dingiana Qin, 2005
65. Diodelphax Yang, 1989
66. Distantinus Bellis & Donaldson, 2015
67. Ditropis Kirschbaum, 1868
68. Ditropsis Wagner, 1963
69. Dogodelphax Lindberg, 1956
70. Ecdelphax Yang, 1989
71. Elachodelphax Vilbaste, 1965
72. Emelyanodelphax Koçak, 1981
73. Emoloana Asche, 2000
74. Eoeurysa Muir, 1913
75. Eorissa Fennah, 1965
76. Eripison Fennah, 1969
77. Eshanus Ding, 2006
78. Euconomelus Haupt, 1929
79. Euconon Fennah, 1975
80. Euidastor Fennah, 1969
81. Euidellana Metcalf, 1950
82. Euidelloides Muir, 1926
83. Euides Fieber, 1866
84. Euidopsis Ribaut, 1948
85. Eumetopina Breddin, 1896
86. Eurybregma Scott, 1875
87. Euryburnia Emeljanov, 2019
88. Eurysa Fieber, 1866
89. Eurysacola Della Giustina, 2019
90. Eurysanaea Della Giustina, 2019
91. Eurysanoides Holzinger, Kammerlander & Nickel, 2003
92. Eurysella Emeljanov, 1995
93. Eurysiana Della Giustina, 2019
94. Eurysula Vilbaste, 1968
95. Falcotoya Fennah, 1969
96. Fangdelphax Ding, 2006
97. Ferganodelphax Dubovsky, 1970
98. Flastena Nast, 1975
99. Flavoclypeus Kennedy & Bartlett, 2014
100. Florodelphax Vilbaste, 1968
101. Formodelphax Yang, 1989
102. Ganus Ding, 2006
103. Garaga Anufriev, 1977
104. Gelastodelphax Kirkaldy, 1906
105. Glabrinotum Ding, 2006
106. Gravesteiniella Wagner, 1963
107. Guidelphax Ding, 2006
108. Hadropygos Gonzon & Bartlett, 2007
109. Hagamiodes Fennah, 1975
110. Halmyra Mitjaev, 1971
111. Hapalomelus Stål, 1853
112. Haplodelphax Kirkaldy, 1907
113. Harmalia Fennah, 1969
114. Harmalianodes Asche, 1988
115. Herbalima Emeljanov, 1972
116. Himeunka Matsumura & Ishihara, 1945
117. Hirozunka Matsumura & Ishihara, 1945
118. Homosura Melichar, 1912
119. Horcoma Fennah, 1969
120. Horcomana Asche, 1988
121. Horvathianella Anufriev, 1980
122. Hyledelphax Vilbaste, 1968
123. Idiobregma Anufriev, 1972
124. Ilburnia White, 1878
125. Indozuriel Fennah, 1975
126. Ishiharodelphax Kwon, 1982
127. Isodelphax Fennah, 1963
128. Isogaetis Fennah, 1969
129. Issedonia Emeljanov, 1972
130. Iubsoda Nast, 1975
131. Izella Fennah, 1965
132. Javesella Fennah, 1963
133. Jinlinus Ding, 2006
134. Kakuna Matsumura, 1935
135. Kartalia Koçak, 1981
136. Kazachicesa Koçak & Kemal, 2010
137. Kelisoidea Beamer, 1950
138. Keyflana Beamer, 1950
139. Kormus Fieber, 1866
140. Kosswigianella Wagner, 1963
141. Kusnezoviella Vilbaste, 1965
142. Laccocera Van Duzee, 1897
143. Laodelphax Fennah, 1963
144. Laoterthrona Ding & Huang, 1980
145. Latistria Huang & Ding, 1980
146. Leialoha Kirkaldy, 1910
147. Lepidelphax Remes Lenicov & Walsh, 2013
148. Leptodelphax Haupt, 1927
149. Leptoeurysa Fennah, 1988
150. Leucydria Emeljanov, 1972
151. Liburnia Stål, 1866
152. Liburniella Crawford, 1914
153. Lisogata Ding, 2006
154. Litemixia Asche, 1980
155. Litochodelphax Asche, 1982
156. Loginovia Emeljanov, 1982
157. Longtania Ding, 2006
158. luda Ding, 2006
159. Luxorianella Asche, 1994
160. Macrotomella Van Duzee, 1907
161. Mahmutkashgaria Koçak & Kemal, 2008
162. Makarorysa Remane & Asche, 1986
163. Malaxodes Fennah, 1967
164. Maosogata Ding, 2006
165. Marquedryas Asche, 1998
166. Matsumuramata Xing & Chen, 2014
167. Matsumuranoda Metcalf, 1943
168. Megadelphax Wagner, 1963
169. Megamelanus Ball, 1902
170. Megamelodes Le Quesne, 1960
171. Megamelus Fieber, 1866
172. Melaniphax Bartlett, 2019
173. Meristopsis Kennedy, Bartlett & Wilson, 2012
174. Mestus Motschulsky, 1863
175. Metadelphax Wagner, 1963
176. Metroma Ding, 2006
177. Metropis Fieber, 1866
178. Micistylus Guo & Liang, 2006
179. Micreuides Fennah, 1969
180. Mirabella Emeljanov, 1982
181. Miranus Chen & Ding, 2001
182. Monospinodelphax Ding, 2006
183. Movesella Emeljanov, 1982
184. Muellerianella Wagner, 1963
185. Muirodelphax Wagner, 1963
186. Nanotoya Fennah, 1975
187. Nataliana Muir, 1926
188. Nazugumia Koçak & Kemal, 2008
189. Necodan Fennah, 1975
190. Nemetor Fennah, 1969
191. Neoconon Yang, 1989
192. Neodelphax Remes Lenicov & Brentassi, 2017
193. Neodicranotropis Yang, 1989
194. Neogadora Fennah, 1969
195. Neomegamelanus McDermott, 1952
196. Neometopina Yang, 1989
197. Neoperkinsiella Muir, 1926
198. Neoterthrona Yang, 1989
199. Nesodryas Kirkaldy, 1908
200. Nesorestias Kirkaldy, 1908
201. Nesorthia Fennah, 1962
202. Nesosydne Kirkaldy, 1907
203. Nesothoe Kirkaldy, 1908
204. Neunkanodes Yang, 1989
205. Neuterthron Ding, 2006
206. Nicetor Fennah, 1964
207. Nilaparvata Distant, 1906
208. Niphisia Emeljanov, 1966
209. Nothodelphax Fennah, 1963
210. Nothokalpa Fennah, 1975
211. Nothorestias Muir, 1917
212. Notogryps Fennah, 1965
213. Notohyus Fennah, 1965
214. Numathriambus Asche, 1988
215. Numatodes Fennah, 1964
216. Nycheuma Fennah, 1964
217. Oaristes Fennah, 1964
218. Oncodelphax Wagner, 1963
219. Onidodelphax Yang, 1989
220. Opiconsiva Distant, 1917
221. Orcaenas Fennah, 1969
222. Orientoya Chen & Ding, 2001
223. Palego Fennah, 1978
224. Paraconon Yang, 1989
225. Paracorbulo Tian, Ding & Kuoh, 1980
226. Paradelphacodes Wagner, 1963
227. Paradelphax Vilbaste, 1980
228. Paraliburnia Jensen-Haarup, 1917
229. Paranectopia Ding & Tian, 1981
230. Parasogata Zhou, Yang & Chen, 2018
231. Paratoya Ding, 2006
232. Pareuidella Beamer, 1951
233. Parkana Beamer, 1950
234. Partoya Asche, 1988
235. Pastiroma Dlabola, 1967
236. Peliades Jacobi, 1928
237. Penepissonotus Beamer, 1950
238. Peregrinus Kirkaldy, 1904
239. Perkinsiella Kirkaldy, 1903
240. Phacalastor Kirkaldy, 1906
241. Phrictopyga Caldwell & Martorell, 1951
242. Phyllodinus Van Duzee, 1897
243. Pissonotus Van Duzee, 1894
244. Plagiotropis Emeljanov, 1993
245. Platycorpus Ding, 1983
246. Platypareia Muir, 1934
247. Platytibia Ding, 2006
248. Porcellus Emeljanov, 1972
249. Prasliniana Asche, 1998
250. Prodelphax Yang, 1989
251. Prokelisia Osborn, 1905
252. Pseudaraeopus Kirkaldy, 1904
253. Pseudodelphacodes Wagner, 1963
254. Pseudosogata Ding, 2006
255. Pygospina Caldwell & Martorell, 1951
256. Pyrophagus Remes Lenicov, 2014
257. Qianlia Ding, 2006
258. Queenslandicesa Koçak & Kemal, 2010
259. Ramidelphax Qin & Zhang, 2006
260. Rectivertex Guo & Liang, 2006
261. Remanodelphax Drosopoulos, 1982
262. Rhinodelphax Muir, 1934
263. Rhinotettix Stål, 1853
264. Rhombotoya Fennah, 1975
265. Ribautodelphax Wagner, 1963
266. Rotundifronta Beamer, 1950
267. Salinesia Campodonico & Coccia, 2019
268. Sardia Melichar, 1903
269. Scolopygos Bartlett, 2002
270. Scotoeurysa Fennah, 1988
271. Scottianella Anufriev, 1980
272. Sembrax Fennah, 1969
273. Shadelphax Ding, 2006
274. Shijidelphax Ding, 2006
275. Sibirodelphax Vilbaste, 1980
276. Sinolacme Fennah, 1978
277. Sinoperkinsiella Ding, 1983
278. Smicrotatodelphax Kirkaldy, 1906
279. Sogata Distant, 1906
280. Sogatella Fennah, 1956
281. Sogatellana Kuoh, 1980
282. Sparnia Stål, 1862
283. Spartidelphax Bartlett & Webb, 2014
284. Spinaprocessus Ding, 2006
285. Spinidelphacella Asche, 1988
286. Stiroma Fieber, 1866
287. Stiromella Wagner, 1963
288. Stiromeurysa Dlabola, 1965
289. Stiromoides Vilbaste, 1971
290. Stobaera Stål, 1859
291. Stolbax Fennah, 1969
292. Strophalinx Fennah, 1969
293. Struebingianella Wagner, 1963
294. Sulix Fennah, 1965
295. Syndelphax Fennah, 1963
296. Synpteron Muir, 1926
297. Tagosodes Asche & Wilson, 1990
298. Tarophagus Zimmerman, 1948
299. Temenites Fennah, 1965
300. Terthron Fennah, 1965
301. Terthronella Vilbaste, 1968
302. Thrasymemnon Fennah, 1965
303. Thriambus Fennah, 1964
304. Thymobares Fennah, 1964
305. Thymodelphax Asche, 1988
306. Toya Distant, 1906
307. Toyalana Asche, 1988
308. Toyoides Matsumura, 1935
309. Tragediana Campodonico, 2017
310. Trichodelphax Vilbaste, 1968
311. Triloris Fennah, 1969
312. Tsaurus Yang, 1989
313. Tumidagena McDermott, 1952
314. Ulanar Fennah, 1975
315. Unkanodella Vilbaste, 1968
316. Unkanodes Fennah, 1956
317. Veo Fennah, 1978
318. Wuyia Ding, 1991
319. Xanthodelphax Wagner, 1963
320. Xinchloriona Ding, 2006
321. Yalia Ding, 2006
322. Yangdelphax Bellis & Donaldson, 2016
323. Yangsinolacme Ding, 2006
324. Yanunka Ishihara, 1952
325. Yichunus Ding, 2006
326. Yukonodelphax Wilson, 1992
327. Zanchetrius Fennah, 1978
328. Zhuangella Ding, 2006
329. Zhudelphax Ding, 2006
