= Athenidelphax =

Scientific classification
- Kingdom: Animalia
- Phylum: Arthropoda
- Clade: Pancrustacea
- Class: Insecta
- Order: Hemiptera
- Suborder: Auchenorrhyncha
- Infraorder: Fulgoromorpha
- Family: Delphacidae
- Subfamily: Delphacinae
- Tribe: Delphacini
- Genus: Athenidelphax; Bartlett, 2025
- Species: A. kennedyae

Binomial name
- Athenidelphax kennedyae Bartlett, 2025

Genus of delphacid planthoppers

Athenidelphax is a Costa Rican genus of delphacid planthoppers in the order Hemiptera. As of 2025, Athenidelphax kennedyae is the only described species in Athenidelphax. It is superficially similar to brachypterous members in the genus Pissonotus, especially Pissonotus albivultus. It was found in the Tapanti National Park in the Cartago Province of Costa Rica.

The name has two parts. It is firstly named after the Greek goddess Athena and secondly the genus Delphax, which translates to "young pig" in Greek. The "i" in between is there to connect the two parts in a pleasing way (euphony). The specific epithet for the species is a tribute to Ashley Kennedy, the entomologist who collected the type specimens and a colleague of the author.
