= Ganus =

Scientific classification
- Domain: Eukaryota
- Kingdom: Animalia
- Phylum: Arthropoda
- Class: Insecta
- Order: Hemiptera
- Suborder: Auchenorrhyncha
- Infraorder: Fulgoromorpha
- Family: Delphacidae
- Subfamily: Delphacinae
- Tribe: Delphacini
- Genus: Ganus; Ding J (2006)

Genus of insects

Ganus is a monotypic genus of planthoppers in the tribe Delphacini, erected by Jinhua Ding in 2006. It contains the species Ganus pallicarinatus from China.
