= Halmyra =

Scientific classification
- Domain: Eukaryota
- Kingdom: Animalia
- Phylum: Arthropoda
- Class: Insecta
- Order: Hemiptera
- Suborder: Auchenorrhyncha
- Infraorder: Fulgoromorpha
- Family: Delphacidae
- Subfamily: Delphacinae
- Tribe: Delphacini
- Genus: Halmyra; Mitjaev ID (1971)

Genus of insects

Halmyra is a monotypic genus of planthoppers in the tribe Delphacini, erected by I. D. Mitjaev in 1971. It contains the species Halmyra aeluropodis from Kazakhstan.
