= Bakerella =

Bakerella is the scientific name of two genera of organisms and may refer to:

- Bakerella, a plant genus in the family Loranthaceae
- Bakerella, a planthopper genus in the family Delphacidae
