= Plagiotropis =

Plagiotropis may refer to:

- Plagiotropis (planthopper), a genus of planthoppers in the family Delphacidae
- Plagiotropis (alga), a genus of algae in the family Bacillariophyceae
- Plagiotropis, a genus of flowering plant in the family Fabaceae; synonym of Swainsona

== See also ==
- Plagiotropism, a tropism at an oblique angle to the direction of the stimulus
