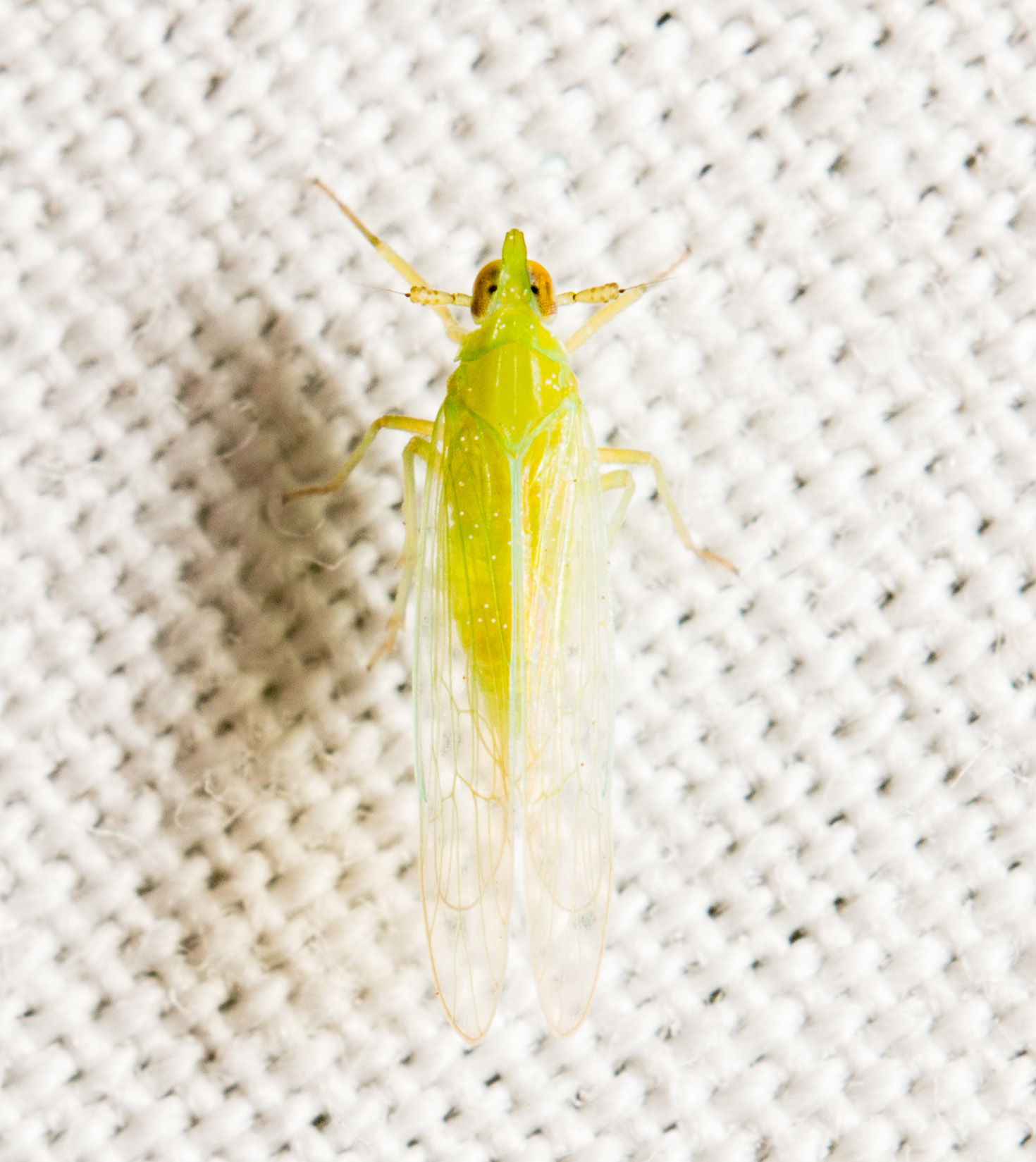

Scientific classification
- Kingdom: Animalia
- Phylum: Arthropoda
- Class: Insecta
- Order: Hemiptera
- Suborder: Auchenorrhyncha
- Infraorder: Fulgoromorpha
- Family: Delphacidae
- Genus: Saccharosydne
- Species: S. saccharivora

Binomial name
- Saccharosydne saccharivora (Westwood, 1833)

Synonyms
- Megamelanus rufivittatus Ball, 1905

= Saccharosydne saccharivora =

Species of true bug

Saccharosydne saccharivora (also generally the west Indian canefly or west Indian sugarcane fulgorid), is a species of delphacid planthopper in the family Delphacidae. It is found in the Caribbean, Central America, North America, Oceania, and South America.
