= Unkana (planthopper) =

Scientific classification
- Kingdom: Animalia
- Phylum: Arthropoda
- Class: Insecta
- Order: Hemiptera
- Family: Delphacidae
- Genus: Unkana Matsumura, 1935

Genus of planthoppers

Unkana (Matsumura, 1935) is an invalid name for a genus of planthoppers in the family Delphacidae. The genus name Unkana was previously coined for a genus of skipper butterflies, so Matsumura's name is permanently unavailable and invalid under the rules of the ICZN.

== Species ==
Unkana contains the following species.

- U. arisana (Matsumura, 1935)
- U. heitonis (Matsumura, 1935)
- U. malayana (Matsumura, 1935)
- U. nigrifacies (Matsumura, 1935)
  - U. n. hyalipennis (Matsumura, 1935)
- U. sakaguchii (Matsumura, 1935)
- U. taiwanella (Matsumura, 1935)
