= The Witch-Cult in Western Europe =

1921 book by Margaret Murray

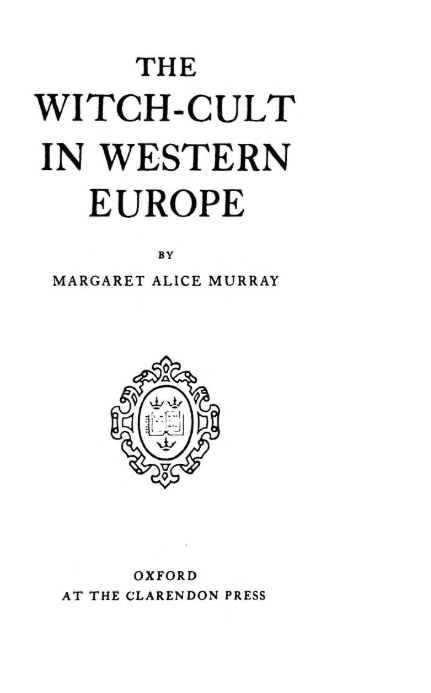
- Title page for The Witch-Cult in Western Europe (1921)
- Author: Margaret Murray
- Genre: Anthropology
- Publication date: 1921

The Witch-Cult in Western Europe is a 1921 anthropological book by Margaret Murray proposing her witch-cult hypothesis. This suggests that the accusations made towards "witches" in Europe were in fact based on a real, though clandestine, pagan religion that worshiped a horned god.

The book was published at the height of the success of Frazer's Golden Bough, and certain university circles subsequently celebrated Murray as the expert on western witchcraft, though her theories were widely discredited by mainstream scholarship. Over the period 1929-1968, she wrote the "Witchcraft" article in successive editions of the Encyclopædia Britannica. In 1962, The Witch-Cult in Western Europe was reprinted by Oxford University Press.

== Overview ==
=== Thesis ===
In this book and the subsequent The God of the Witches (1931), Murray explained her theory as follows.

- Until the 17th century there was a religion, much older than Christianity, which all over Western Europe had supporters both among ordinary people and the ruling classes.
- Central to the worship stood a horned god with two faces, known to the Romans as Janus or Dianus, whose cult was of the type James Frazer described in detail in The Golden Bough.
- The horned god represented the cycle of seasons and harvests. It was believed that he died and periodically returned to life.
- On earth, the horned god was represented by chosen human beings, including some celebrities such as William Rufus, Thomas Becket, Joan of Arc and Gilles de Rais. They each died a tragic death which was secretly a ritual sacrifice to insure the resurrection of the god and the renewal of the earth.
- In the countryside, the witches’ meetings were presided over by the horned god. Christian observers of these rituals might have interpreted the cult of the pre-Christian god Dianus as devil worship.
- This ancient religion had been maintained by a variety of indigenous peoples, small in stature, who were driven out from their land with each new invasion; they were the source of stories about fairies, gnomes and other ‘little people’. These creatures were very shy but were able to pass the knowledge of their religion to ordinary people. The witches were their pupils and thus the heirs of the ancient religion.
- Local covens comprised thirteen members: twelve ordinary men and women, and an officer. All members were required to attend a weekly meeting (named 'esbat' by Murray) as well as the larger Sabbats. The covens maintained strict discipline, and missing a meeting could be severely punished, even with death.
- Through the centuries, the cult's organization and discipline maintained such secrecy that Christianity did not form a clear idea of it until the Reformation. The great witch persecutions were thus Christianity's attack on a covert but powerful rival.

=== Origins ===
Murray's Witch-cult hypothesis was preceded by a similar idea proposed by the German Professor Karl Ernst Jarcke in 1828. Jarcke's hypothesis claimed that the victims of the early modern witch trials were not innocents caught up in a moral panic, but members of a previously unknown pan-European pagan religion which had pre-dated Christianity, who had been persecuted by the Christian Church as a rival religion, and finally driven underground, where the cult had survived in secret until being revealed during the witch trial inquisitions. The idea was later endorsed by German historian Franz Josef Mone and French historian Jules Michelet. In the late 19th century, variations on this hypothesis were adopted by two Americans, Matilda Joslyn Gage and Charles Leland, the latter of whom promoted it in his 1899 book Aradia, or the Gospel of the Witches.

=== Interpretation of witch trial evidence ===
Murray was interested in ascribing naturalistic or religious/ceremonial explanations to some of the more fantastical descriptions found in early modern witch trial records. Murray suggested, based in part on the work of James Frazer in The Golden Bough, that the witches accused in the trials worshiped a pre-Christian god associated with forests and the natural world. Murray identified this god as Janus (or Dianus, following Frazer's suggested etymology), a "Horned God" of the wilds described as a horned Satan in witch trial confessions.

Because those accused of witchcraft often described witches' meetings as involving sexual orgies with Satan, she suggested that a male priest representing Dianus would have been present at each coven meeting, dressed in horns and animals skins, who engaged in sexual acts with the gathered women. Murray further interpreted descriptions of sexual intercourse with Satan as being cold and painful to mean that the priest would often use artificial implements on the witches when he became too exhausted to continue.

Unlike most modern forms of religious witchcraft, Murray's conception of the witch-cult was therefore strictly patriarchal. In her hypothesis, witches worshiped a single male god, and though the rituals included a female known as "the Maiden", Murray did not consider her to represent a goddess. In this way, Murray's hypothesis, based primarily on her interpretations of witch trial records, differed strongly from Leland's belief in a goddess-centered witch-cult focused on Diana and Aradia, derived from supposed rural Italian folk practices.

One key aspect of Murray's witch-cult hypothesis, later adopted by Wicca, was that witches had originally been involved in benevolent fertility-promoting magic rather than malevolent hexing and cursing as traditionally portrayed. In testimony from the early modern witch trials, Murray encountered numerous confessions of curses and nefarious activities. Seeking to fit these into a framework of witchcraft as a pagan nature-focused religion, Murray posited that these accounts were actually misinterpretations of benevolent actions, originating under duress during the trials, or from practitioners themselves who had gradually forgotten or changed the original meaning. For example, Murray interpreted Isobel Gowdie's confession of cursing a farm field by setting loose a toad pulling a miniature plough as originally being a blessing for fertility of the crops. Murray stated that these acts were "misunderstood by the recorders and probably by the witches themselves." Such interpretations created for the first time the idea of the witch as a practitioner of good magic promoting the fertility of people and land. This ran counter to previous ideas about witchcraft in history and folklore: even Leland's Aradia depicted witches not as benevolent, but rather as revolutionary figures who used curses and black magic to attack their persecutors, the upper classes and the Catholic Church.

Murray combined testimony from several witch trials to conclude that witches met four times a year at "Sabbaths". One piece of testimony suggested that covens were usually composed of 13 witches, led by a male priest dressed in animal skins, horns, and fork-toed shoes (a naturalistic explanation for accused witches' descriptions of Satan). Murray derived the name "Sabbath" from French s'esbattre, meaning "to frolic". Most historians disagree, arguing instead that the organizers of the witch trials used such words as "Sabbath" and "synagogue" to associate witchcraft with the religion of Judaism.

== Reception ==
The idea of a witch cult surviving in secret until early modern times was quickly dismissed by historians. From the 1920s on, Murray's theory was debunked by professional historians such as George Lincoln Burr, Hugh Trevor-Roper, and more recently Keith Thomas. Most mainstream folklorists, including most of Murray's contemporaries, did not take her theories seriously. Rather than accept Murray's naturalistic explanation for the magical feats and rituals ascribed to witches during the early modern trials, other scholars argued that these were pure fictions requiring no naturalistic explanation. The supposed details of the rituals and witchcraft practices described in trial records were simply invented by victims under torture or threat of torture, based on the kinds of diabolic rites that clergy of the time would have expected to hear about. Almost all of Murray's peers regarded the witch-cult theory as fanciful misinterpretation of the source material. Modern scholars have noted that Murray was highly selective in the evidence she pulled from trial accounts, favoring details that supported her theory and ignoring those that could not be explained naturalistically. Murray often contradicted herself, citing accounts in one chapter as evidence for naturalistic explanations while using exactly the same passages to argue opposite points in the next.

Modern scholars of the history of witchcraft agree that it is very unlikely that such a witch-cult really existed, or that this cult or religion came to an end in the seventeenth century because of Christian persecutions. One of these modern critics, social anthropologist Alan Macfarlane, criticized Murray in his book Witchcraft Prosecutions in Essex, 1500-1600: A Sociological Analysis. He maintains that Murray erroneously jumbled together all sorts of European folklore out of context, and had credulously believed the witch confessions. From his own research on witchcraft in Essex, Macfarlane found no traces of a Sabbath, Coven or the demonic pact, except perhaps in the witch trials of 1645, nor of any pagan underground cult or any group calling themselves witches. Likewise Keith Thomas criticises Murray for her selective use of evidence and 'the deficiencies of her historical method'.

A few scholars, however, argued that despite Murray's exaggerated claims, there could be some truth in her hypothesis. Arno Rune Berg noted in his 1947 book Witches, Demons and Fertility a number of "ordinary" elements in descriptions of the witches' Sabbath. This could be evidence of actual meetings, later transformed into imaginative phantasmagoria. Emmanuel Le Roy Ladurie dismissed most of Murray's arguments as "near nonsense", but he also pointed to Carlo Ginzburg's discovery in the 1960s of the Italian benandanti, folk magicians who practiced anti-witchcraft magic and were themselves put on trial for witchcraft, as evidence that some accusations of witchcraft were not based entirely on panicked fantasy. Ginzburg distanced himself from Murray, though he also argued that the benandanti were a continuation of a pre-Christian shamanic tradition, an assertion doubted by other scholars.

== Influence ==
Despite criticisms of her work, Murray was invited to write the entry on "witchcraft" for the 1929 edition of the Encyclopædia Britannica, which was reprinted for decades, last appearing in the 1969 edition. Rather than explaining the historical consensus on the witch trials, Murray promoted her own hypothesis, presenting it as fact. As a result, according to folklorist Jacqueline Simpson, Murray's ideas became "so entrenched in popular culture that they will probably never be uprooted."

Charles Leland's idea of an 'old religion' and Murray's surviving pagan cult heavily influenced writers such as Robert Graves in his book The White Goddess, as well as subsequent 20th century modern witchcraft movements like Wicca.

Feminist scholars have also taken up a variant on Murray's thesis about a persecuted witch religion in Medieval Europe, not centering on a Horned God but a Mother Goddess whose worship reached back to the Paleolithic era.

In the story "The Call of Cthulhu," H.P. Lovecraft cites Murray's book and her Britannica entry as inspiration for the idea of an underground Cthulhu cult.

== Sources ==
- Doyle White, Ethan (2016). Wicca: History, Belief, and Community in Modern Pagan Witchcraft. Brighton: Sussex Academic Press. ISBN 978-1-84519-754-4.
- Hutton, Ronald (1999). The Triumph of the Moon: A History of Modern Pagan Witchcraft. Oxford University Press. ISBN 0-19-820744-1.
