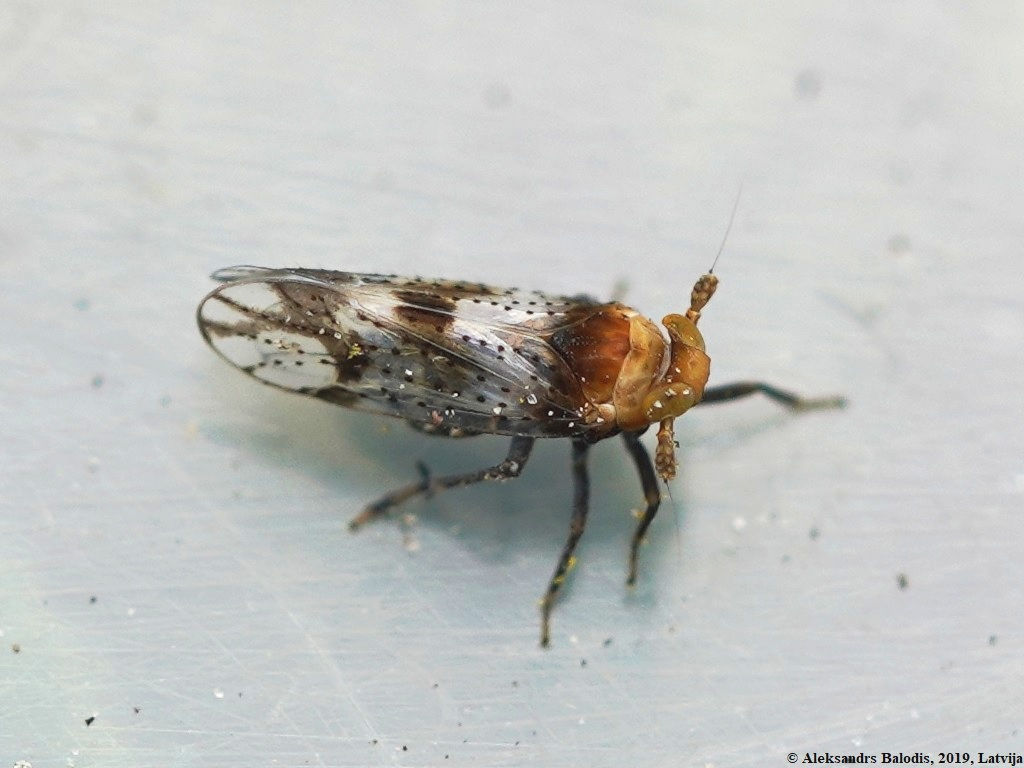
- Conomelus anceps

Scientific classification
- Domain: Eukaryota
- Kingdom: Animalia
- Phylum: Arthropoda
- Class: Insecta
- Order: Hemiptera
- Suborder: Auchenorrhyncha
- Infraorder: Fulgoromorpha
- Family: Delphacidae
- Tribe: Delphacini
- Genus: Conomelus; Fieber, 1866

= Conomelus =

Genus of true bugs

Conomelus is a genus of true bugs belonging to the family Delphacidae.

The genus was first described by Fieber in 1866.

The species of this genus are found in Europe.

Species include:

- Conomelus anceps (Germar, 1821)
