= Achorotile =

Scientific classification
- Domain: Eukaryota
- Kingdom: Animalia
- Phylum: Arthropoda
- Class: Insecta
- Order: Hemiptera
- Suborder: Auchenorrhyncha
- Infraorder: Fulgoromorpha
- Family: Delphacidae
- Tribe: Delphacini
- Genus: Achorotile; Fieber, 1866

Genus of true bugs

Achorotile is a genus of true bugs belonging to the family Delphacidae.

The species of this genus are found in Europe and North America.

Species:

- Achorotile acuta Scudder, 1963
- Achorotile albosignata (Dahlbom, 1850)
- Achorotile angulata Beamer, 1954
- Achorotile apicata Hamilton, 2002
- Achorotile caecianta Emeljanov, 1976
- Achorotile coloradensis Beamer, 1954
- Achorotile curvata Beamer, 1954
- Achorotile distincta Scudder, 1963
- Achorotile foveata Spooner, 1912
- Achorotile longicornis (Sahlberg, 1871)
- Achorotile nobilis Dlabola, 1961
- Achorotile pediforma Beamer, 1954
- Achorotile stylata Beamer, 1954
- Achorotile subarctica Scudder, 1963
- Achorotile transbaicalica Kusnezov, 1929
