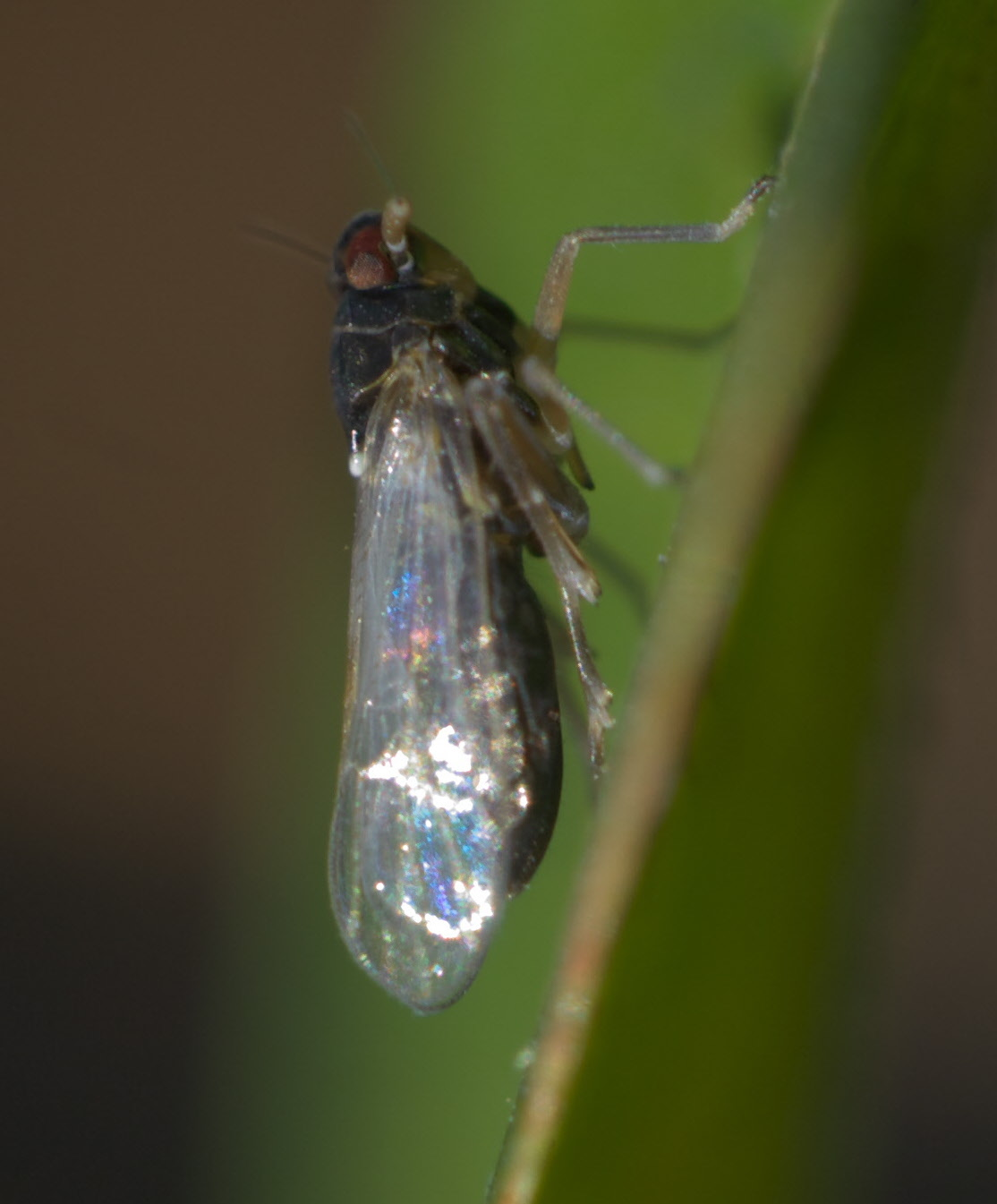
- Isodelphax basivitta

Scientific classification
- Domain: Eukaryota
- Kingdom: Animalia
- Phylum: Arthropoda
- Class: Insecta
- Order: Hemiptera
- Suborder: Auchenorrhyncha
- Infraorder: Fulgoromorpha
- Family: Delphacidae
- Subfamily: Delphacinae
- Genus: Isodelphax; Fennah, 1963

= Isodelphax =

Genus of true bugs

Isodelphax is a genus of delphacid planthoppers in the family Delphacidae. There are at least 2 described species in Isodelphax.

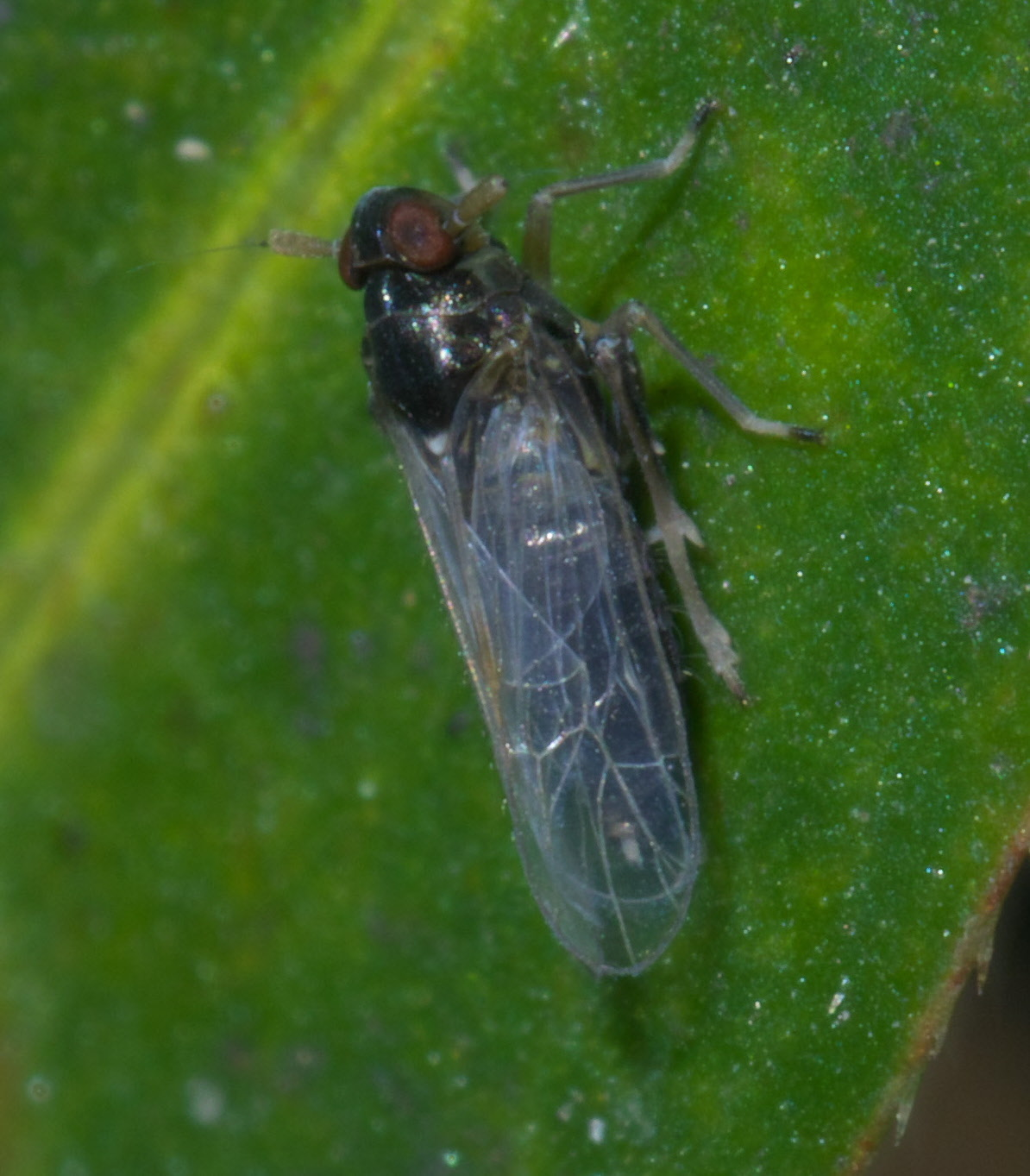
Isodelphax basivitta

== Species ==
- Isodelphax basivitta (Van Duzee, 1909)
- Isodelphax nigridorsum
