= Megadelphax =

Scientific classification
- Kingdom: Animalia
- Phylum: Arthropoda
- Class: Insecta
- Order: Hemiptera
- Suborder: Auchenorrhyncha
- Infraorder: Fulgoromorpha
- Family: Delphacidae
- Tribe: Delphacini
- Genus: Megadelphax; Wagner, 1963

Genus of true bugs

Megadelphax is a genus of true bugs belonging to the family Delphacidae.

The species of this genus are found in Europe.

Species:

- Megadelphax amoena Logvinenko, 1977
- Megadelphax bidentatus (Anufriev, 1970)
