= Aplanodes (planthopper) =

Scientific classification
- Domain: Eukaryota
- Kingdom: Animalia
- Phylum: Arthropoda
- Class: Insecta
- Order: Hemiptera
- Suborder: Auchenorrhyncha
- Infraorder: Fulgoromorpha
- Family: Delphacidae
- Tribe: Delphacini
- Genus: Aplanodes; Fennah, 1965

Genus of true bugs

Aplanodes is a genus of true bugs belonging to the family Delphacidae.

Species:

- Aplanodes australiae (Kirkaldy, 1907)
