= Megamelanus =

Scientific classification
- Kingdom: Animalia
- Phylum: Arthropoda
- Class: Insecta
- Order: Hemiptera
- Suborder: Auchenorrhyncha
- Infraorder: Fulgoromorpha
- Family: Delphacidae
- Subfamily: Delphacinae
- Genus: Megamelanus; Ball, 1902

Genus of true bugs

Megamelanus is a genus of delphacid planthoppers in the family Delphacidae. There is at least one described species in Megamelanus, M. bicolor.
