= Florodelphax =

Scientific classification
- Kingdom: Animalia
- Phylum: Arthropoda
- Clade: Pancrustacea
- Class: Insecta
- Order: Hemiptera
- Suborder: Auchenorrhyncha
- Infraorder: Fulgoromorpha
- Family: Delphacidae
- Tribe: Delphacini
- Genus: Florodelphax; Vilbaste, 1968

Genus of true bugs

Florodelphax is a genus of planthopper belonging to the family Delphacidae.

The genus was first described by Juhan Vilbaste in 1968.

The species of this genus are found in Europe.

Species:

- Florodelphax leptosoma
- Florodelphax paryphasma (Flor, 1861)
