= Megamelodes =

Scientific classification
- Domain: Eukaryota
- Kingdom: Animalia
- Phylum: Arthropoda
- Class: Insecta
- Order: Hemiptera
- Suborder: Auchenorrhyncha
- Infraorder: Fulgoromorpha
- Family: Delphacidae
- Subfamily: Delphacinae
- Tribe: Delphacini
- Genus: Megamelodes; Le Quesne, 1960

Genus of true bugs

External image
- Images at iNaturalist

Megamelodes is a genus of mostly European planthoppers erected by W. J. Le Quesne in 1960. Some authorities place this genus as incertae sedis within the Delphacidae, or it is included in the tribe Delphacini.

The species M. quadrimaculatus can be found locally in marshy areas across the southern part of England and Wales.

== Species ==
BioLib includes:

1. Megamelodes lequesnei Wagner, 1963
2. Megamelodes quadrimaculatus (Signoret, 1865) (synonym M. fieberi (Scott, 1870))
3. Megamelodes venosus (Germar, 1830)
