= Anakelisia =

Scientific classification
- Kingdom: Animalia
- Phylum: Arthropoda
- Class: Insecta
- Order: Hemiptera
- Suborder: Auchenorrhyncha
- Infraorder: Fulgoromorpha
- Family: Delphacidae
- Subfamily: Kelisiinae
- Genus: Anakelisia; Wagner, 1963

Genus of true bugs

Anakelisia is a genus of true bugs belonging to the family Delphacidae.

The genus was first described by Wagner in 1963.

The species of this genus are found in Europe and Australia.

Species:

- Anakelisia fasciata (Kirschbaum, 1868)
- Anakelisia perspicillata (Boheman, 1845)
