= Sardia =

Scientific classification
- Domain: Eukaryota
- Kingdom: Animalia
- Phylum: Arthropoda
- Class: Insecta
- Order: Hemiptera
- Suborder: Auchenorrhyncha
- Infraorder: Fulgoromorpha
- Family: Delphacidae
- Tribe: Delphacini
- Genus: Sardia; Melichar, 1903

Genus of insects

Sardia is a genus of true bugs belonging to the family Delphacidae.

The species of this genus are found in Australia.

Species:

- Sardia balakotiensis Khalid, 1997
- Sardia campbelli Muir, 1921
- Sardia campusii Khalid, 1997
- Sardia gilgitennis Khalid, 1997
- Sardia gilgitensis Khalid, 1997
- Sardia rostrata Melichar, 1903
- Sardia sialkotensis Khalid, 1997
- Sardia triformis Jacobi, 1941
- Sardia vindex Fennah, 1969
