= Vizcaya (planthopper) =

Scientific classification
- Domain: Eukaryota
- Kingdom: Animalia
- Phylum: Arthropoda
- Class: Insecta
- Order: Hemiptera
- Suborder: Auchenorrhyncha
- Infraorder: Fulgoromorpha
- Family: Delphacidae
- Subfamily: Vizcayinae
- Genus: Vizcaya; Muir, 1917

Genus of planthoppers

Vizcaya is a genus of planthoppers in the family Delphacidae. It is the type genus of the subfamily Vizcayinae Asche, 1990; species have been found in southern India, Indo-China and Malesia.

== Species ==
Fulgoromorpha Lists On the Web includes the following:

- Vizcaya adornata Asche, 1990
- Vizcaya aschei Liang, 2002
- Vizcaya bakeri Muir, 1917 – type species (locality Philippines)
- Vizcaya latifrons Liang, 2002
- Vizcaya lombokensis Liang, 2002
- Vizcaya longispinosa Liang, 2002
- Vizcaya orea Asche, 1990
- Vizcaya piccola Asche, 1990
- Vizcaya vindaloa Asche, 1990
