= Garaga =

Scientific classification
- Kingdom: Animalia
- Phylum: Arthropoda
- Clade: Pancrustacea
- Class: Insecta
- Order: Hemiptera
- Suborder: Auchenorrhyncha
- Infraorder: Fulgoromorpha
- Family: Delphacidae
- Tribe: Delphacini
- Genus: Garaga; Anufriev, 1977

Genus of planthoppers

Garaga is a genus of mostly Asian planthoppers belonging to the tribe Delphacini.

== Species ==
The following species are recognized in this genus:

- Garaga flagelliformis Ding, 2006
- Garaga hailongensis Ding & Zhang, 1990
- Garaga miscanthi Ding et al., 1994
- Garaga nagaragawana (Matsumura, 1900)
- Garaga orchidensis Yang, 1989
- Garaga pallida Yang, 1989
- Garaga tricuspis Ding, 2006
- Garaga trifida Asche, 1988
- Garaga trifurca Guo & Liang, 2004
- Garaga vilbastei (Choe, 1981)
