= Chloriona =

Scientific classification
- Domain: Eukaryota
- Kingdom: Animalia
- Phylum: Arthropoda
- Class: Insecta
- Order: Hemiptera
- Suborder: Auchenorrhyncha
- Infraorder: Fulgoromorpha
- Family: Delphacidae
- Subfamily: Delphacinae
- Genus: Chloriona; Fieber, 1866

Genus of planthoppers

Chloriona is a genus of planthoppers belonging to the family Delphacidae.

The genus was first described by Fieber in 1866.

The species of this genus are found in Eurasia.

Species:

- Chloriona chinai
- Chloriona glaucescens
- Chloriona smaragdula
- Chloriona stenoptera
- Chloriona vasconica
