= Toya (planthopper) =

Scientific classification
- Domain: Eukaryota
- Kingdom: Animalia
- Phylum: Arthropoda
- Class: Insecta
- Order: Hemiptera
- Suborder: Auchenorrhyncha
- Infraorder: Fulgoromorpha
- Family: Delphacidae
- Subfamily: Delphacinae
- Genus: Toya; Distant, 1906

Genus of true bugs

Toya is a genus of delphacid planthoppers in the family Delphacidae. There are at least 40 described species in Toya.

== Species ==
These 49 species belong to the genus Toya:

- Toya actaeon (Fennah, 1958)^{i c g}
- Toya attenuata Distant, 1906^{i c g}
- Toya beninu Fennah, 1975^{i c g}
- Toya boxi (Muir and Giffard, 1924)^{i c g}
- Toya bridwelli (Muir, 1920)^{i c g}
- Toya canidia Fennah, 1969^{i c g}
- Toya ceresensis (Muir, 1929)^{i c g}
- Toya complexa (Muir, 1929)^{i c g}
- Toya cularo Fennah, 1975^{i c g}
- Toya demophoon Fennah, 1964^{i c g}
- Toya dietrichi Gonzon and Bartlett, 2008^{i c g}
- Toya dryope (Kirkaldy, 1907)^{i c g}
- Toya fulva (Yang, 1989)^{i c g}
- Toya fusca Melichar, 1914^{i c g}
- Toya goliai Gonzon and Bartlett, 2008^{i c g}
- Toya hessei (Muir, 1929)^{i c g}
- Toya hispidula (Lindberg, 1954)^{i c g}
- Toya iaxartes (Fennah, 1959)^{i c g}
- Toya ibiturca Asche, 1980^{i c g}
- Toya idonea (Beamer, 1947)^{i c g b}
- Toya larymna Fennah, 1975^{i c g}
- Toya lazulis (Kirkaldy, 1907)^{i c g}
- Toya lima (Yang, 1989)^{i c g}
- Toya lyraeformis (Matsumura, 1900)^{c g}
- Toya mahensis (Distant, 1917)^{i c g}
- Toya mamurra Fennah, 1969^{i c g}
- Toya mandonius Fennah, 1969^{i c g}
- Toya mastanabal Fennah, 1969^{i c g}
- Toya menedema Fennah, 1969^{c g}
- Toya menedemus Fennah, 1969^{i}
- Toya minutula (Melichar, 1903)^{i c g}
- Toya narcissus Fennah, 1969^{i c g}
- Toya nigeriensis (Muir, 1920)^{c}
- Toya nigra (Crawford, 1914)^{i c g}
- Toya obtusangula (Linnavuori, 1957)^{i c g}
- Toya peruda Fennah, 1975^{i c g}
- Toya recurva Gonzon and Bartlett, 2008^{i c g}
- Toya salambo Fennah, 1964^{i c g}
- Toya siaka Fennah, 1975^{i c g}
- Toya simulans (Dlabola, 1958)^{i c g}
- Toya suezensis (Matsumura, 1910)^{i c g}
- Toya superba (Emeljanov, 1964)^{i c g}
- Toya tateyamaella (Matsumura, 1935)^{c g}
- Toya terryi (Muir, 1917)^{c}
- Toya thomasseti (Muir, 1925)^{i c g}
- Toya trophonius Fennah, 1967^{c g}
- Toya tuberculosa (Distant, 1916)^{i c g}
- Toya venilia (Fennah, 1959)^{i c g}
- Toya yanoi (Ishihara, 1952)^{i}

Data sources: i = ITIS, c = Catalogue of Life, g = GBIF, b = Bugguide.net
