= Paraliburnia =

Scientific classification
- Domain: Eukaryota
- Kingdom: Animalia
- Phylum: Arthropoda
- Class: Insecta
- Order: Hemiptera
- Suborder: Auchenorrhyncha
- Infraorder: Fulgoromorpha
- Family: Delphacidae
- Subfamily: Delphacinae
- Genus: Paraliburnia; Jensen-Haarup, 1917

Genus of true bugs

Paraliburnia is a genus of delphacid planthoppers in the family Delphacidae. There are about seven described species in Paraliburnia.

== Species ==
These seven species belong to the genus Paraliburnia:

- Paraliburnia adela (Flor, 1861)
- Paraliburnia clypealis (Sahlberg, 1871)
- Paraliburnia furcata Hamilton, 2002
- Paraliburnia jacobseni Jensen-Haarup, 1917
- Paraliburnia kilmani (Van Duzee, 1897)
- Paraliburnia lecartus Hamilton, 2002
- Paraliburnia lugubrina (Boheman, 1847)
