= Perkinsiella =

Scientific classification
- Domain: Eukaryota
- Kingdom: Animalia
- Phylum: Arthropoda
- Class: Insecta
- Order: Hemiptera
- Suborder: Auchenorrhyncha
- Infraorder: Fulgoromorpha
- Family: Delphacidae
- Tribe: Delphacini
- Genus: Perkinsiella; Kirkaldy, 1903

Genus of planthoppers

Perkinsiella is a genus of delphacid planthoppers in the family Delphacidae. There are more than 30 described species in Perkinsiella.

== Species ==
These 35 species belong to the genus Perkinsiella:

- Perkinsiella amboinensis Muir, 1911
- Perkinsiella bakeri Muir, 1916
- Perkinsiella bicoloris Muir, 1911
- Perkinsiella bigemina Ding, 1980
- Perkinsiella boreon Fennah, 1979
- Perkinsiella bulli Fennah, 1979
- Perkinsiella diagoras Fennah, 1979
- Perkinsiella dorsata (Melichar, 1905)
- Perkinsiella facialis (Distant, 1912)
- Perkinsiella falcipennis Fennah, 1979
- Perkinsiella fuscipennis Muir, 1916
- Perkinsiella graminicida Kirkaldy, 1906
- Perkinsiella insignis (Distant, 1912)
- Perkinsiella lalokensis Muir, 1911
- Perkinsiella lineata Muir, 1916
- Perkinsiella macrinus Fennah, 1979
- Perkinsiella manilae Muir, 1917
- Perkinsiella miriamae Emeljanov, 1987
- Perkinsiella mycon Fennah, 1979
- Perkinsiella neoinsignis Muir, 1923
- Perkinsiella pallidula Muir, 1911
- Perkinsiella papuensis Muir, 1911
- Perkinsiella pseudosinensis Muir, 1916
- Perkinsiella rattlei Muir, 1911
- Perkinsiella rivularis Linnavuori, 1964
- Perkinsiella saccharicida Kirkaldy, 1903 (sugarcane planthopper)
- Perkinsiella saccharivora Muir, 1916
- Perkinsiella sinensis Kirkaldy, 1907
- Perkinsiella thompsoni Muir, 1913
- Perkinsiella variegata Muir, 1911
- Perkinsiella vastatrix (Breddin, 1896)
- Perkinsiella vitalisi Muir, 1925
- Perkinsiella vitiensis Kirkaldy, 1906
- Perkinsiella yakushimensis Ishihara, 1954
- Perkinsiella yuanjiangensis Ding, 1985
