= Bakerella (planthopper) =

Scientific classification
- Domain: Eukaryota
- Kingdom: Animalia
- Phylum: Arthropoda
- Class: Insecta
- Order: Hemiptera
- Suborder: Auchenorrhyncha
- Infraorder: Fulgoromorpha
- Family: Delphacidae
- Tribe: Delphacini
- Genus: Bakerella; Crawford, 1914

Type species
- Bakerella maculata Crawford, 1914

Genus of true bugs

Bakerella is a genus of North American planthoppers in the family Delphacidae. Species include:

- Bakerella angulata Beamer, 1950
- Bakerella bidens Beamer, 1945
- Bakerella bullata Beamer, 1950
- Bakerella cinerea Beamer, 1945
- Bakerella cornigera Beamer, 1950
- Bakerella fusca Beamer, 1945
- Bakerella maculata Crawford, 1914 – type species
- Bakerella minuta Beamer, 1950
- Bakerella muscotana Beamer, 1946
- Bakerella pediforma Beamer, 1950
- Bakerella penefusca Beamer, 1950
- Bakerella rotundifrons Beamer, 1945
- Bakerella spinifera Beamer, 1950
