= Euconomelus =

Scientific classification
- Domain: Eukaryota
- Kingdom: Animalia
- Phylum: Arthropoda
- Class: Insecta
- Order: Hemiptera
- Suborder: Auchenorrhyncha
- Infraorder: Fulgoromorpha
- Family: Delphacidae
- Genus: Euconomelus; Haupt, 1929

Genus of true bugs

Euconomelus is a genus of true bugs belonging to the family Delphacidae.

The species of this genus are found in Europe.

Species:

- Euconomelus lepidus (Boheman, 1847)
