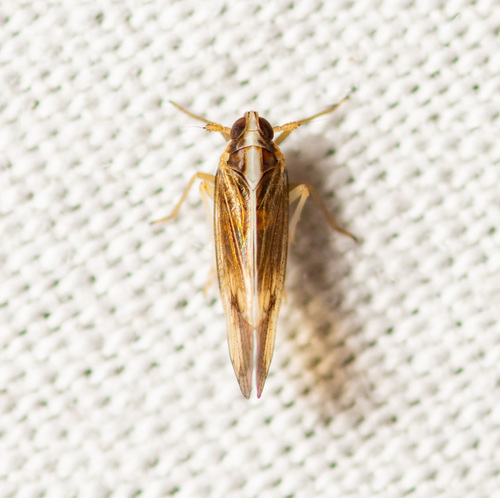
- Tagosodes orizicolus in Austin, Texas

Scientific classification
- Domain: Eukaryota
- Kingdom: Animalia
- Phylum: Arthropoda
- Class: Insecta
- Order: Hemiptera
- Suborder: Auchenorrhyncha
- Infraorder: Fulgoromorpha
- Family: Delphacidae
- Genus: Tagosodes; Asche & Wilson, 1990

= Tagosodes =

Genus of true bugs

Tagosodes is a genus of true bugs belonging to the family Delphacidae.

The species of this genus are found in America.

Species:

- Tagosodes baina (Ding & Kuoh, 1981)
- Tagosodes candiope (Fennah, 1975)
