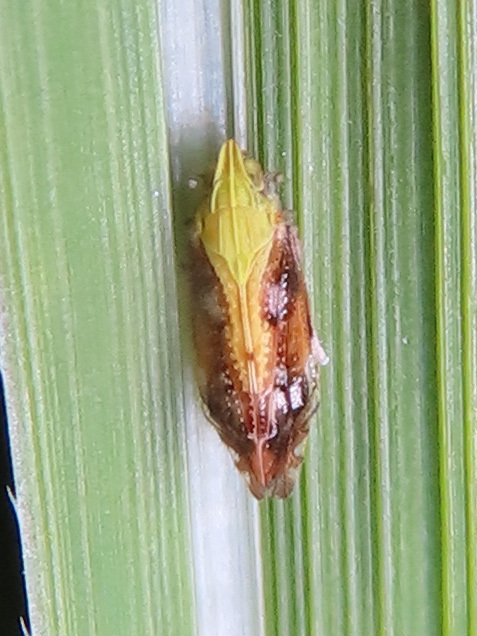
- Tropidocephala brunnipennis

Scientific classification
- Kingdom: Animalia
- Phylum: Arthropoda
- Clade: Pancrustacea
- Class: Insecta
- Order: Hemiptera
- Suborder: Auchenorrhyncha
- Infraorder: Fulgoromorpha
- Family: Delphacidae
- Subfamily: Delphacinae
- Tribe: Tropidocephalini
- Genus: Tropidocephala; Stål, 1853

Synonyms
- Conicoda Matsumura, 1900; Ectopiopterygodelphax Kirkaldy, 1906; Smara Distant, 1906

= Tropidocephala =

Genus of true bugs

Tropidocephala is a genus of planthopper bugs, typical of the tribe Tropidocephalini. Species have been recorded from Africa, Europe and (mostly tropical) Asia.

== Species ==
The World Auchenorrhyncha Database (WAD) includes:

1. Tropidocephala amboinensis Muir, 1913
2. Tropidocephala andropogonis Horváth, 1895
3. Tropidocephala andunna Kuoh, 1979
4. Tropidocephala arcas Fennah, 1988
5. Tropidocephala atrata (Distant, 1906)
6. Tropidocephala baguioensis Muir, 1916
7. Tropidocephala bironis Matsumura, 1907
8. Tropidocephala breviceps Matsumura, 1907
9. Tropidocephala brunnipennis Signoret, 1860
10. Tropidocephala dimidia Yang & Yang, 1986
11. Tropidocephala dingi Sun, Yang & Chen, 2014
12. Tropidocephala dryas Kirkaldy, 1907
13. Tropidocephala erianthi Dlabola, 1963
14. Tropidocephala eximia (Kirkaldy, 1906)
15. Tropidocephala festiva (Distant, 1906)
16. Tropidocephala flava Melichar, 1914
17. Tropidocephala flaviceps Stål, 1855 - type species
18. Tropidocephala flavovittata Matsumura, 1907
19. Tropidocephala formosana Matsumura, 1910
20. Tropidocephala gracilis Matsumura, 1907
21. Tropidocephala grata Yang & Yang, 1986
22. Tropidocephala insperata Yang, 1989
23. Tropidocephala jiawenna Kuoh, 1979
24. Tropidocephala lamellata Lv, Li, Zhang, Yang & Chen, 2025
25. Tropidocephala longispina Ding, 1982
26. Tropidocephala luteola Distant, 1912
27. Tropidocephala malayana Matsumura, 1907
28. Tropidocephala neoamboinensis Muir, 1913
29. Tropidocephala neoelegans Muir, 1913
30. Tropidocephala neogracilis Muir, 1913
31. Tropidocephala nigra (Matsumura, 1900)
32. Tropidocephala nigrocacuminis Muir, 1916
33. Tropidocephala orientalis Ding, 2006
34. Tropidocephala prasina Melichar, 1902
35. Tropidocephala prolixa Guo & Liang, 2005
36. Tropidocephala pseudobaguioensis Muir, 1916
37. Tropidocephala pulchella Dubovsky, 1966
38. Tropidocephala russa Ding, 2006
39. Tropidocephala saccharicola Muir, 1913
40. Tropidocephala saccharivorella Matsumura, 1907
41. Tropidocephala serendiba (Melichar, 1903)
42. Tropidocephala simaoensis Ding, 2006
43. Tropidocephala sinica Ding, 2006
44. Tropidocephala sinuosa Yang & Yang, 1986
45. Tropidocephala speciosa (Bierman, 1908)
46. Tropidocephala terminalis Jacobi, 1941
47. Tropidocephala touchi Kuoh, 1979
48. Tropidocephala tuberipennis (Mulsant & Rey, 1855)
49. Tropidocephala tyro Fennah, 1988
50. Tropidocephala ucalegon Fennah, 1988
51. Tropidocephala umbrina Linnavuori, 1973
52. Tropidocephala viridula (Bierman, 1908)
53. Tropidocephala xelus Fennah, 1988
54. Tropidocephala yichangensis Ding, 2006
55. Tropidocephala yunnanensis Lv, Li, Zhang, Yang & Chen, 2025
56. Tropidocephala zeno Fennah, 1988
