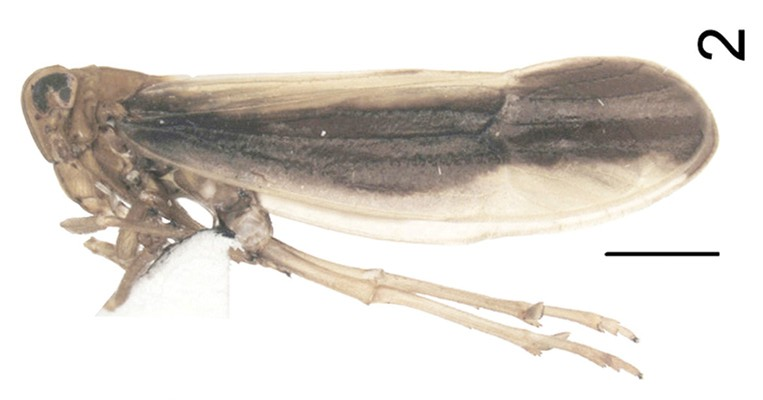
- Adult male K. taibaiensis

Scientific classification
- Kingdom: Animalia
- Phylum: Arthropoda
- Class: Insecta
- Order: Hemiptera
- Suborder: Auchenorrhyncha
- Infraorder: Fulgoromorpha
- Family: Delphacidae
- Tribe: Delphacini
- Genus: Kakuna; Matsumura, 1935

Type species
- Kakuna kuwayamai Matsumura, 1935

Species
- K. kuwayamai Matsumura, 1935; K. lii Chen & Yang, 2010; K. nonspina Chen & Yang, 2010; K. taibaiensis Ren & Qin, 2014; K. yushaniae (Yang, 1989); K. zhongtuana Chen & Yang, 2010

Synonyms
- Parametopina Yang 1989

= Kakuna (planthopper) =

Genus of true bugs

Kakuna is a genus of planthopper in the family Delphacidae. It is found in China and Japan. The genus was circumscribed in 1935 by Shōnen Matsumura.
