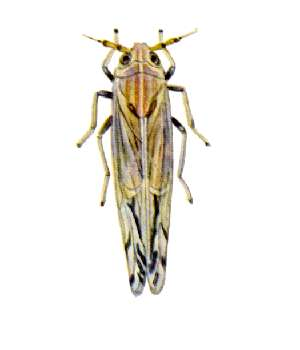
- Peregrinus maidis

Scientific classification
- Domain: Eukaryota
- Kingdom: Animalia
- Phylum: Arthropoda
- Class: Insecta
- Order: Hemiptera
- Suborder: Auchenorrhyncha
- Infraorder: Fulgoromorpha
- Family: Delphacidae
- Genus: Peregrinus; Kirkaldy, 1904

= Peregrinus (planthopper) =

Genus of insects

Peregrinus is a genus of planthoppers belonging to the family Delphacidae.

The species of this genus are found in America, Africa and Malesia.

Species:

- Peregrinus iocasta (Fennah, 1958)
- Peregrinus maidis (Ashmead, 1890)
