= Stiromoides =

Scientific classification
- Kingdom: Animalia
- Phylum: Arthropoda
- Class: Insecta
- Order: Hemiptera
- Suborder: Auchenorrhyncha
- Infraorder: Fulgoromorpha
- Family: Delphacidae
- Genus: Stiromoides; Vilbaste, 1971

Genus of true bugs

Stiromoides is a genus of true bugs belonging to the family Delphacidae.

Species:

- Stiromoides maculiceps (Horváth, 1903)
