= Saccharosydne =

Scientific classification
- Domain: Eukaryota
- Kingdom: Animalia
- Phylum: Arthropoda
- Class: Insecta
- Order: Hemiptera
- Suborder: Auchenorrhyncha
- Infraorder: Fulgoromorpha
- Family: Delphacidae
- Tribe: Saccharosydnini
- Genus: Saccharosydne; Kirkaldy, 1907

Genus of true bugs

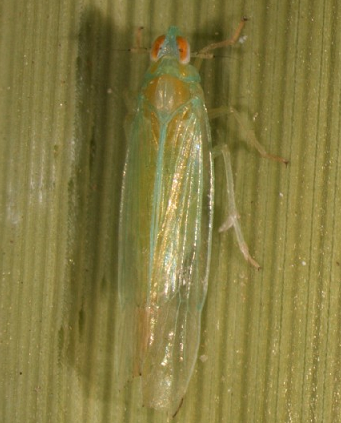
Saccharosydne subandina (adult)

Saccharosydne is a genus of delphacid planthoppers in the family Delphacidae. There are about nine described species in Saccharosydne.

== Species ==
These nine species belong to the genus Saccharosydne:

- Saccharosydne brevirostris Muir, 1926
- Saccharosydne gracillis Muir, 1926
- Saccharosydne ornatipennis Muir, 1926
- Saccharosydne procerus Matsumura, 1924
- Saccharosydne rostrifrons (Crawford, 1914)
- Saccharosydne saccharivora (Westwood, 1833) (west Indian canefly)
- Saccharosydne subandina Remes Lenicov & Rossi Batiz, 2010
- Saccharosydne viridis Muir, 1926
