= Oncodelphax =

Scientific classification
- Kingdom: Animalia
- Phylum: Arthropoda
- Class: Insecta
- Order: Hemiptera
- Suborder: Auchenorrhyncha
- Infraorder: Fulgoromorpha
- Family: Delphacidae
- Genus: Oncodelphax; Wagner, 1963

Genus of true bugs

Oncodelphax is a genus of true bugs belonging to the family Delphacidae.

The species of this genus are found in Europe.

Species:

- Oncodelphax improvisa Emeljanov, 1982
- Oncodelphax micula Emeljanov, 1982
