= Perkinsiella saccharicida =

Scientific classification
- Domain: Eukaryota
- Kingdom: Animalia
- Phylum: Arthropoda
- Class: Insecta
- Order: Hemiptera
- Suborder: Auchenorrhyncha
- Infraorder: Fulgoromorpha
- Family: Delphacidae
- Genus: Perkinsiella
- Species: P. saccharicida

Binomial name
- Perkinsiella saccharicida Kirkaldy, 1903

Species of planthopper

Perkinsiella saccharicida (known commonly as the sugarcane planthopper, sugarcane delphacid, and sugarcane leafhopper) is a species of delphacid planthopper in the family Delphacidae. It is found in Africa, Australia, North America, Oceania, and Southern Asia.
