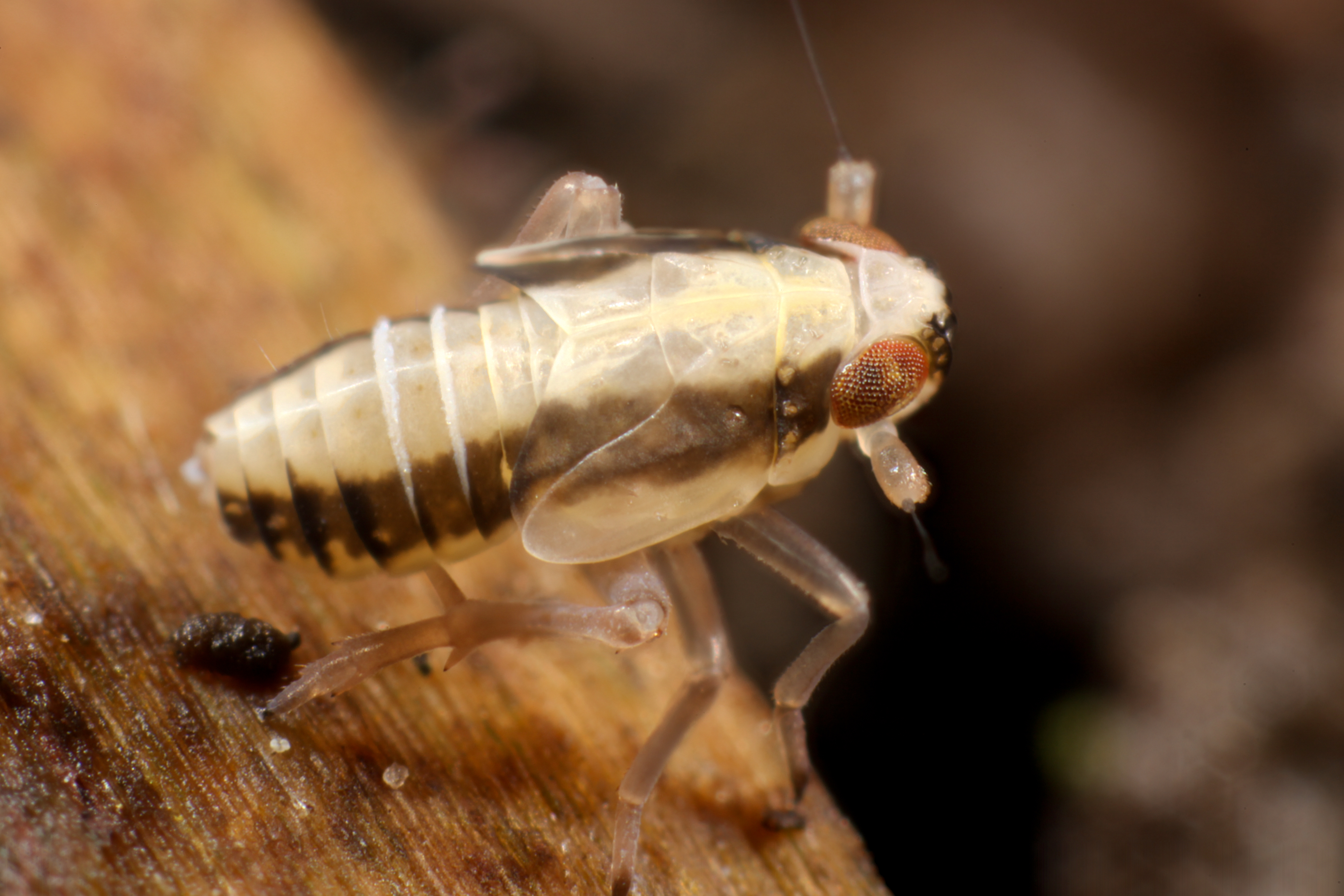

Scientific classification
- Domain: Eukaryota
- Kingdom: Animalia
- Phylum: Arthropoda
- Class: Insecta
- Order: Hemiptera
- Suborder: Auchenorrhyncha
- Infraorder: Fulgoromorpha
- Family: Delphacidae
- Tribe: Delphacini
- Genus: Muellerianella; Wagner, 1963

= Muellerianella =

Genus of true bugs

Muellerianella is a genus of delphacid planthoppers in the family Delphacidae. There are about seven described species in Muellerianella.

== Species ==
These seven species belong to the genus Muellerianella:

- Muellerianella brevipennis (Boheman, 1847)
- Muellerianella extrusa (Scott, 1871)
- Muellerianella fairmairei (Perris, 1857)
- Muellerianella guaduae (Muir, 1926)
- Muellerianella laminalis (Van Duzee, 1897)
- Muellerianella meadi Kennedy, Bartlett & Wilson, 2012
- Muellerianella relicta Logvinenko, 1976
