= Dicranotropis =

Scientific classification
- Domain: Eukaryota
- Kingdom: Animalia
- Phylum: Arthropoda
- Class: Insecta
- Order: Hemiptera
- Suborder: Auchenorrhyncha
- Infraorder: Fulgoromorpha
- Family: Delphacidae
- Genus: Dicranotropis; Fieber, 1866

Genus of true bugs

Dicranotropis is a genus of true bugs belonging to the family Delphacidae.

Species:

- Dicranotropis beckeri
- Dicranotropis hamata
