= Delphacinus =

Scientific classification
- Domain: Eukaryota
- Kingdom: Animalia
- Phylum: Arthropoda
- Class: Insecta
- Order: Hemiptera
- Suborder: Auchenorrhyncha
- Infraorder: Fulgoromorpha
- Family: Delphacidae
- Tribe: Delphacini
- Genus: Delphacinus; Fieber, 1866

Genus of true bugs

Delphacinus is a genus of true bugs belonging to the family Delphacidae.

The species of this genus are found in Europe.

Species:

- Delphacinus delphacinus Boheman, 1850
