= Struebingianella =

Scientific classification
- Domain: Eukaryota
- Kingdom: Animalia
- Phylum: Arthropoda
- Class: Insecta
- Order: Hemiptera
- Suborder: Auchenorrhyncha
- Infraorder: Fulgoromorpha
- Family: Delphacidae
- Genus: Struebingianella; Wagner, 1963

Genus of true bugs

Struebingianella is a genus of true bugs belonging to the family Delphacidae.

Species:

- Struebingianella detecta (Linnavuori, 1953)
- Struebingianella rasnitsyni Anufriev, 1980
