= Xanthodelphax =

Scientific classification
- Domain: Eukaryota
- Kingdom: Animalia
- Phylum: Arthropoda
- Class: Insecta
- Order: Hemiptera
- Suborder: Auchenorrhyncha
- Infraorder: Fulgoromorpha
- Family: Delphacidae
- Tribe: Delphacini
- Genus: Xanthodelphax; Wagner, 1963

Genus of true bugs

Xanthodelphax is a genus of true bugs belonging to the family Delphacidae.

The species of this genus are found in Europe.

Species:

- Xanthodelphax flaveolus (Flor, 1861)
- Xanthodelphax hellas Asche, 1982
- Xanthodelphax optimus Logvinenko, 1972
- Xanthodelphax straminea (Stål, 1858)
- Xanthodelphax xantha Vilbaste, 1965
