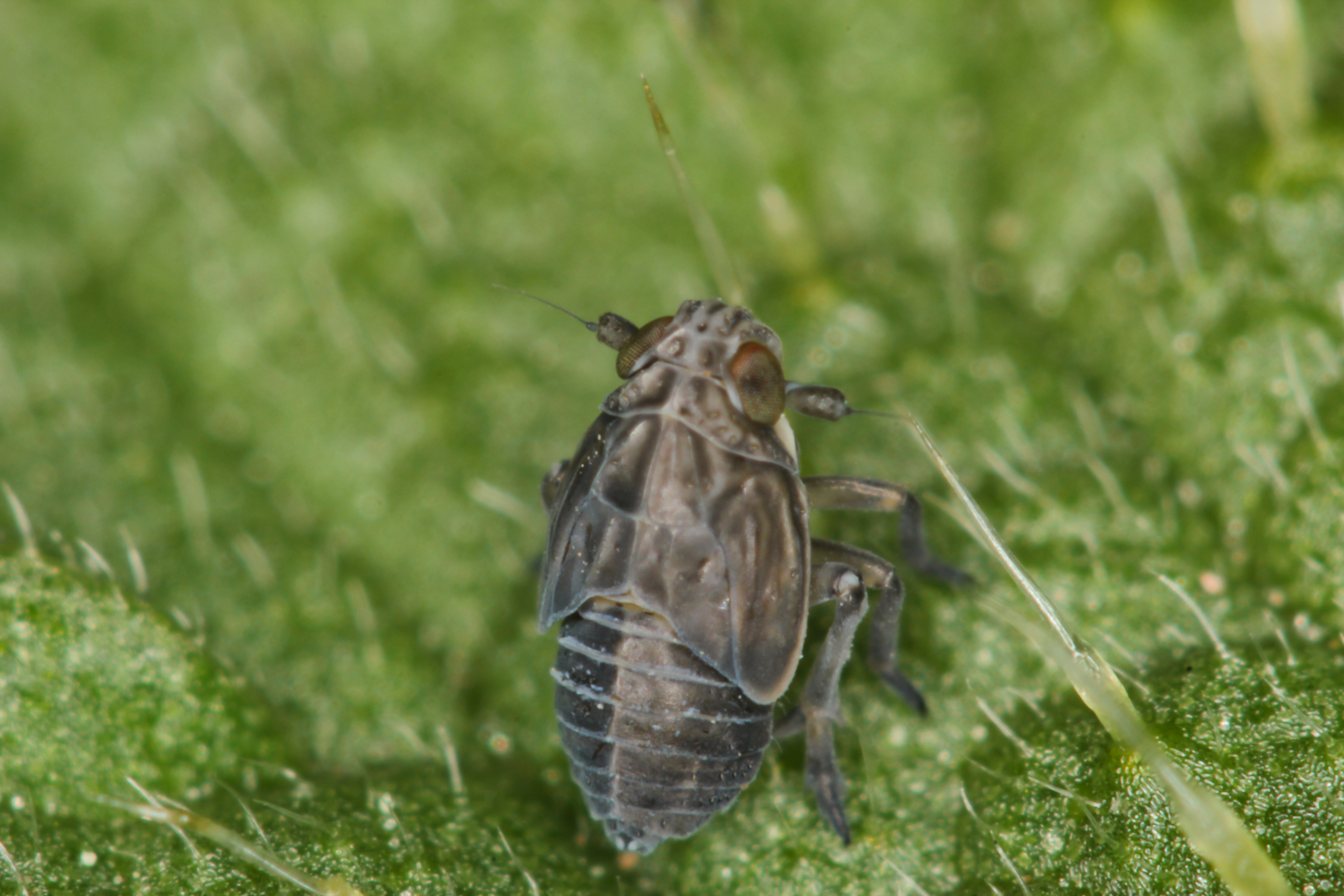

Scientific classification
- Domain: Eukaryota
- Kingdom: Animalia
- Phylum: Arthropoda
- Class: Insecta
- Order: Hemiptera
- Suborder: Auchenorrhyncha
- Infraorder: Fulgoromorpha
- Family: Delphacidae
- Subfamily: Delphacinae
- Genus: Criomorphus; Curtis, 1833

= Criomorphus =

Genus of true bugs

Criomorphus is a genus of delphacid planthoppers in the family Delphacidae. There are about 13 described species in Criomorphus.

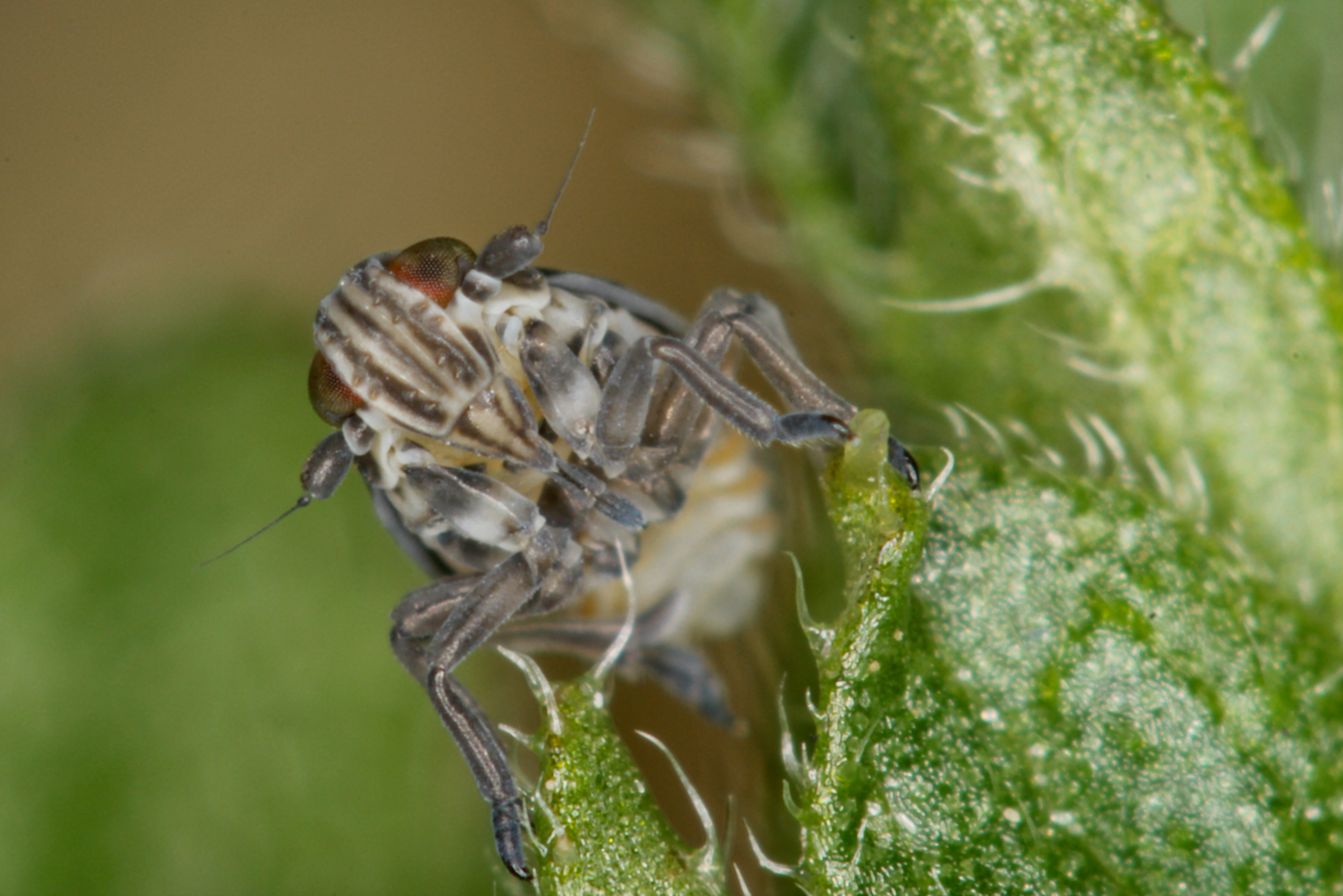

== Species ==
These 13 species belong to the genus Criomorphus:

- Criomorphus agnus Anufriev & Averkin, 1982
- Criomorphus albomarginatus Curtis, 1833
- Criomorphus borealis (Sahlberg, 1871)
- Criomorphus conspicuus Metcalf, 1932
- Criomorphus euagropyri Emeljanov, 1964
- Criomorphus firmatus Emeljanov, 1977
- Criomorphus inconspicuus (Uhler, 1877)
- Criomorphus moestus (Boheman, 1847)
- Criomorphus niger Ding & Zhang, 1994
- Criomorphus nigerrimus Dlabola, 1965
- Criomorphus ovis Anufriev & Averkin, 1982
- Criomorphus wilhelmi Anufriev & Averkin, 1982
- Criomorphus williamsi China, 1939
