= Penepissonotus =

Scientific classification
- Domain: Eukaryota
- Kingdom: Animalia
- Phylum: Arthropoda
- Class: Insecta
- Order: Hemiptera
- Suborder: Auchenorrhyncha
- Infraorder: Fulgoromorpha
- Family: Delphacidae
- Genus: Penepissonotus; Beamer, 1950
- Species: P. bicolor

Binomial name
- Penepissonotus bicolor Beamer, 1950

Genus of true bugs

Penepissonotus is a genus of delphacid planthoppers in the family Delphacidae. There is at least one described species in Penepissonotus, P. bicolor.
