= Plagiotropis (planthopper) =

Scientific classification
- Domain: Eukaryota
- Kingdom: Animalia
- Phylum: Arthropoda
- Class: Insecta
- Order: Hemiptera
- Suborder: Auchenorrhyncha
- Infraorder: Fulgoromorpha
- Family: Delphacidae
- Tribe: Delphacini
- Genus: Plagiotropis; Emeljanov, 1993

Genus of true bugs

Plagiotropis is a genus of planthoppers belonging to the family Delphacidae.

Species:

- Plagiotropis misandros Emeljanov, 1993
