= Gravesteiniella =

Scientific classification
- Kingdom: Animalia
- Phylum: Arthropoda
- Class: Insecta
- Order: Hemiptera
- Suborder: Auchenorrhyncha
- Infraorder: Fulgoromorpha
- Family: Delphacidae
- Genus: Gravesteiniella; Wagner, 1963

Genus of true bugs

Gravesteiniella is a genus of true bugs belonging to the family Delphacidae.

The species of this genus are found in Europe.

Species:

- Gravesteiniella boldi (Scott, 1870)
- Gravesteiniella deminuta Emeljanov, 1972
