= Ribautodelphax =

Scientific classification
- Kingdom: Animalia
- Phylum: Arthropoda
- Class: Insecta
- Order: Hemiptera
- Suborder: Auchenorrhyncha
- Infraorder: Fulgoromorpha
- Family: Delphacidae
- Genus: Ribautodelphax; Wagner, 1963

Genus of true bugs

Ribautodelphax is a genus of true bugs belonging to the family Delphacidae.

The species of this genus are found in Eurasia and Northern America.

Species:

- Ribautodelphax affinis Logvinenko, 1970
- Ribautodelphax albostriata (Fieber, 1866)
