= Unkanodes =

Scientific classification
- Kingdom: Animalia
- Phylum: Arthropoda
- Class: Insecta
- Order: Hemiptera
- Suborder: Auchenorrhyncha
- Infraorder: Fulgoromorpha
- Family: Delphacidae
- Genus: Unkanodes; Fennah, 1956

Genus of true bugs

Unkanodes is a genus of true bugs belonging to the family Delphacidae.

The species of this genus are found in Eurasia.

Species:

- Unkanodes albifascia (Matsumura, 1900)
- Unkanodes excisa (Melichar, 1898)
