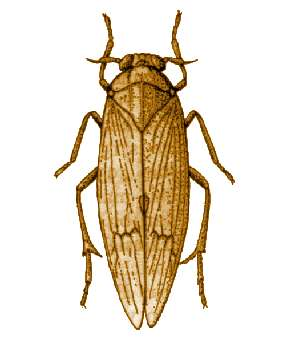
- Nilaparvata lugens

Scientific classification
- Domain: Eukaryota
- Kingdom: Animalia
- Phylum: Arthropoda
- Class: Insecta
- Order: Hemiptera
- Suborder: Auchenorrhyncha
- Infraorder: Fulgoromorpha
- Superfamily: Delphacoidea
- Family: Delphacidae
- Subfamily: Delphacinae
- Tribe: Delphacini
- Genus: Nilaparvata; Distant, 1906

Synonyms
- Kalpa Distant, 1906

= Nilaparvata =

Genus of planthoppers

Nilaparvata is a genus of planthoppers in the subfamily Delphacinae and tribe Delphacini Leach, 1815.

Species are widely distributed in the Americas, Africa, tropical Asia and Australia. The type species, Nilaparvata lugens, also known as the 'brown planthopper', is a major pest of rice crops.

== Species ==
Fulgoromorpha Lists On the Web includes the following:

- Nilaparvata albotristriata (Kirkaldy, 1907)
- Nilaparvata angolensis Synave, 1959
- Nilaparvata bakeri (Muir, 1917)
- Nilaparvata caldwelli Metcalf, 1955
- Nilaparvata camilla Fennah, 1969
- Nilaparvata chaeremon Fennah, 1975
- Nilaparvata diophantu Fennah, 1958
- Nilaparvata gerhardi (Metcalf, 1923)
- Nilaparvata lugens (Stål, 1854) – type species
- Nilaparvata maeander Fennah, 1958
- Nilaparvata muiri China, 1925
- Nilaparvata myersi Muir, 1923
- Nilaparvata nigritarsis Muir, 1926
- Nilaparvata oryzae (Matsumura, 1907)
- Nilaparvata seminula Melichar, 1914
- Nilaparvata serrata Caldwell, 1951
- Nilaparvata terracefrons Guo & Liang, 2005
- Nilaparvata wolcotti Muir & Giffard, 1924
