= Oaristes =

Scientific classification
- Domain: Eukaryota
- Kingdom: Animalia
- Phylum: Arthropoda
- Class: Insecta
- Order: Hemiptera
- Suborder: Auchenorrhyncha
- Infraorder: Fulgoromorpha
- Family: Delphacidae
- Genus: Oaristes; Fennah, 1964

Genus of insects

Oaristes is a genus of planthopper belonging to the family Delphacidae.

Species:

- Oaristes distincta (Muir, 1929)
- Oaristes impicta Linnavuori, 1973
- Oaristes phragmitis Linnavuori, 1973
- Oaristes snelli (Muir, 1929)
