= Laodelphax =

Scientific classification
- Kingdom: Animalia
- Phylum: Arthropoda
- Class: Insecta
- Order: Hemiptera
- Suborder: Auchenorrhyncha
- Infraorder: Fulgoromorpha
- Family: Delphacidae
- Genus: Laodelphax; Fennah, 1963

Genus of true bugs

Laodelphax is a genus of true bugs belonging to the family Delphacidae.

The species of this genus are found in Eurasia.

Species:

- Laodelphax striatellus (Fallén, 1826)
- Laodelphax truncat Surya & Singh, 1980
