= Stiromella =

Scientific classification
- Kingdom: Animalia
- Phylum: Arthropoda
- Class: Insecta
- Order: Hemiptera
- Suborder: Auchenorrhyncha
- Infraorder: Fulgoromorpha
- Family: Delphacidae
- Genus: Stiromella; Wagner, 1963

Genus of true bugs

Stiromella is a genus of true bugs belonging to the family Delphacidae.

The species of this genus are found, for example, in Estonia.

Species:

- Stiromella albeola Mitjaev, 1967
- Stiromella allata Dubovskiy, 1970
