= Nesosydne =

Scientific classification
- Kingdom: Animalia
- Phylum: Arthropoda
- Class: Insecta
- Order: Hemiptera
- Suborder: Auchenorrhyncha
- Infraorder: Fulgoromorpha
- Family: Delphacidae
- Genus: Nesosydne; Kirkaldy, 1907

Genus of true bugs

Nesosydne is a genus of true bugs belonging to the family Delphacidae.

The species of this genus are found in Hawaiian Islands.

Species:

- Nesosydne acastus Fennah, 1958
- Nesosydne agenor Fennah, 1958
