= Stiroma =

Scientific classification
- Domain: Eukaryota
- Kingdom: Animalia
- Phylum: Arthropoda
- Class: Insecta
- Order: Hemiptera
- Suborder: Auchenorrhyncha
- Infraorder: Fulgoromorpha
- Family: Delphacidae
- Genus: Stiroma; Fieber, 1866

Genus of true bugs

Stiroma is a genus of true bugs belonging to the family Delphacidae.

The species of this genus are found in Europe.

Species:

- Stiroma affinis Fieber, 1866
- Stiroma bicarinata (Herrich-Schäffer, 1835)
