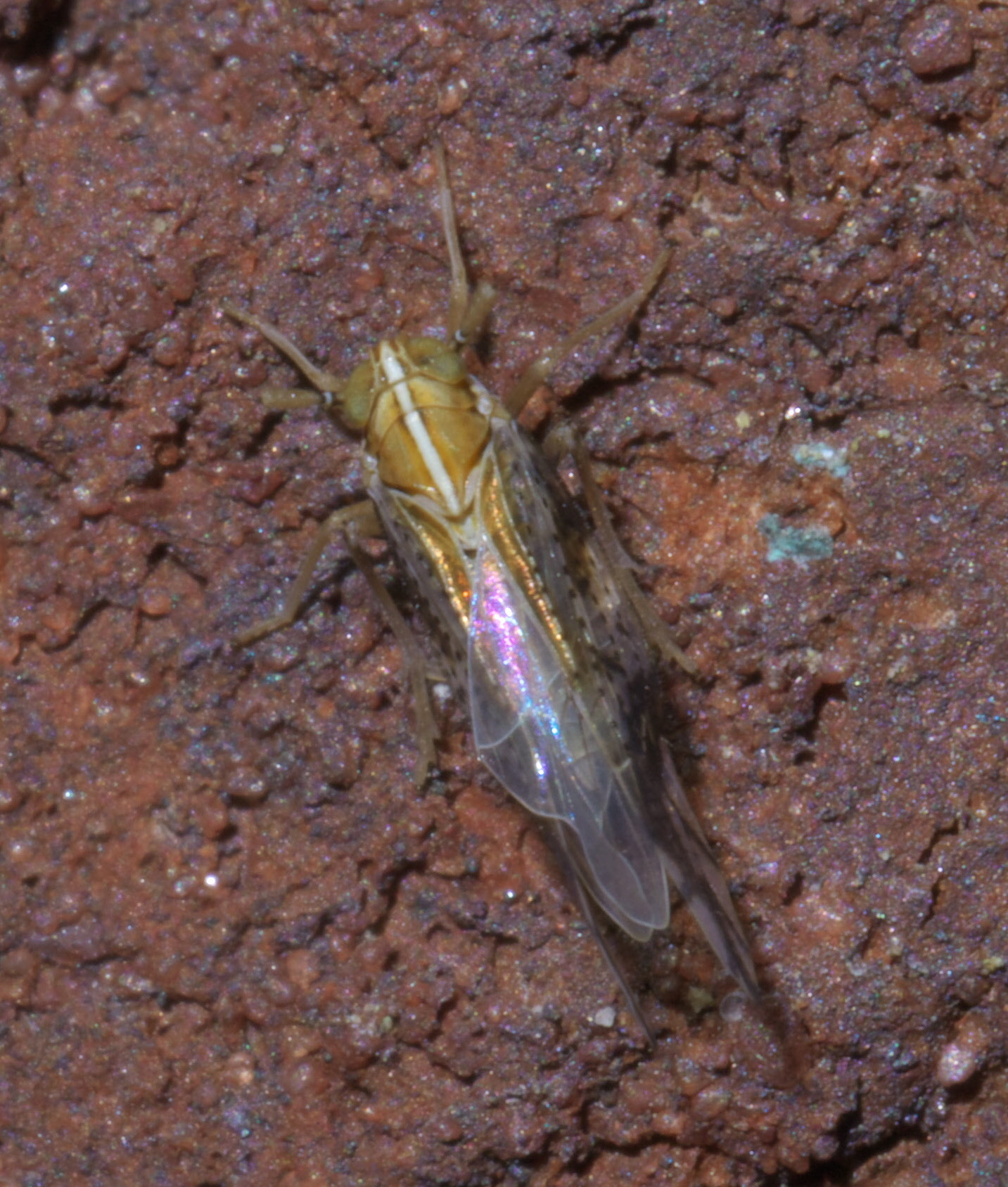

Scientific classification
- Domain: Eukaryota
- Kingdom: Animalia
- Phylum: Arthropoda
- Class: Insecta
- Order: Hemiptera
- Suborder: Auchenorrhyncha
- Infraorder: Fulgoromorpha
- Family: Delphacidae
- Genus: Liburniella; Crawford, 1914
- Species: L. ornata

Binomial name
- Liburniella ornata (Stål, 1862)

= Liburniella =

Genus of true bugs

Liburniella is a genus of delphacid planthoppers in the family Delphacidae. There is at least one described species in Liburniella, L. ornata.

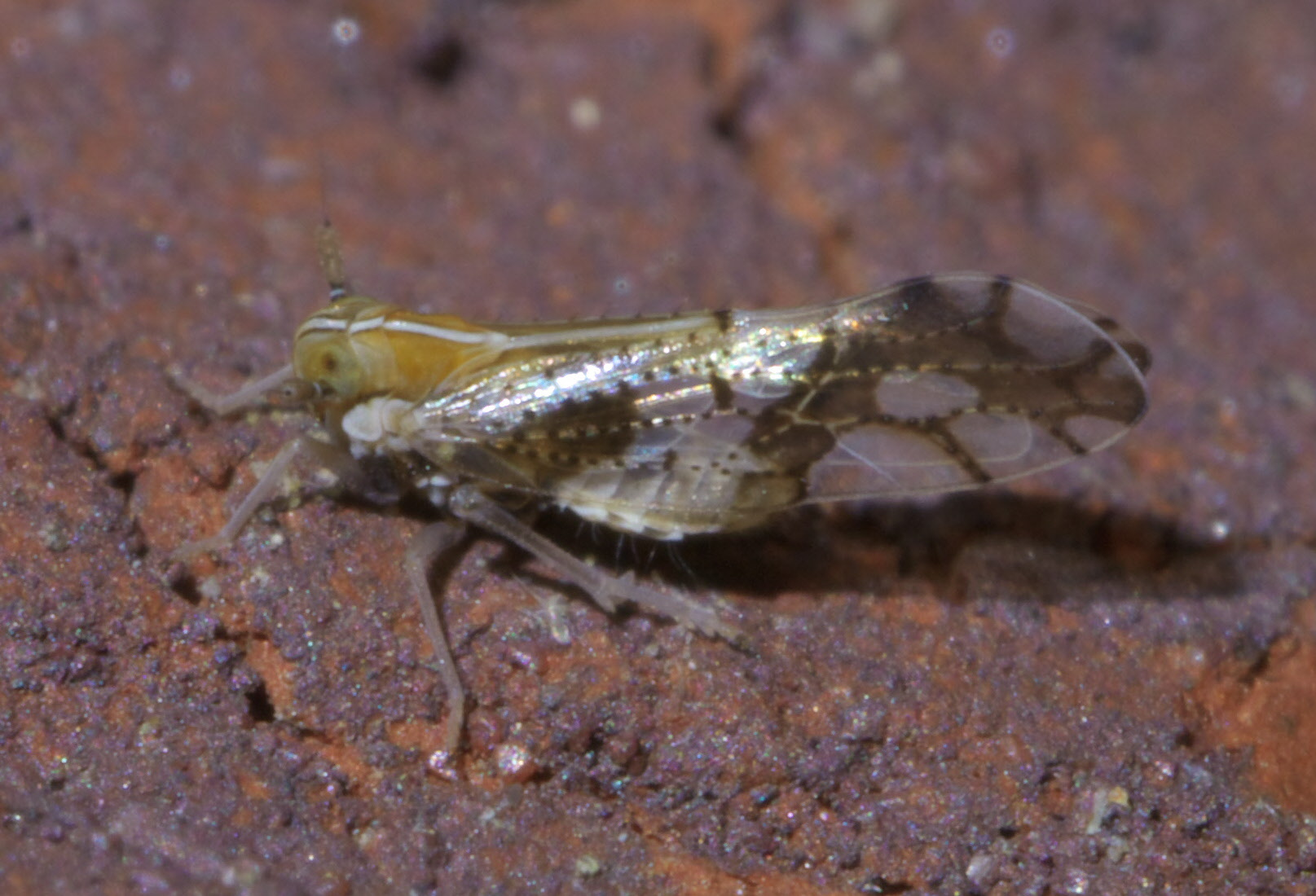
Liburniella ornata
