= Paradelphacodes =

Scientific classification
- Kingdom: Animalia
- Phylum: Arthropoda
- Class: Insecta
- Order: Hemiptera
- Suborder: Auchenorrhyncha
- Infraorder: Fulgoromorpha
- Family: Delphacidae
- Genus: Paradelphacodes; Wagner, 1963

Genus of true bugs

Paradelphacodes is a genus of true bugs belonging to the family Delphacidae.

The species of this genus are found in Europe and Northern America.

Species:

- Paradelphacodes gvosdevi (Mitjaev, 1980)
- Paradelphacodes litoralis (Reuter, 1880)
