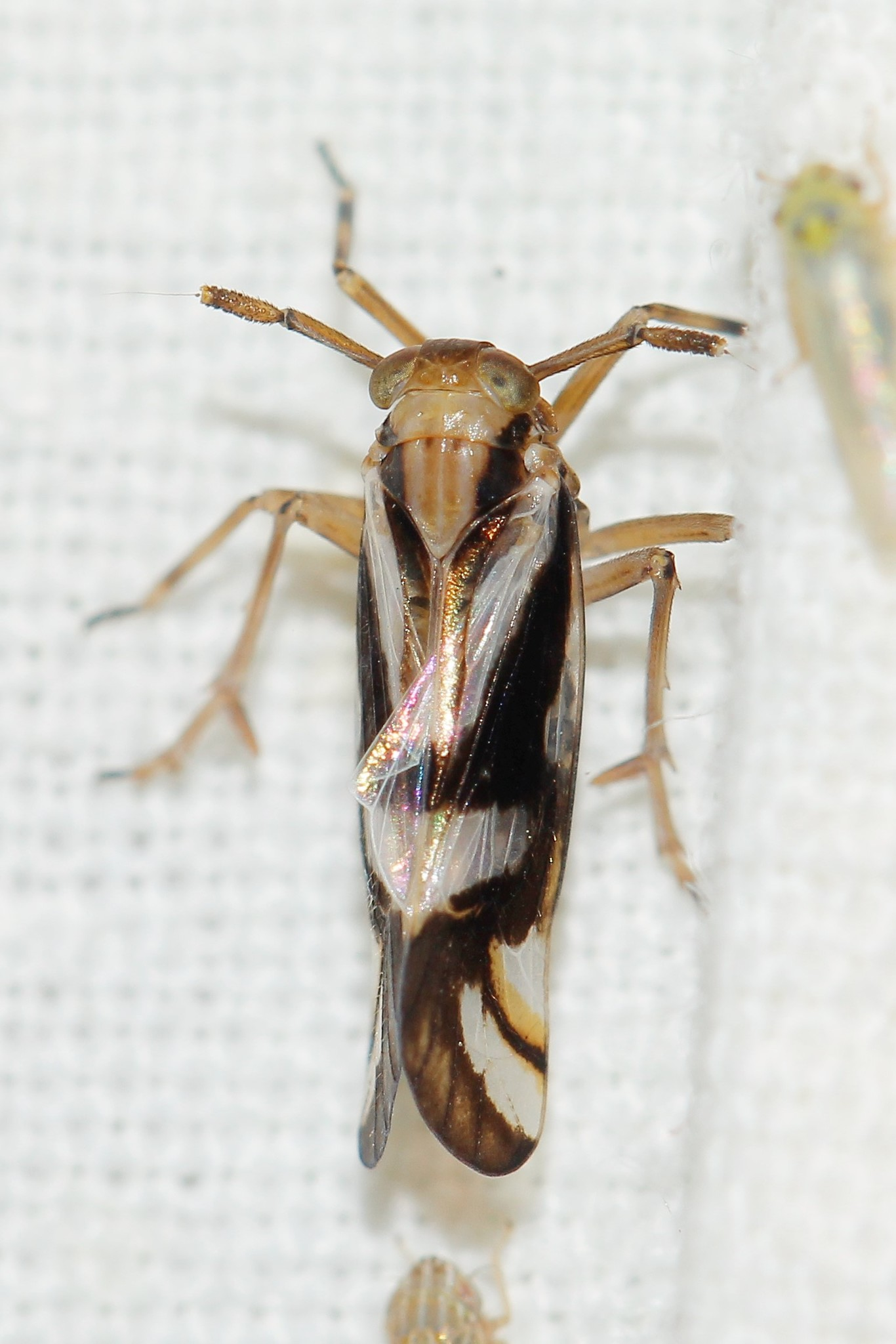
- Delphax crassicornis

Scientific classification
- Kingdom: Animalia
- Phylum: Arthropoda
- Class: Insecta
- Order: Hemiptera
- Suborder: Auchenorrhyncha
- Infraorder: Fulgoromorpha
- Family: Delphacidae
- Tribe: Delphacini
- Genus: Delphax; Fabricius, 1798

Synonyms
- Araeopus Spinola, 1839

= Delphax =

Genus of planthoppers

Delphax is a genus of mostly European planthoppers, typical of the family Delphacidae.

== Species ==
The Global Biodiversity Information Facility lists:

- Delphax alachanicus Anufriev, 1970
- Delphax angulicornis (Latreille, 1807)
- Delphax armeniacus Anufriev, 1970
- Delphax caliginea Stål, 1854
- Delphax conspersinervis Lethierry, 1890
- Delphax crassicornis (Panzer, 1796)
- Delphax dorsatus (Melichar, 1905)
- Delphax gilveola (Kirschbaum, 1868)
- Delphax hemiptera Germar, 1818
- Delphax horvathi (Lallemand, 1925)
- Delphax inermis Ribaut, 1934
- Delphax maritima Anufriev, 1977
- Delphax meridionalis (Haupt, 1924)
- Delphax modesta Fieber, 1866
- Delphax narbonensis (Ribaut, 1934)
- Delphax orientalis (Linnavuori, 1955)
- Delphax pakistanica Mushtaq, 1998-01
- Delphax productus (Walker, 1851)
- Delphax pulchellus (Curtis, 1833)
- Delphax radiata Costa, 1835
- Delphax rhenana Statz, 1950
- Delphax ribautiana Asche & Drosopoulos, 1982
- Delphax senilis Scudder, 1877
- Delphax setosus (Germar, 1830)
- Delphax stigmaticalis Curtis, 1837
- Delphax substituta Walker, 1851
- Delphax tenae (Muir, 1926)
- Delphax veterum Cockerell, 1921
- Delphax vicaria Walker, 1851
