= Aloha (planthopper) =

Scientific classification
- Kingdom: Animalia
- Phylum: Arthropoda
- Clade: Pancrustacea
- Class: Insecta
- Order: Hemiptera
- Suborder: Auchenorrhyncha
- Infraorder: Fulgoromorpha
- Family: Delphacidae
- Tribe: Delphacini
- Genus: Aloha; Kirkaldy, 1904

Type species
- Aloha ipomoeae Kirkaldy, 1904

Genus of planthoppers

Aloha is a genus of planthopper named by George Willis Kirkaldy in 1904. As of 2018, ten species are recognized:

- Aloha artemisiae (Kirkaldy, 1910) — Hawai'ian Islands
- Aloha campylothecae Muir, 1916 — Hawai'ian Islands
- Aloha dubautiae (Kirkaldy, 1910) — Hawai'ian Islands
- Aloha flavocollaris Muir, 1916 — Hawai'ian Islands
- Aloha ipomoeae Kirkaldy, 1904 — Hawai'ian Islands
- Aloha kirkaldyi Muir, 1916 — Hawai'ian Islands
- Aloha lycurgus Fennah, 1958 — Marquesas Islands
- Aloha myoporicola Kirkaldy, 1910 — Hawai'ian Islands
- Aloha plectranthi Muir, 1916 — Hawai'ian Islands
- Aloha swezeyi Muir, 1916 — Hawai'ian Islands
