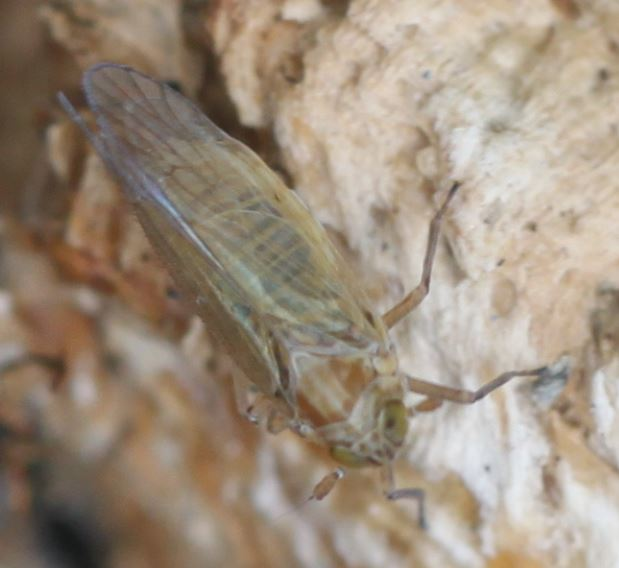
- Metadelphax propinqua

Scientific classification
- Domain: Eukaryota
- Kingdom: Animalia
- Phylum: Arthropoda
- Class: Insecta
- Order: Hemiptera
- Suborder: Auchenorrhyncha
- Infraorder: Fulgoromorpha
- Family: Delphacidae
- Subfamily: Delphacinae; Leach, 1815

= Delphacinae =

Subfamily of planthoppers

Delphacinae is a subfamily of delphacid planthoppers in the family Delphacidae. There are at least 1,700 described species in Delphacinae.

== Tribes ==
The following are included in BioLib.cz:

=== Delphacini ===
Auth. Leach, 1815; Selected genera:

- Aloha Kirkaldy, 1904
- Delphax Fabricius, 1798
- Nilaparvata Distant, 1906
- Perkinsiella Kirkaldy, 1903
- Sogatella Fennah, 1956

=== Saccharosydnini ===
Auth. Vilbaste, 1968

1. Lacertina Remes Lenicov & Rossi Batiz, 2011
2. Lacertinella Rossi Batiz & Remes Lenicov, 2012
3. Neomalaxa Muir, 1918
4. Pseudomacrocorupha Muir, 1930
5. Saccharosydne Kirkaldy, 1907

=== Tropidocephalini ===
Auth. Muir, 1915

1. Arcifrons Ding & Yang, 1986
2. Arcofaciella Fennah, 1956
3. Arcofacies Muir, 1915
4. Bambucibatus Muir, 1915
5. Bambusiphaga Huang & Ding, 1979
6. Belocera Muir, 1913
7. Carinodelphax Ding & Yang, 1987
8. Carinofrons Chen & Li, 2000
9. Columbiana Muir, 1919
10. Columbisoga Muir, 1921
11. Conocraera Muir, 1916
12. Epeurysa Matsumura, 1900
13. Gufacies Ding, 2006
14. Haerinella Fennah, 1965
15. Holzfussella Schmidt, 1926
16. Jassidaeus Fieber, 1866
17. Lamaxa Bartlett & Kennedy, 2018
18. Lanaphora Muir, 1915
19. Lauriana Ren & Qin, 2014
20. Macrocorupha Muir, 1926
21. Malaxa Melichar, 1914
22. Malaxella Ding & Hu, 1986
23. Mirocauda Chen, 2003
24. Mucillnata Qin & Zhang, 2010
25. Neobelocera J.H. Ding & L.F. Yang, 1986
26. Neocarinodelphax Chen & Tsai, 2009
27. Orchesma Melichar, 1903
28. Platyeurysa Fennah, 1988
29. Procidelphax Bartlett, 2010
30. Pseudembolophora Muir, 1920
31. Pundaluoya Kirkaldy, 1903
32. Purohita Distant, 1906
33. Smaroides Fennah, 1988
34. Sogatopsis Muir, 1913
35. Specinervures Kuoh & Ding, 1980
36. Tropidocephala Stål, 1853
37. Xalama Bartlett & Kennedy, 2018
38. Yuanchia Chen & Tsai, 2009

== Further information ==
- List of Delphacinae genera (many in this subfamily)
- Ross H. Arnett (30 July 2000). American Insects: A Handbook of the Insects of America North of Mexico. CRC Press. ISBN 978-0-8493-0212-1.
