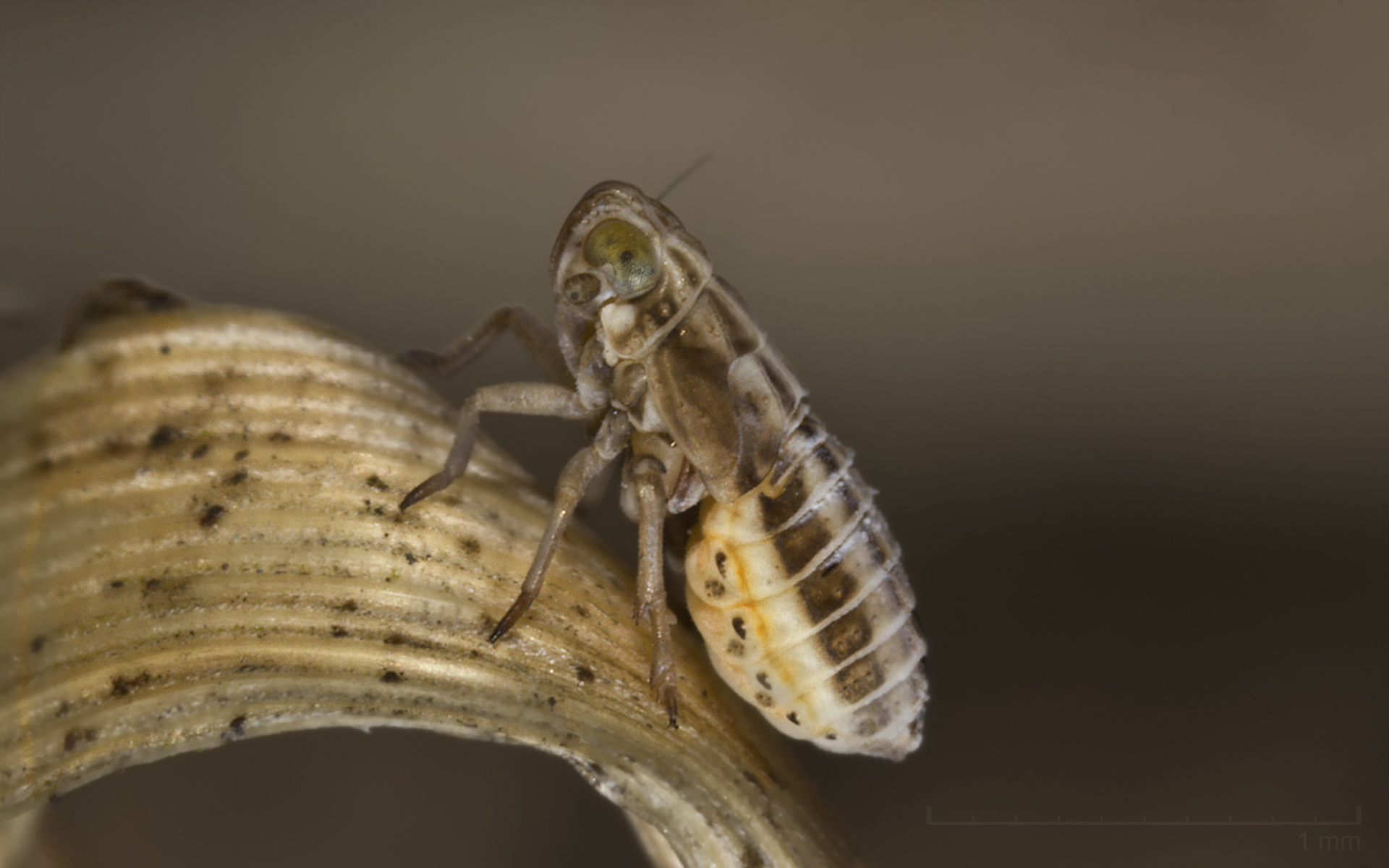
- Delphacidae nymph

Scientific classification
- Domain: Eukaryota
- Kingdom: Animalia
- Phylum: Arthropoda
- Class: Insecta
- Order: Hemiptera
- Suborder: Auchenorrhyncha
- Infraorder: Fulgoromorpha
- Superfamily: Delphacoidea
- Family: Delphacidae; Leach, 1815

Subfamilies
- See text

= Delphacidae =

- Sulix tasmani

Family of planthoppers

Delphacidae is a family of planthoppers containing about 2000 species, distributed worldwide. Delphacids are separated from other "hoppers" by the prominent spur on the tibia of the hindleg.

== Diet and pest species ==
All species are phytophagous, many occurring on various grasses. Some species are significant pests and important vectors for cereal pathogens; for example:

- The rice brown planthopper, Nilaparvata lugens (Stål)
- The white-backed planthopper (rice), Sogatella furcifera (Horváth, 1899)
- The sugarcane planthopper, Perkinsiella saccharicida Kirkaldy, 1903

== Subfamilies, tribes and selected genera ==
Fulgoromorpha Lists On the Web includes the following tribes and genera (complete lists where tribe unassigned):

=== Asiracinae ===
Auth.: Motschulsky, 1863

- Tribe Asiracini Motschulsky, 1863
- Tribe Eodelphacini Emeljanov, 1995
- Tribe Idiosystatini Emeljanov, 1995
- Tribe Neopunanini Emeljanov, 1995
- Tribe Platysystatini Emeljanov, 1995
- Tribe Tetrasteirini Emeljanov, 1995
- Tribe Ugyopini Fennah, 1979

=== Delphacinae ===
Auth.: Leach, 1815 - world-wide, selected genera:

- Tribe Delphacini Leach, 1815
  - Aloha Kirkaldy, 1904
  - Criomorphus Curtis, 1833
  - Delphacinus Fieber, 1866
  - Delphacodes Fieber, 1866 (synonym Delphax Latreille, 1807)
  - Javesella Fennah, 1963
  - Kakuna Matsumura, 1935
  - Megamelus Fieber, 1866
  - Metadelphax Wagner, 1963
  - Muellerianella Wagner, 1963
  - Muirodelphax Wagner, 1963
  - Nilaparvata Distant, 1906
  - Nothodelphax Fennah, 1963
  - Paraliburnia Jensen-Haarup, 1917
  - Prokelisia Osborn, 1905
  - Pseudaraeopus Kirkaldy, 1904 (synonym Delphacodes Melichar, 1901) - southern Europe
    1. Pseudaraeopus dalmatinus Horváth, 1922
    2. Pseudaraeopus lethierryi (Mulsant & Rey, 1879)
    3. Pseudaraeopus sacchari (Muir, 1913)
  - Sogatella Fennah, 1956
  - Toya Distant, 1906
  - Xanthodelphax Wagner, 1963
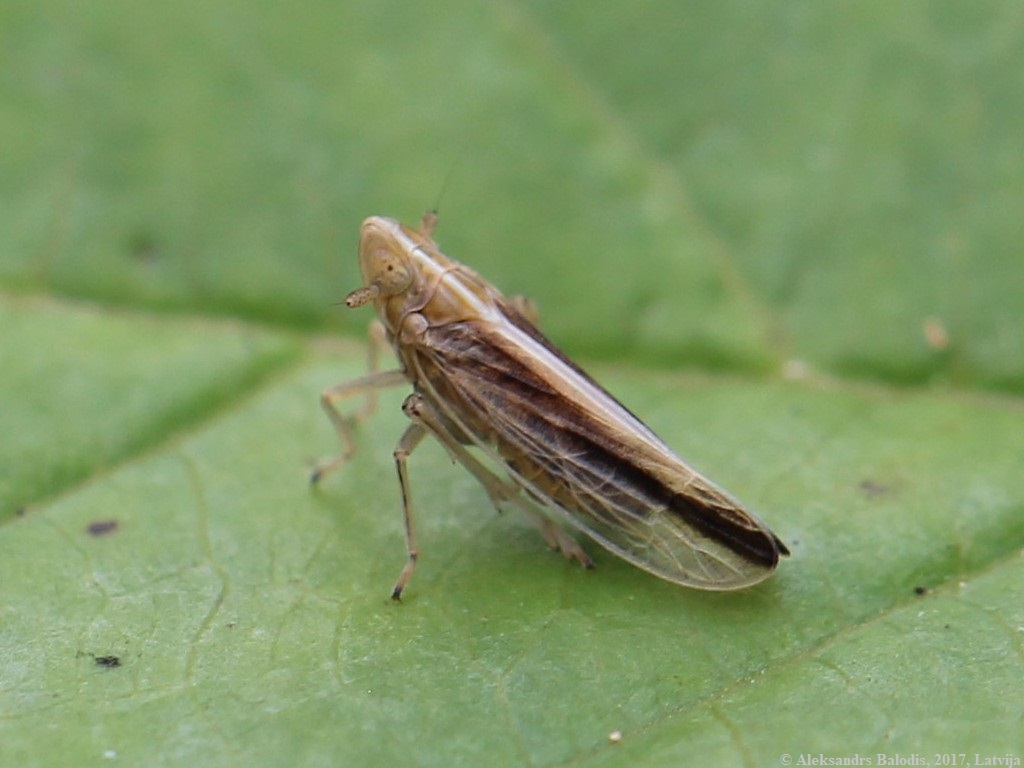
    Stenocranus minutus
- Tribe Saccharosydnini Vilbaste, 1968
  - Lacertinella (Remes Lenicov & Rossi Batiz) 2011
  - Neomalaxa Muir, 1918
  - Pseudomacrocorupha Muir, 1930
  - Saccharosydne Kirkaldy, 1907
- Tribe Tropidocephalini Muir, 1915
  - Tropidocephala Stål, 1853

=== Kelisiinae ===
Auth.: Wagner, 1963

- Anakelisia Wagner, 1963
- Kelisia Fieber, 1866

=== Plesiodelphacinae ===
Auth.: Asche, 1985 - neotropical

- Burnilia Muir & Giffard, 1924
- Plesiodelphax Asche, 1985

=== Stenocraninae ===
Auth.: Wagner, 1963

- Embolophora Stål, 1853
- Frameus Bartlett, 2010
- Kelisicranus Bartlett, 2006
- Obtusicranus Bartlett, 2006
- Preterkelisia Yang, 1989
- Proterosydne Kirkaldy, 1907
- Stenocranus Fieber, 1866 - type genus
- Stenokelisia Ribaut, 1934
- Tanycranus Bartlett, 2010
- Terauchiana Matsumura, 1915

=== Vizcayinae ===
Auth.: Asche, 1990 – SE Asia

- Neovizcaya Liang, 2002
- Vizcaya Muir, 1917 - type genus

=== Subfamily not placed ===
- †Amagua Cockerell, 1924
- Epunka Matsumura, 1935
- Eunycheuma Yang, 1989
- Hikona Matsumura, 1935
- Jugodina Schumacher, 1915
- Lauriana Ren & Qin, 2014
- Megamelodes Le Quesne, 1960
- Nephropsia Costa, 1862
- Sogatodes Fennah, 1963
- Unkana Matsumura, 1935
