= List of Achilidae genera =

This is a list of 161 genera in the family Achilidae, achilid planthoppers.

== Achilidae genera ==
- Abas ^{c g}
- Achilla ^{c g}
- Achilus ^{c g}
- Acixiites ^{c g}
- Acocarinus ^{c g}
- Acus ^{c g}
- Afrachilus ^{c g}
- Agandecca ^{c g}
- Akotropis ^{c g}
- Alticeps ^{c g}
- Amblycratus ^{c g}
- Amphignoma ^{c g}
- Anabunda ^{c g}
- Aneipo ^{c g}
- †Angustachilus ^{c g}
- Apateson ^{c g}
- Aphypia ^{c g}
- Argeleusa ^{c g}
- Aristyllis ^{c g}
- Ballomarius ^{c g}
- Bathycephala ^{c g}
- Benella ^{c g}
- Betatropis ^{c g}
- Booneta ^{c g}
- Brachypyrrhyllis ^{c g}
- Bunduica ^{c g}
- Caffropyrrhyllis ^{c g}
- Calerda ^{c g}
- Callichlamys ^{c g}
- Callinesia ^{c g}
- Caristianus ^{c g}
- Catonia Uhler, 1895^{c g b}
- Catonidia ^{c g}
- Catonoides ^{c g}
- Cenophron ^{c g}
- Cernea ^{c g}
- Chroneba ^{c g}
- Cionoderella ^{c g}
- Cixidia Fieber, 1866^{c g b}
- Clidonisma ^{c g}
- Clusivius ^{c g}
- Cnidus ^{c g}
- Cocottea ^{c g}
- Cythna ^{c g}
- Deferunda ^{c g}
- Dipsiathus ^{c g}
- Elidiptera ^{c g}
- Emeljanocarinus ^{c g}
- Epiona ^{c g}
- Epiptera ^{b}
- Epirama ^{c g}
- Epiusana ^{c g}
- Epiusanella ^{c g}
- Errada ^{c g}
- Errotasa ^{c g}
- Eudeferunda ^{c g}
- Eurynomella ^{c g}
- Eurynomeus ^{c g}
- Faventilla ^{c g}
- Flatachilus ^{c g}
- Francesca ^{c g}
- Ganachilla ^{c g}
- Gongistes ^{c g}
- Gordiacea ^{c g}
- Haicixidia ^{c g}
- Haitiana ^{c g}
- Hamba ^{c g}
- Hebrotasa ^{c g}
- Hemiplectoderes ^{c g}
- Hooleya ^{c g}
- Horcomotes ^{c g}
- Ilva ^{c g}
- Indorupex ^{c g}
- Isodaemon ^{c g}
- Juniperthia O'Brien, 1985^{c g b}
- Kardopocephalus ^{c g}
- Katbergella ^{c g}
- Kawanda ^{c g}
- Kawandella ^{c g}
- Kempiana ^{c g}
- Koloptera ^{c g}
- Kosalya ^{c g}
- Kurandella ^{c g}
- Lanuvia ^{c g}
- Leptarciella ^{c g}
- Mabira ^{c g}
- Magadha ^{c g}
- Magadhaideus ^{c}
- Mahuna ^{c g}
- Martorella ^{c g}
- Maurisca ^{c g}
- Messeis ^{c g}
- Metaphradmon ^{c g}
- Mlanjella ^{c g}
- Momar Fennah, 1950^{c g b}
- Moraballia ^{c g}
- Mycarinus ^{c g}
- Mycarus ^{c g}
- Myconellus ^{c g}
- Myconus ^{c g}
- Myrophenges ^{c g}
- Nelidia ^{c g}
- Nephelesia ^{c g}
- Nephelia ^{c g}
- Niryasaburnia ^{c g}
- Nyonga ^{c g}
- Olmiana ^{c g}
- Opsiplanon Fennah, 1945^{c g b}
- Ouwea ^{c g}
- Parabunda ^{c g}
- Paracatonia ^{c g}
- Paracatonidia ^{c g}
- Paraclusivius ^{c g}
- Paragandecca ^{c g}
- Parakosalya ^{c g}
- Paraphradmon ^{c g}
- Paraphypia ^{c g}
- Parargeleusa ^{c g}
- Parasabecoides ^{c g}
- Paratangia ^{c g}
- Paratesum ^{c g}
- Parelidiptera ^{c g}
- Phenelia ^{c g}
- Phradmonicus ^{c g}
- Phypia ^{c g}
- Plectoderes ^{c g}
- Plectoderoides ^{c g}
- Plectoringa ^{c g}
- Prinoessa ^{c g}
- Prosagandecca ^{c g}
- Protepiptera ^{c g}
- Protomenocria ^{c g}
- Pseudhelicoptera ^{c g}
- Psycheona ^{c g}
- Pyrrhyllis ^{c g}
- Quadrana ^{c g}
- Remosachilus ^{c g}
- Rhinochloris ^{c g}
- Rhinocolura ^{c g}
- Rhotala ^{c g}
- Rhotaloides ^{c g}
- Ridesa ^{c g}
- Rupex ^{c g}
- Sabecoides ^{c g}
- Salemina ^{c g}
- Semibetatropis ^{c g}
- Sevia ^{c g}
- Spino ^{c g}
- Symplegadella ^{c g}
- Synecdoche O'Brien, 1971^{c g b}
- Taloka ^{c g}
- Tangina ^{c g}
- Taractellus ^{c g}
- Thectoceps ^{c g}
- Tropiphlepsia ^{c g}
- Uniptera ^{c g}
- Usana ^{c g}
- Waghilde ^{c g}
- Williamsus ^{c g}
- Xerbus ^{c g}
- Zathauma ^{c g}

Data sources: i = ITIS, c = Catalogue of Life, g = GBIF, b = Bugguide.net
