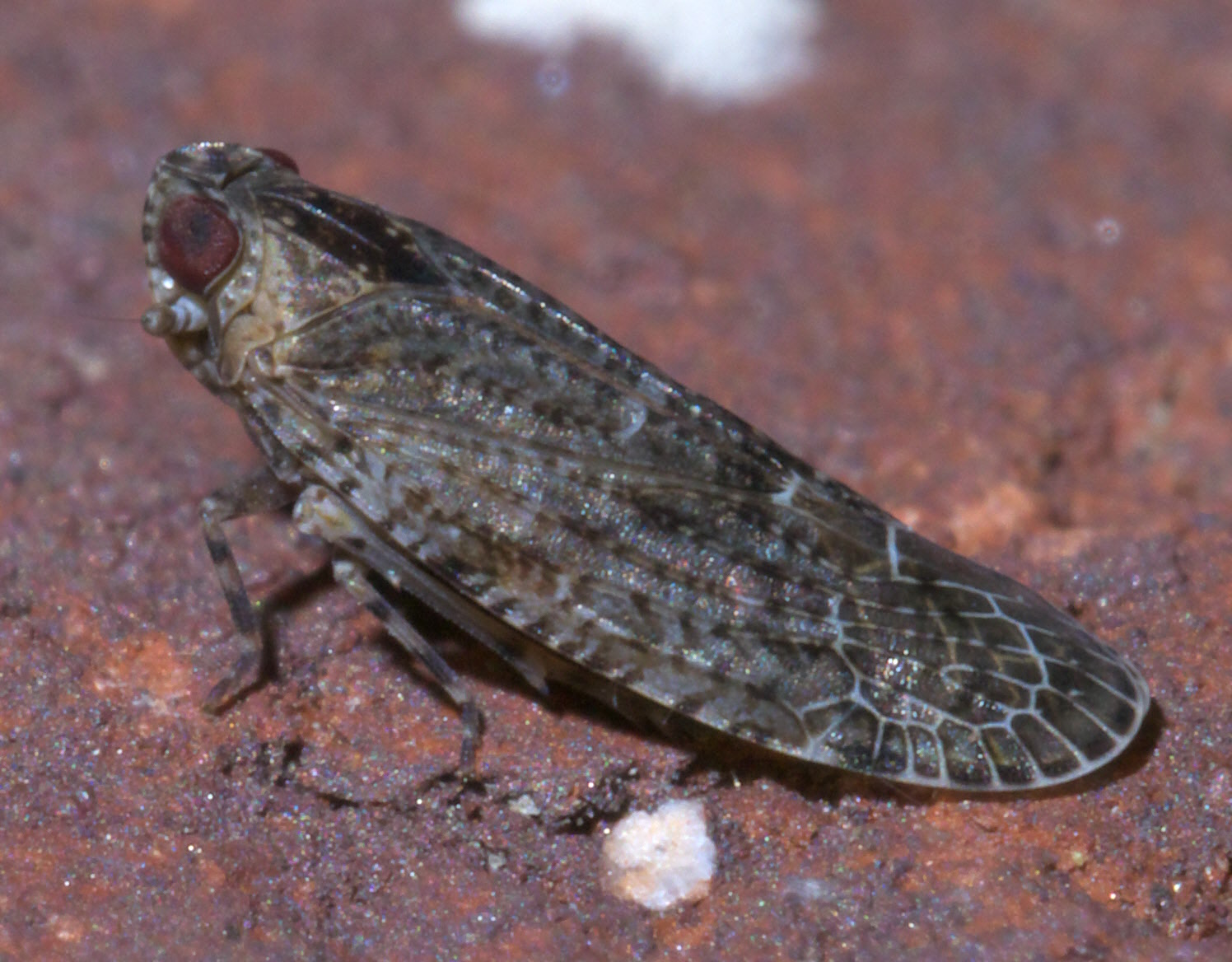
- Catonia sp.

Scientific classification
- Kingdom: Animalia
- Phylum: Arthropoda
- Class: Insecta
- Order: Hemiptera
- Suborder: Auchenorrhyncha
- Infraorder: Fulgoromorpha
- Family: Achilidae
- Subfamily: Myconinae
- Tribe: Plectoderini; Fennah, 1950

= Plectoderini =

Tribe of planthoppers

The Plectoderini are a large tribe of planthoppers in the family Achilidae, erected by Ronald Gordon Fennah in 1950. Genera have a world-wide distribution, but are hardly represented in Europe or northern Asia.

== Genera ==
Fulgoromorpha Lists on the Web (FLOW) lists:

1. Abas Fennah, 1950
2. Afrachilus Fennah, 1965
3. Agandecca Buchanan White, 1879
4. Akotropis Matsumura, 1914
5. Amblycratus Uhler, 1895
6. Aphypia Melichar, 1908
7. Argeleusa Kirkaldy, 1906
8. Aristyllis Kirkaldy, 1906
9. Ballomarius Jacobi, 1941
10. Bathycephala Fennah, 1950
11. Benella Kirkaldy, 1906
12. Betatropis Matsumura, 1914
13. Brachypyrrhyllis Fennah, 1967
14. Caffropyrrhyllis Fennah, 1950
15. Calerda Signoret, 1864
16. Callichlamys Kirkaldy, 1907
17. Callinesia Kirkaldy, 1907
18. Caristianus Distant, 1916
19. Catonia Uhler, 1895
20. Catonoides Metcalf, 1938
21. Cenophron Fennah, 1969
22. Cernea Williams, 1977
23. Chroneba Stål, 1859
24. Cionoderella Fennah, 1950
25. Clidonisma Fennah, 1969
26. Clusivius Distant, 1917
27. Cnidus Stål, 1866 (synonym Necho Jacobi, 1910)
28. Cocottea Williams, 1977
29. Cythna Kirkaldy, 1906
30. Deferunda Distant, 1912
31. Epirama Melichar, 1903
32. Epiusana Fennah, 1950
33. Epiusanella Synave, 1959
34. Eudeferunda Chen, Yang & Wilson, 1989
35. Eurynomella Fennah, 1967
36. Eurynomeus Kirkaldy, 1906
37. Francesca Kirkaldy, 1906
38. Gongistes Fennah, 1969
39. Gordiacea Metcalf, 1948
40. Haitiana Dozier, 1936
41. Hamba Distant, 1907
42. Hemiplectoderes Fennah, 1950
43. Horcomotes Fennah, 1969
44. Indorupex Fennah, 1965
45. Isodaemon Fennah, 1969
46. Juniperthia O'Brien, 1985
47. Kardopocephalus Metcalf, 1938
48. Kawanda Fennah, 1950
49. Kawandella Synave, 1959
50. Kempiana Muir, 1922
51. Koloptera Metcalf, 1938
52. Kosalya Distant, 1906
53. Kurandella Fennah, 1950 (Kurandella Evans, 1966 doubtful)
54. Lanuvia Stål, 1866
55. Magadha Distant, 1906
56. Magadhaideus Long & Chen, 2017
57. Mahuna Distant, 1907
58. Martorella Caldwell, 1951
59. Metalticeps Dmitriev, 2020
60. Mlanjella Fennah, 1950
61. Momar Fennah, 1950
62. Moraballia Fennah, 1950
63. Neoacus Dmitriev, 2020
64. Nephelesia Fennah, 1965
65. Nephelia Kirkaldy, 1907
66. Nyonga Synave, 1959
67. Opsiplanon Fennah, 1945
68. Paracatonia Fennah, 1950
69. Paraclusivius Fennah, 1950
70. Paragandecca Fennah, 1950
71. Parakosalya Distant, 1917
72. Paraphypia Synave, 1960
73. Parargeleusa Fennah, 1950
74. Paratangia Melichar, 1903
75. Phenelia Kirkaldy, 1906
76. Phypia Stål, 1860
77. Plectoderes Spinola, 1839
78. Plectoderoides Matsumura, 1914
79. Plectoringa Fennah, 1950
80. Prosagandecca Fennah, 1950
81. Pseudhelicoptera Fowler, 1904
82. Pyrrhyllis Kirkaldy, 1906
83. Quadrana Caldwell, 1951
84. Remosachilus Fennah, 1950
85. Rhinocolura Fennah, 1950
86. Rhotaloides Fennah, 1965
87. Rupex Fennah, 1950
88. Salemina Kirkaldy, 1906
89. Semibetatropis Chun Liang Chen, Chung Tu Yang & Wilson, 1989
90. Spino Fennah, 1950
91. Symplegadella Fennah, 1950
92. Synecdoche O'Brien, 1971
93. Taloka Distant, 1907
94. Tangina Melichar, 1903
95. Thectoceps Williams, 1977
96. Usana Distant, 1906
97. Williamsus Özdikmen & Demir, 2007
98. Xerbus O'Brien, 1971
99. Zathauma Fennah, 1949
