= Acus =

Acus may refer to:

- Syngnathus, a genus of fish
- ACUS, the Administrative Conference of the United States
- Acus (planthopper), a genus of achilids
- Acoma Pueblo, a location and tribe in New Mexico

== See also ==
- ACU (disambiguation)
