= Momar =

Momar is an Arabic male given name, or a variant of Muammer. It may refer to:

- Momar Bangoura (born 1994), Senegalese footballer
- Momar N'Dao (born 1949), Senegalese sprinter
- Momar N'Diaye (born 1987), Senegalese professional footballer
- Momar Ndoye (born 1992), Senegalese professional footballer
- Momar Ndoye (basketball) (born 1995), Senegalese basketball player
- Momar Njie (born 1975), Gambian footballer
- Momar Ori (born 1989), Indian cricketer
- It is also the name of genus Momar (planthopper) in the Achilidae

== See also ==
- Muammer
