= Catonia =

Catonia may refer to:

- Catonia (planthopper), a genus of planthoppers in the family Achilidae
- Catonia, a genus of plants in the family Melastomataceae, synonym of Miconia
- Catonia, a genus of plants in the family Symplocaceae, synonym of Symplocos
