= Nyonga =

Nyonga may refer to:

- Nyonga (planthopper), a genus of planthoppers in the family Achilidae
- Nyonga, Congo, a town in Congo DR

== See also ==
- Bali Nyonga, a town in Cameroon
- Can also refer to other terms in Swahili like tying your tie or informally to masturbator or even the actual of choking someone or something.
