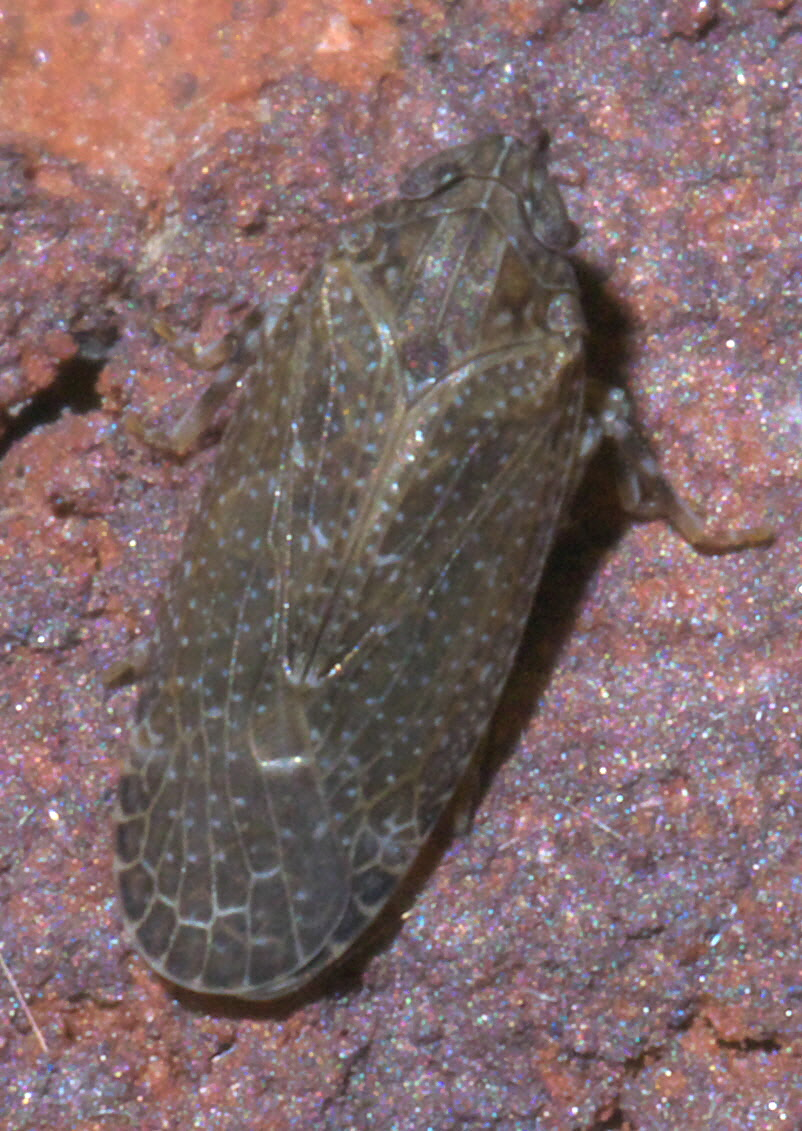

Scientific classification
- Domain: Eukaryota
- Kingdom: Animalia
- Phylum: Arthropoda
- Class: Insecta
- Order: Hemiptera
- Suborder: Auchenorrhyncha
- Infraorder: Fulgoromorpha
- Family: Achilidae
- Genus: Opsiplanon
- Species: O. luellus

Binomial name
- Opsiplanon luellus (Metcalf, 1923)

= Opsiplanon luellus =

Species of true bug

Opsiplanon luellus is a species of achilid planthopper in the family Achilidae. The species is also referred to as Opsiplanon luella.

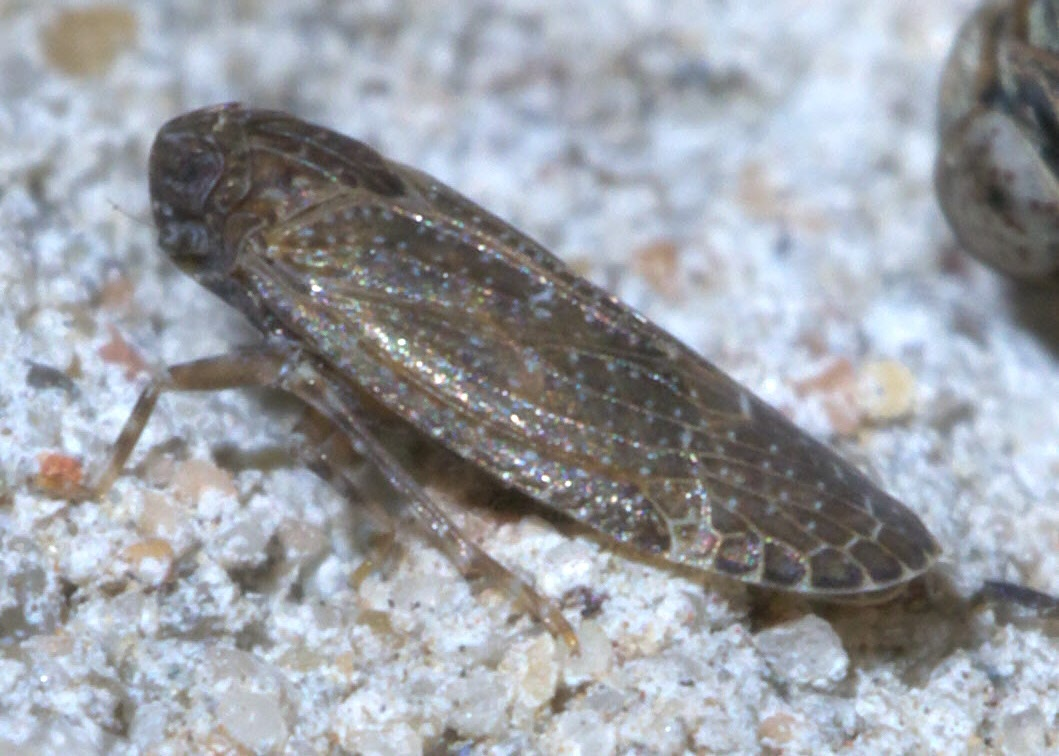
