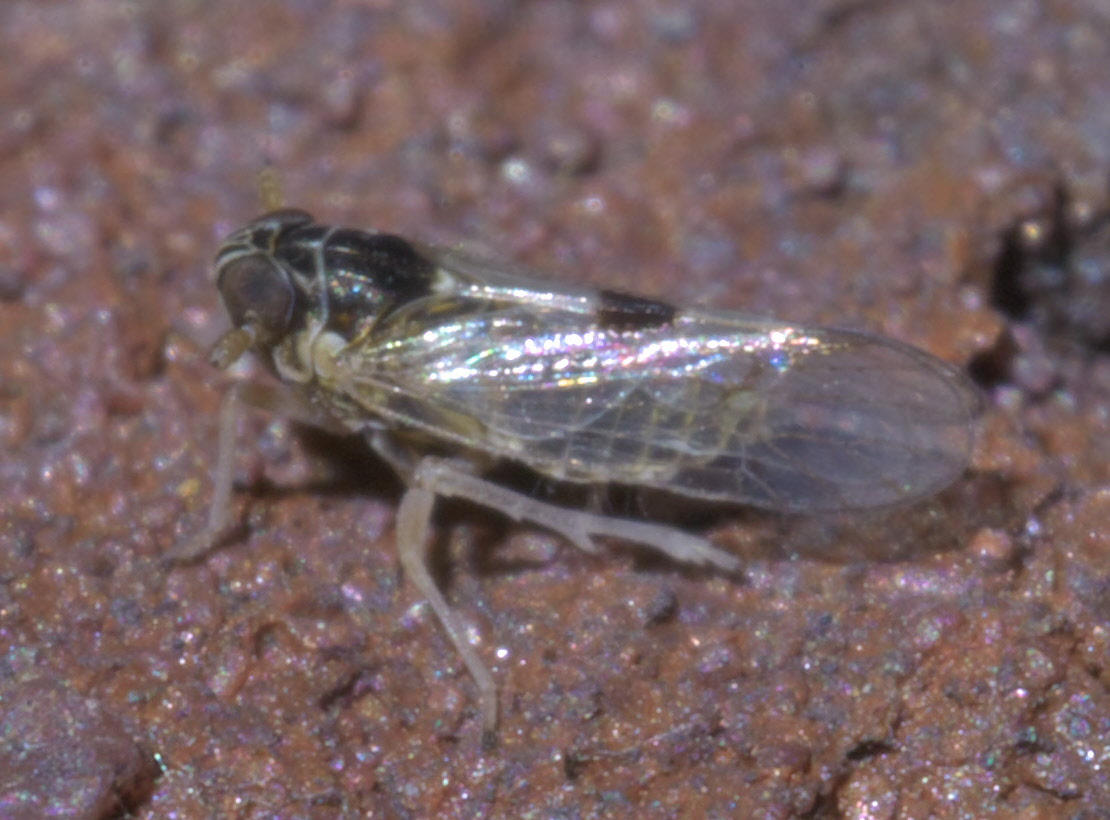
- Nothodelphax consimilis

Scientific classification
- Domain: Eukaryota
- Kingdom: Animalia
- Phylum: Arthropoda
- Class: Insecta
- Order: Hemiptera
- Suborder: Auchenorrhyncha
- Infraorder: Fulgoromorpha
- Family: Delphacidae
- Tribe: Delphacini
- Genus: Nothodelphax; Fennah, 1963

= Nothodelphax =

Genus of true bugs

Nothodelphax is a genus of delphacid planthoppers in the family Delphacidae. There are more than 20 described species in Nothodelphax.

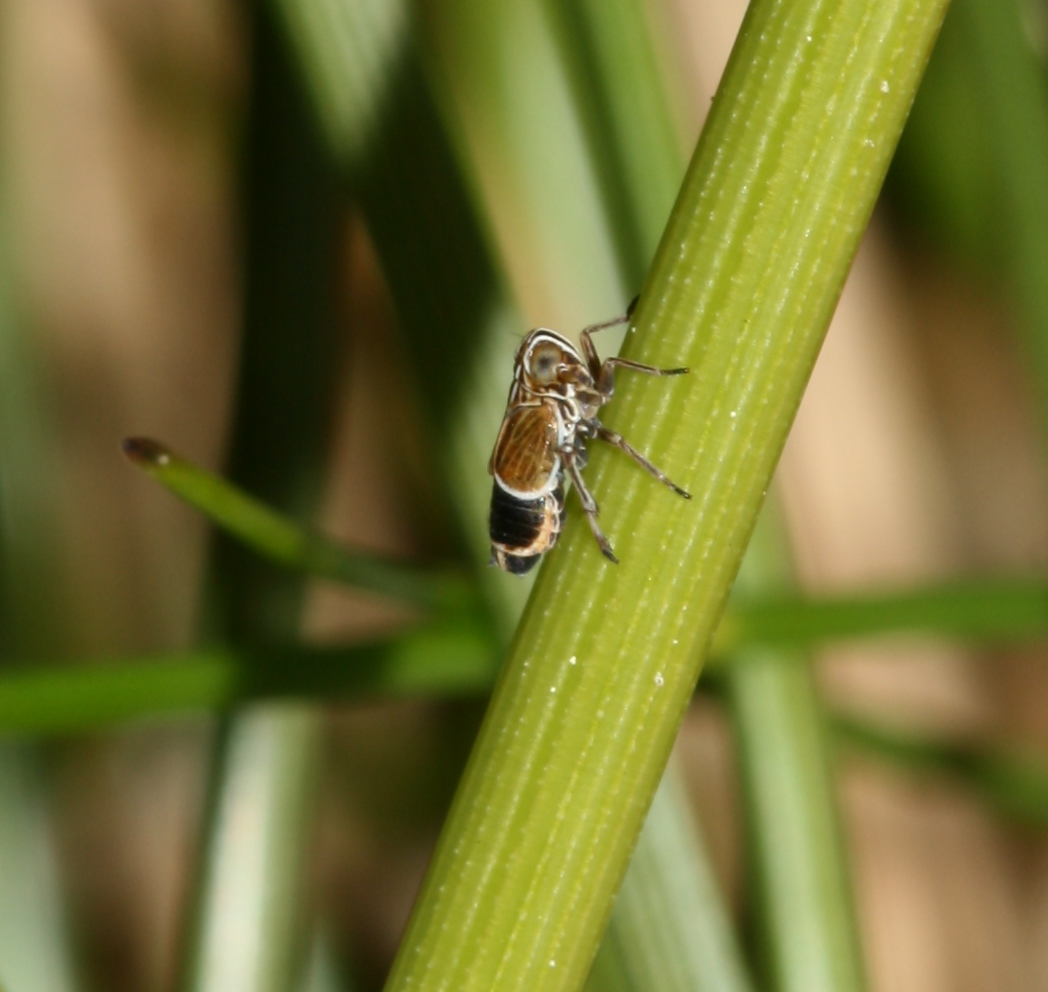
Nothodelphax distinctus

== Species ==
These 21 species belong to the genus Nothodelphax:

- Nothodelphax albocarinata (Stal, 1858)
- Nothodelphax albocarinatus (Stål, 1858)
- Nothodelphax atlanticus (China, 1958)
- Nothodelphax consimilis (Van Duzee, 1897)
- Nothodelphax distincta (Flor, 1861)
- Nothodelphax distinctus (Flor, 1861)
- Nothodelphax eburneocarinata (Anufriev, 1979)
- Nothodelphax eburneocarinatus (Anufriev, 1979)
- Nothodelphax foveata (Van Duzee, 1897)
- Nothodelphax gillettei (Van Duzee, 1897)
- Nothodelphax glacia Wilson, 1992
- Nothodelphax guentheri (Dlabola, 1966)
- Nothodelphax latifrons Emeljanov, 1982
- Nothodelphax lineatipes (Van Duzee, 1897)
- Nothodelphax neocclusa (Muir & Giffard, 1924)
- Nothodelphax occlusa (Van Duzee, 1897)
- Nothodelphax serrata (Beamer, 1948)
- Nothodelphax slossonae (Ball, 1903)
- Nothodelphax tshaunica (Anufriev, 1979)
- Nothodelphax umbrata Emeljanov, 1982
- Nothodelphax venusta (Beamer, 1948)
