= Synecdoche (disambiguation) =

Synecdoche is a linguistic term.

Synecdoche may also refer to:

- Synecdoche (planthopper), a genus of planthoppers
- "Synechdoche" (Person of Interest), an episode of the American television series Person of Interest
- Synecdoche, New York, a 2008 American film
