= Hooleya =

Hooleya can refer to:

- Hooleya (plant), an extinct genus in the family Juglandaceae
- Hooleya (planthopper), a genus of Achilid planthoppers
