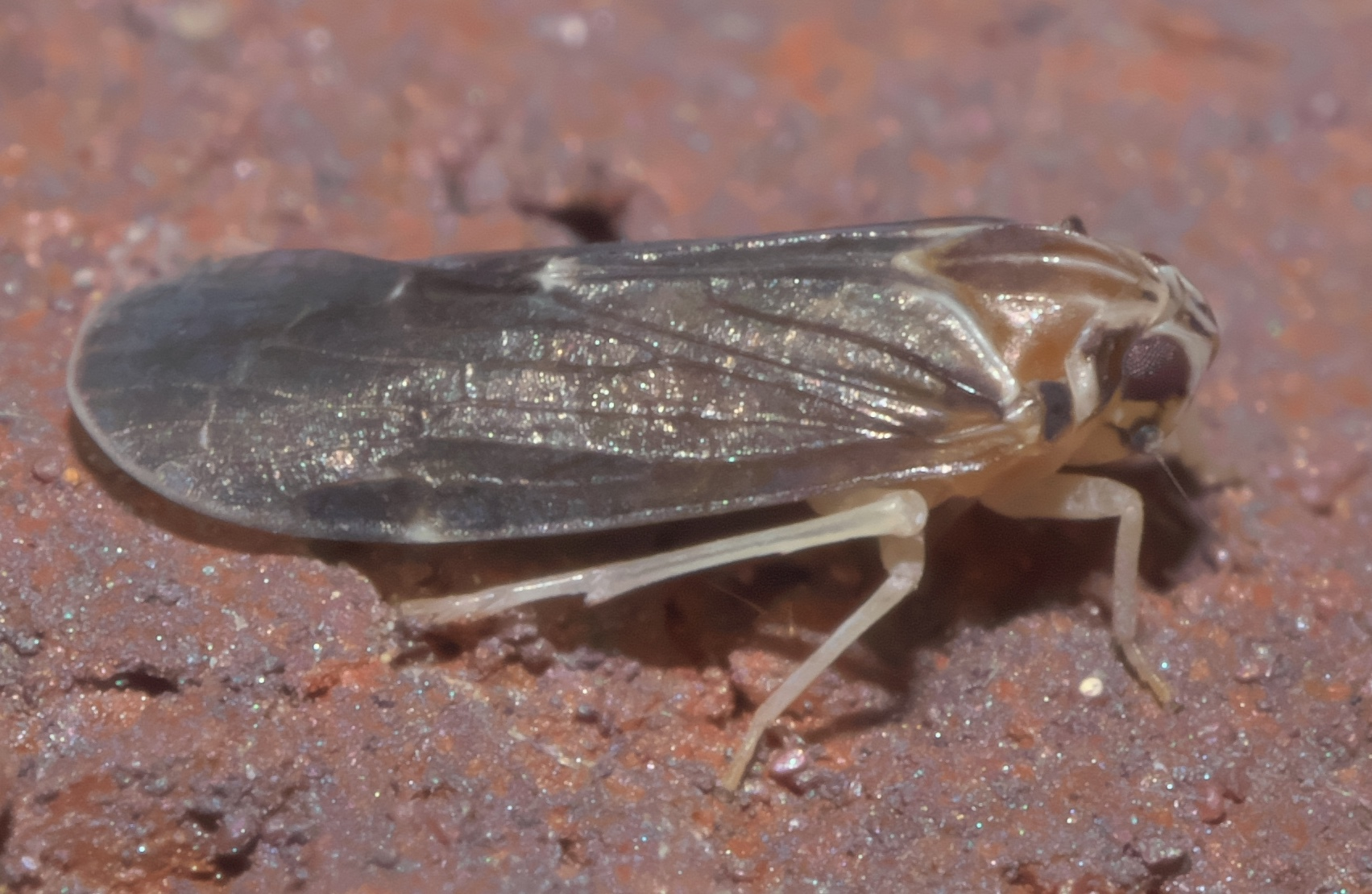

Scientific classification
- Domain: Eukaryota
- Kingdom: Animalia
- Phylum: Arthropoda
- Class: Insecta
- Order: Hemiptera
- Suborder: Auchenorrhyncha
- Infraorder: Fulgoromorpha
- Family: Achilidae
- Genus: Synecdoche
- Species: S. impunctata

Binomial name
- Synecdoche impunctata (Fitch, 1851)

= Synecdoche impunctata =

Species of true bug

Synecdoche impunctata is a species of achilid planthopper in the family Achilidae.
