= Callichlamys =

Callichlamys may refer to:

- Callichlamys (planthopper), a genus of insects in the family Achilidae
- Callichlamys (plant), a genus of plants in the family Bignoniaceae
