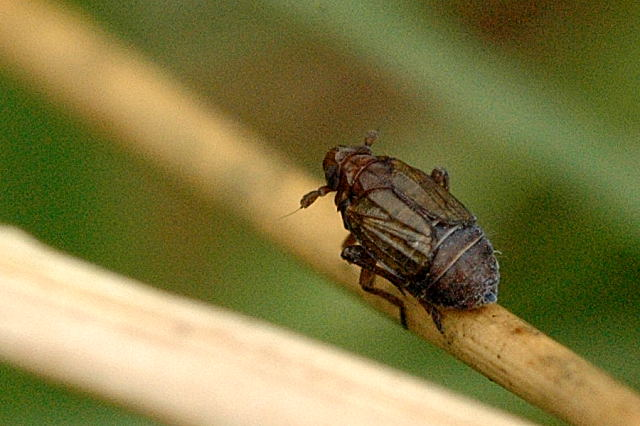
- Female Javesella pellucida

Scientific classification
- Kingdom: Animalia
- Phylum: Arthropoda
- Class: Insecta
- Order: Hemiptera
- Suborder: Auchenorrhyncha
- Infraorder: Fulgoromorpha
- Family: Delphacidae
- Tribe: Delphacini
- Genus: Javesella; Fennah, 1963

= Javesella =

Genus of true bugs

Javesella is a genus of delphacid planthoppers in the family Delphacidae. There are at least 20 described species in Javesella.

== Species ==
These 24 species belong to the genus Javesella.

- Javesella alpina (Sahlberg, 1871)
- Javesella arcanastyla (Beamer, 1948)
- Javesella atrata (Osborn, 1938)
- Javesella azorica Remane, 1975
- Javesella badia Anufriev, 1988
- Javesella beringiaca Emeljanov, 1992
- Javesella bottnica Hulden, 1974
- Javesella compacta Mitjaev, 1988
- Javesella discolor (Boheman, 1847)
- Javesella dolera (Spooner, 1912)
- Javesella dubia (Kirschbaum, 1868)
- Javesella forcipata (Boheman, 1847)
- Javesella ila Wilson, 1992
- Javesella incerta (Van Duzee, 1897)
- Javesella lla Wilson, 1992
- Javesella lutulentella (Muir and Giffard, 1924)
- Javesella nuchtica Dlabola, 1967
- Javesella obscurella (Boheman, 1847)
- Javesella opaca (Beamer, 1948)
- Javesella pellucida (Fabricius, 1794)
- Javesella salina (Haupt, 1924)
- Javesella selengica Dlabola, 1970
- Javesella simillima (Linnavuori, 1948)
- Javesella stali (Metcalf, 1943)
