= Acus (planthopper) =

Scientific classification
- Kingdom: Animalia
- Phylum: Arthropoda
- Clade: Pancrustacea
- Class: Insecta
- Order: Hemiptera
- Suborder: Auchenorrhyncha
- Infraorder: Fulgoromorpha
- Family: Achilidae
- Genus: Acus

Genus of true bugs

Acus is a genus of achilid planthoppers in the family Achilidae. There is at least one described species in Acus, A. acutulus. Since the name Acus Gray, 1847 had already been used for a genus of sea snails, it was proposed in 2020 to rename the planthopper genus as Neoacus.

== See also ==
- List of Achilidae genera
