= Muammer =

Muammer (also spelled in similar ways such as Ma'mar, Arabic: معمر) is a masculine given name of Arabic origin meaning "long-lived". People with the name include:

== Ma'mar ==
- Ma'mar ibn Rashid, eighth-century hadith scholar
- Ma’mar ibn ul-Muthanna, early Muslim scholar of Arabic philology
- Jamil ibn Ma'mar, classical Arabic love poet

== Moammar ==
- Moammar Rana, Pakistani actor
- Moammar "Moe" Szyslak, Character from The Simpsons

== Muamer ==
- Muamer Abdulrab, Qatari footballer
- Muamer Adžem, Bosnian professional footballer
- Muamer Avdić, Bosnian-Herzegovinian footballer
- Muamer AlMafrachi, Iraqi academic
- Muamer Bačevac, Serbian politicians
- Muamer Aissa Barsham, Qatari athlete
- Muamer Hukić, German professional boxer
- Muamer Salibašić, Bosnian-Herzegovinian footballer
- Muamer Svraka, Bosnian professional footballer
- Muamer Tanković, Swedish professional footballer
- Muamer Taletović, Bosnian retired basketball player
- Muamer Vugdalič, Slovenian footballer
- Muamer Zukorlić, Serbian politician

== Muammar ==
- Muammar Gaddafi (c. 1942–2011), former Libyan leader (1969–2011)
- Muammar Z.A., Indonesian renowned Qari

Surname

- Abdulaziz Al Muammar (1919–1984), Saudi Arabian technocrat

== Muammer ==
- Muammer Aksoy, Turkish politician
- Muammer N Aksoy, Turkish academic
- Muammer Güler, Turkish civil servant
- Muammer Sun, Turkish classical composer
- Muammer Şahin (born 1994), Turkish weightlifter
- Muammer Yıldırım, Turkish professional footballer
- Muammer Yilmaz, French-Turkish adventurer

== Moamar ==
- Moamar al-Eryani, Minister of Tourism in Yemen
- Moamar Maruhom, former mayor in the Philippines
- Moamar Gaddafi, alternate spelling of Muammar Gaddafi, the late leader of Libya (1969–2011)
