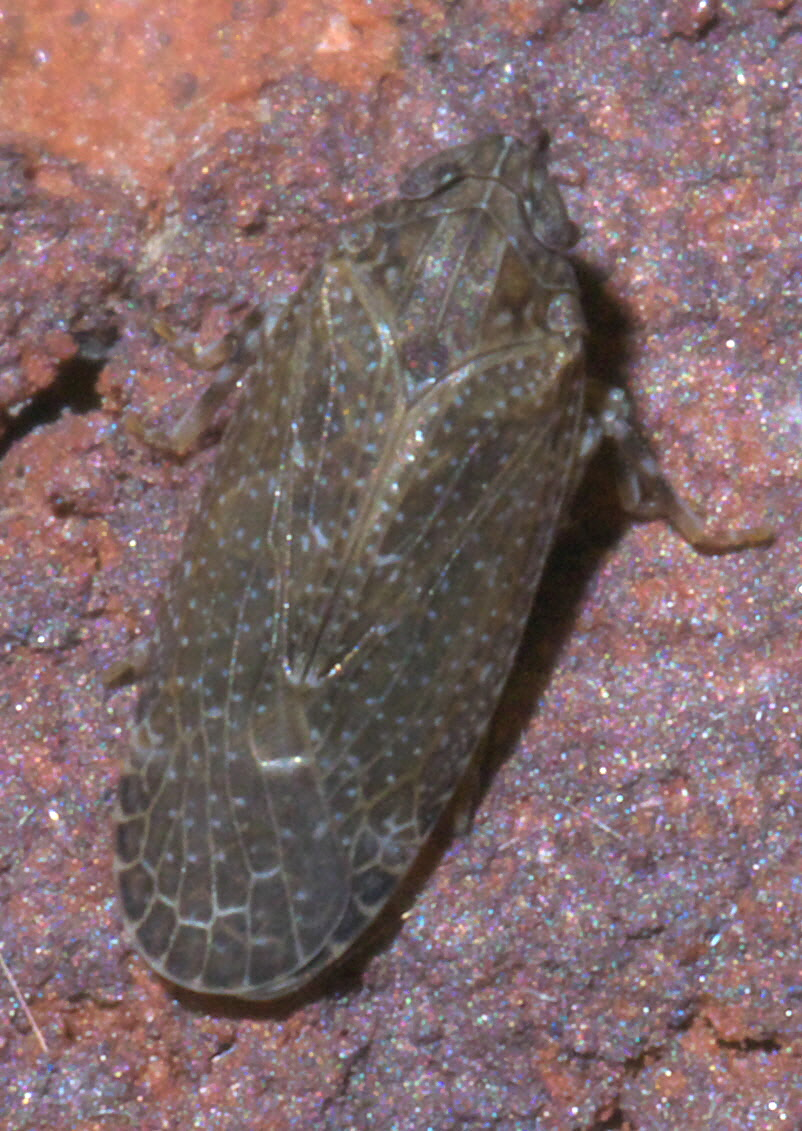
- Opsiplanon luellus

Scientific classification
- Domain: Eukaryota
- Kingdom: Animalia
- Phylum: Arthropoda
- Class: Insecta
- Order: Hemiptera
- Suborder: Auchenorrhyncha
- Infraorder: Fulgoromorpha
- Family: Achilidae
- Subfamily: Myconinae
- Tribe: Plectoderini
- Genus: Opsiplanon; Fennah, 1945

= Opsiplanon =

Genus of true bugs

Opsiplanon is a genus of achilid planthoppers in the family Achilidae. There are at least three described species in Opsiplanon.

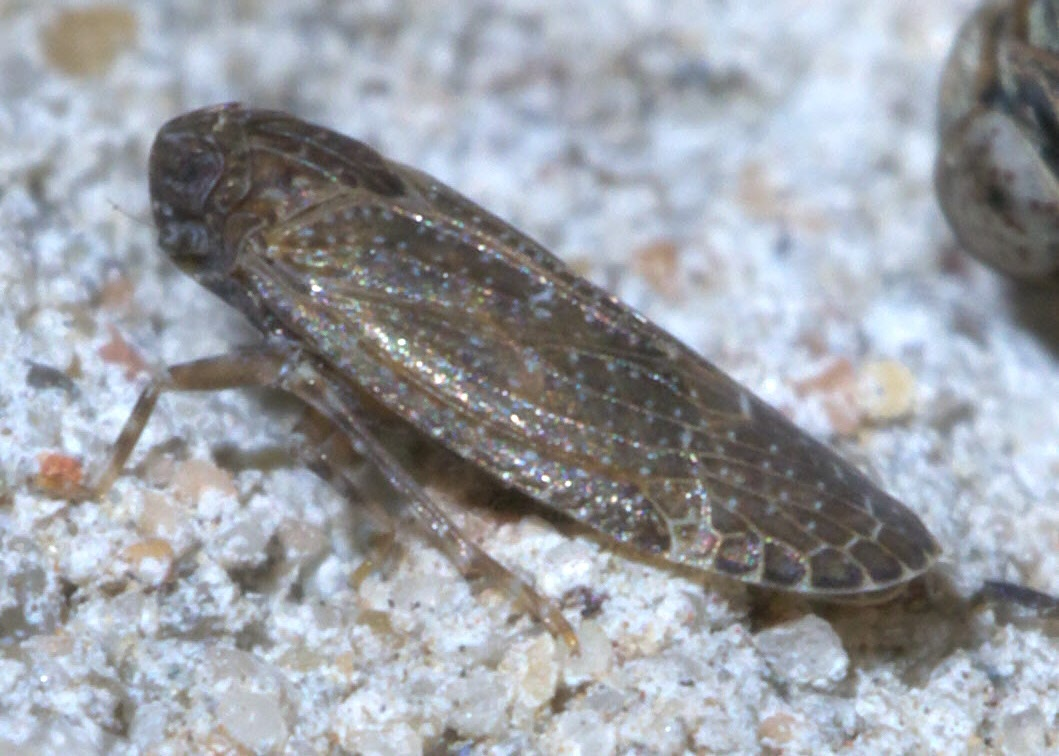
Opsiplanon luellus

== Species ==
These three species belong to the genus Opsiplanon:

- Opsiplanon luellus (Metcalf, 1923)^{c g b}
- Opsiplanon nemorosus Fennah, 1945^{c g}
- Opsiplanon ornatifrons Fennah, 1945^{c g}

Data sources: i = ITIS, c = Catalogue of Life, g = GBIF, b = Bugguide.net
