= Javesella atrata =

Scientific classification
- Kingdom: Animalia
- Phylum: Arthropoda
- Clade: Pancrustacea
- Class: Insecta
- Order: Hemiptera
- Suborder: Auchenorrhyncha
- Infraorder: Fulgoromorpha
- Family: Delphacidae
- Genus: Javesella
- Species: J. atrata

Binomial name
- Javesella atrata (Osborn, 1938)

Species of true bug

Javesella atrata is a species of delphacid planthopper in the family Delphacidae. It is found in North America.
