= Alticeps =

Scientific classification
- Domain: Eukaryota
- Kingdom: Animalia
- Phylum: Arthropoda
- Class: Insecta
- Order: Hemiptera
- Suborder: Auchenorrhyncha
- Infraorder: Fulgoromorpha
- Family: Achilidae
- Genus: Alticeps; Williams, 1977

Genus of insects

Alticeps is a genus of planthoppers belonging to the family Achilidae.

== Species ==
Species:

- Alticeps vigilis Williams, 1977
