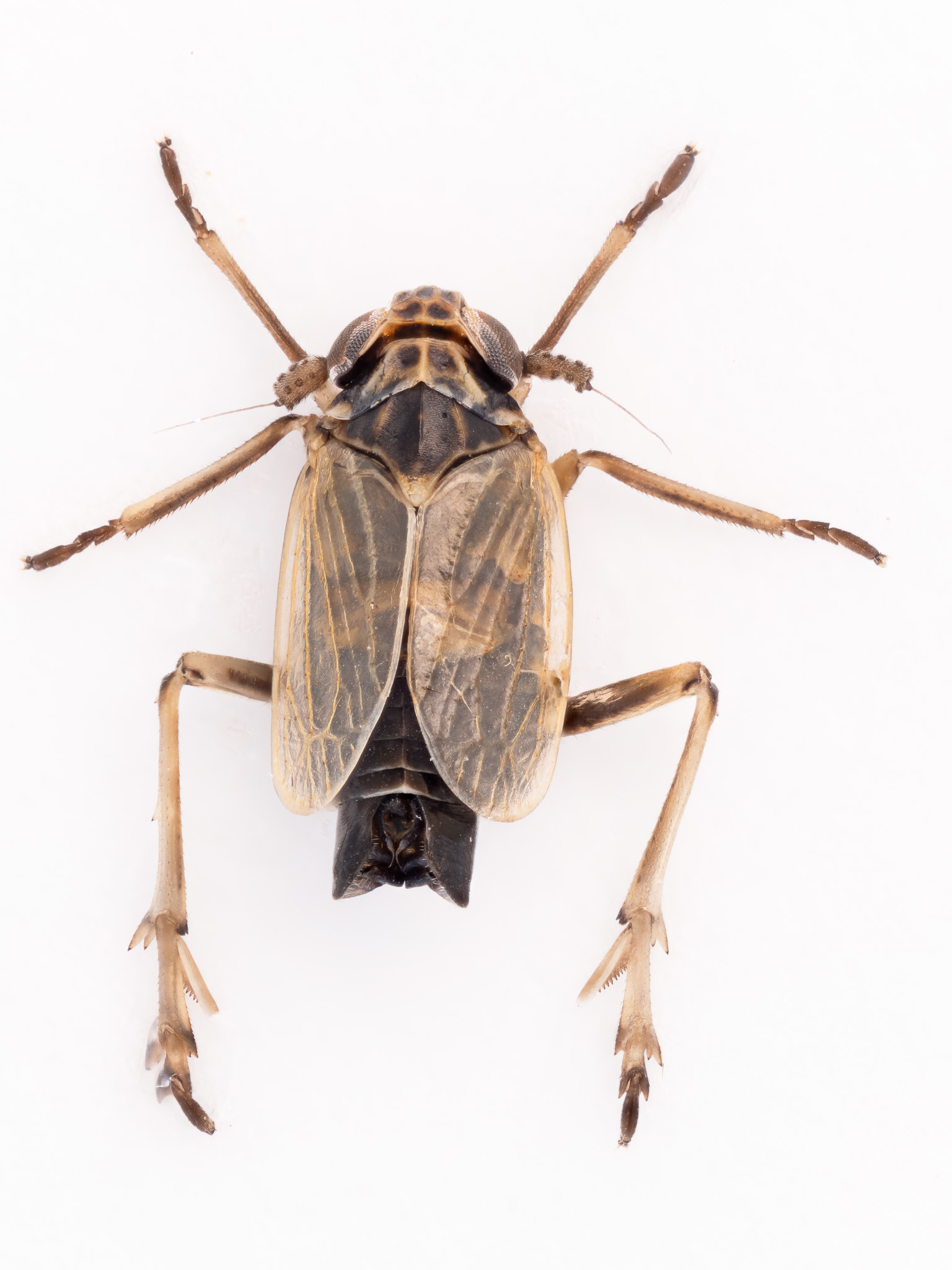

Scientific classification
- Kingdom: Animalia
- Phylum: Arthropoda
- Class: Insecta
- Order: Hemiptera
- Suborder: Auchenorrhyncha
- Infraorder: Fulgoromorpha
- Family: Delphacidae
- Genus: Javesella
- Species: J. bottnica

Binomial name
- Javesella bottnica (Huldén, 1974)

= Javesella bottnica =

Species of planthoppers

Javesella bottnica is a species of delphacid planthoppers belonging to the family Delphacidae. It is native to Europe in countries such as Germany, the Czech Republic, Sweden, Finland and parts of Russia (Karelia).
