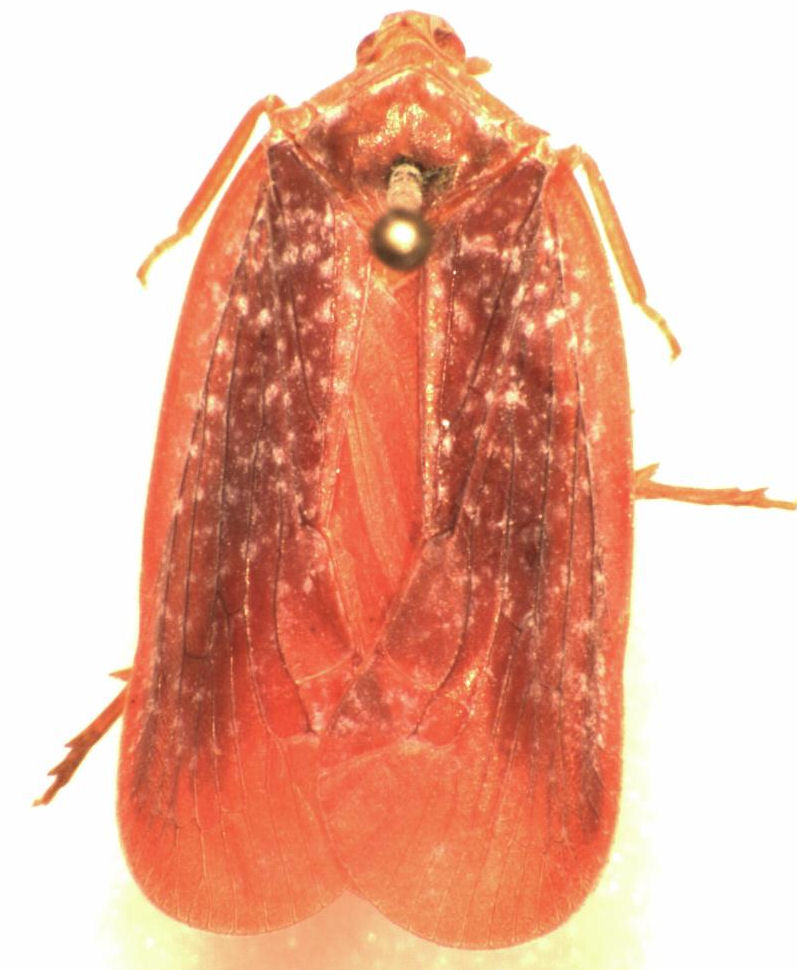

Scientific classification
- Domain: Eukaryota
- Kingdom: Animalia
- Phylum: Arthropoda
- Class: Insecta
- Order: Hemiptera
- Suborder: Auchenorrhyncha
- Infraorder: Fulgoromorpha
- Family: Achilidae
- Genus: Achilus
- Species: A. flammeus

Binomial name
- Achilus flammeus Kirby, 1818

= Achilus flammeus =

Red fungus bug

Species of true bug

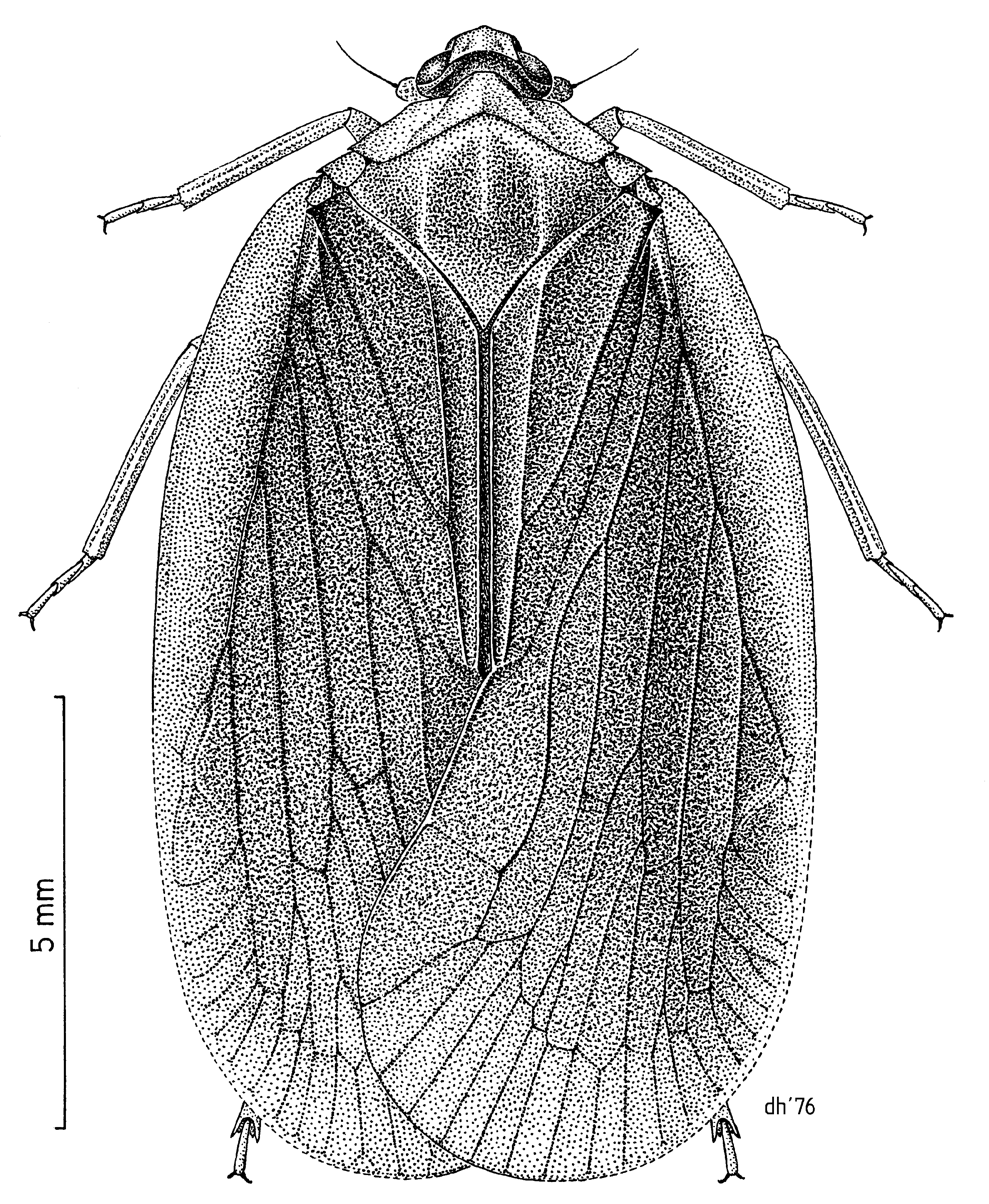
Achilus flammeus

Achilus flammeus, the red fungus bug, is a planthopper native to Australia, and accidentally introduced into Auckland, New Zealand.
