= Momar Njie =

Gambian footballer

Personal information
- Full name: Momar Njie
- Date of birth: 26 August 1975 (age 51)
- Place of birth: Nianija, the Gambia
- Height: 1.77 m (5 ft 10 in)
- Position: Defender

Team information
- Current team: SV Tasmania Berlin (co-trainer)

Senior career*
| Years | Team | Apps | (Gls) |
| 1998–2001 | Tennis Borussia Berlin II | 38 | (0) |
| 2000–2001 | Tennis Borussia Berlin | 7 | (0) |
| 2001–2002 | Kremser SC | | |
| 2002–2003 | SV Horn | | |
| 2003 | Borussia Fulda | 6 | (0) |
| 2004 | SV Yeşilyurt | 11 | (0) |
| 2005 | SV Tasmania-Gropiusstadt | 16 | (0) |
| 2005 | Reinickendorfer Füchse | 15 | (0) |
| 2006–2008 | BFC Preussen | 65 | (4) |
| 2008–? | Hilalspor Berlin | | |

International career
| 2003–2007 | Gambia | 5 | (0) |
- * Club domestic league appearances and goals

Momar Njie (born 26 August 1975 in Nianija) is a former Gambian footballer.

Njie gained 4 caps for his native Gambia during his playing career and is currently the co-trainer of Berlin-Liga side SV Tasmania Berlin.
