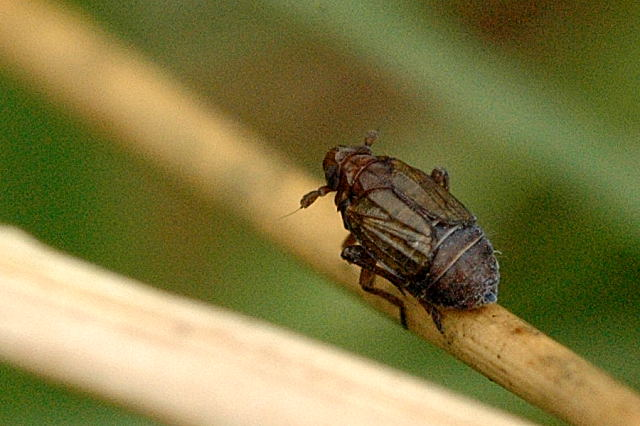
- Female

Scientific classification
- Kingdom: Animalia
- Phylum: Arthropoda
- Clade: Pancrustacea
- Class: Insecta
- Order: Hemiptera
- Suborder: Auchenorrhyncha
- Infraorder: Fulgoromorpha
- Family: Delphacidae
- Genus: Javesella
- Species: J. pellucida

Binomial name
- Javesella pellucida (Fabricius, 1794)

Synonyms
- Fulgora pellucida Fabricius, 1794; Delphacodes bilineata Metcalf, 1943; Delphax dispar Fallen, 1806; Liburnia flavipennis Sahlberg, 1871; Delphacodes flavotestacea Metcalf, 1943; Delphax frontalis Kirschbaum, 1868; Delphax fuscicollis Rey, 1891; Delphacodes griseoflava Metcalf, 1943; Delphax herrichii Kirschbaum, 1868; Fulgora marginata Fabricius, 1794; Liburnia obscura Fieber, 1879; Delphax ochroleuca Kirschbaum, 1868; Delphax stejnegeri Ashmead, 1899; Fulgora striata Fabricius, 1794; Delphax suturalis Curtis, 1837; Delphacodes testacea Metcalf, 1943; Delphax varicollis Rey, 1891

= Javesella pellucida =

Species of true bug

Javesella pellucida is a species of insect in the family Delphacidae. It is found in most of Europe, China, Georgia, India, Japan, Kazakhstan, Kyrgyzstan, Mongolia, Turkey, Uzbekistan, Algeria, Libya, Morocco, most of North America, Central America, Cuba and Puerto Rico.

The species feeds on Oryza sativa and Lolium multiflorum.
