= Abas unipunctata =

Scientific classification
- Domain: Eukaryota
- Kingdom: Animalia
- Phylum: Arthropoda
- Class: Insecta
- Order: Hemiptera
- Suborder: Auchenorrhyncha
- Infraorder: Fulgoromorpha
- Family: Achilidae
- Tribe: Plectoderini
- Genus: Abas; Fennah, 1950
- Species: A. unipunctata

Binomial name
- Abas unipunctata Fennah, 1950

Species of true bug

Abas unipunctata is a species of achilid planthopper in the family Achilidae. It is the only known species in the genus Abas. The genus and species were described by Ronald Gordon Fennah in 1950. It was described on the basis of a single female collected at Senahú, Alta Verapaz in Guatemala. The genus is distinguished from similar taxa in the tribe Plectoderini by the shape of the edges of the frons and pronotal disk.
