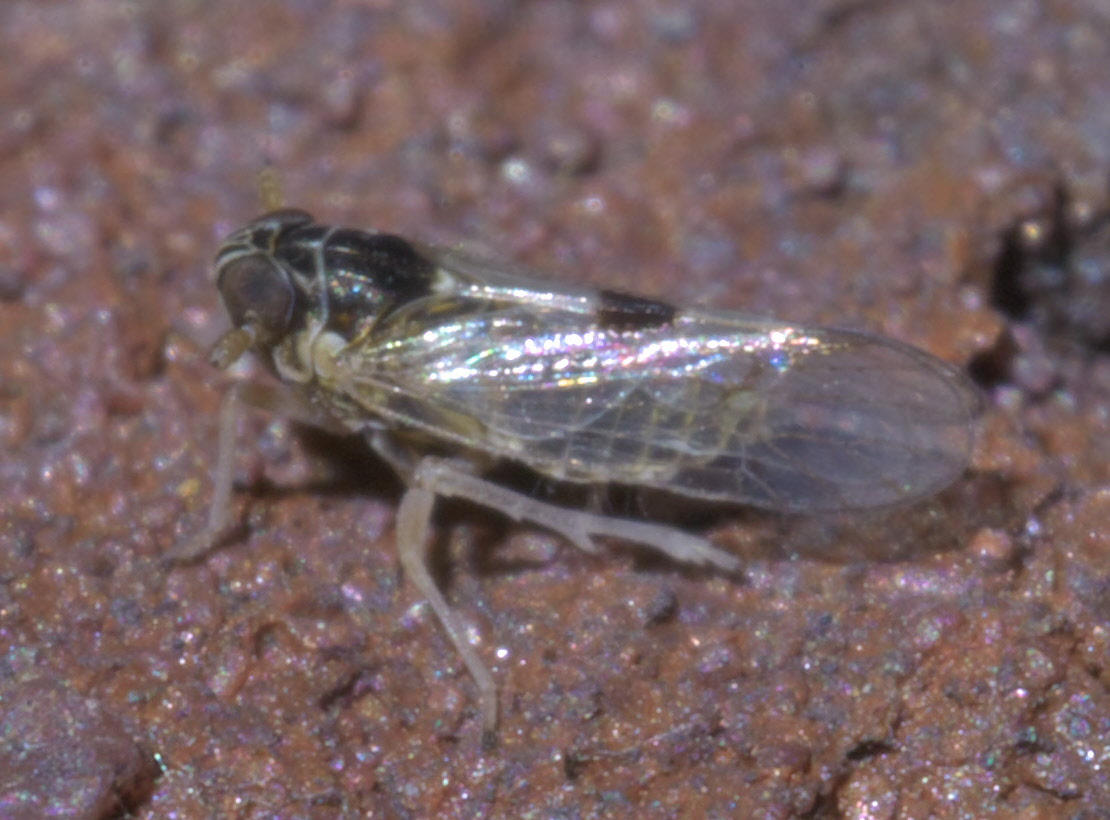

Scientific classification
- Domain: Eukaryota
- Kingdom: Animalia
- Phylum: Arthropoda
- Class: Insecta
- Order: Hemiptera
- Suborder: Auchenorrhyncha
- Infraorder: Fulgoromorpha
- Family: Delphacidae
- Genus: Nothodelphax
- Species: N. consimilis

Binomial name
- Nothodelphax consimilis (Van Duzee, 1897)

= Nothodelphax consimilis =

Species of true bug

Nothodelphax consimilis is a species of delphacid planthopper in the family Delphacidae. It is found in North America.

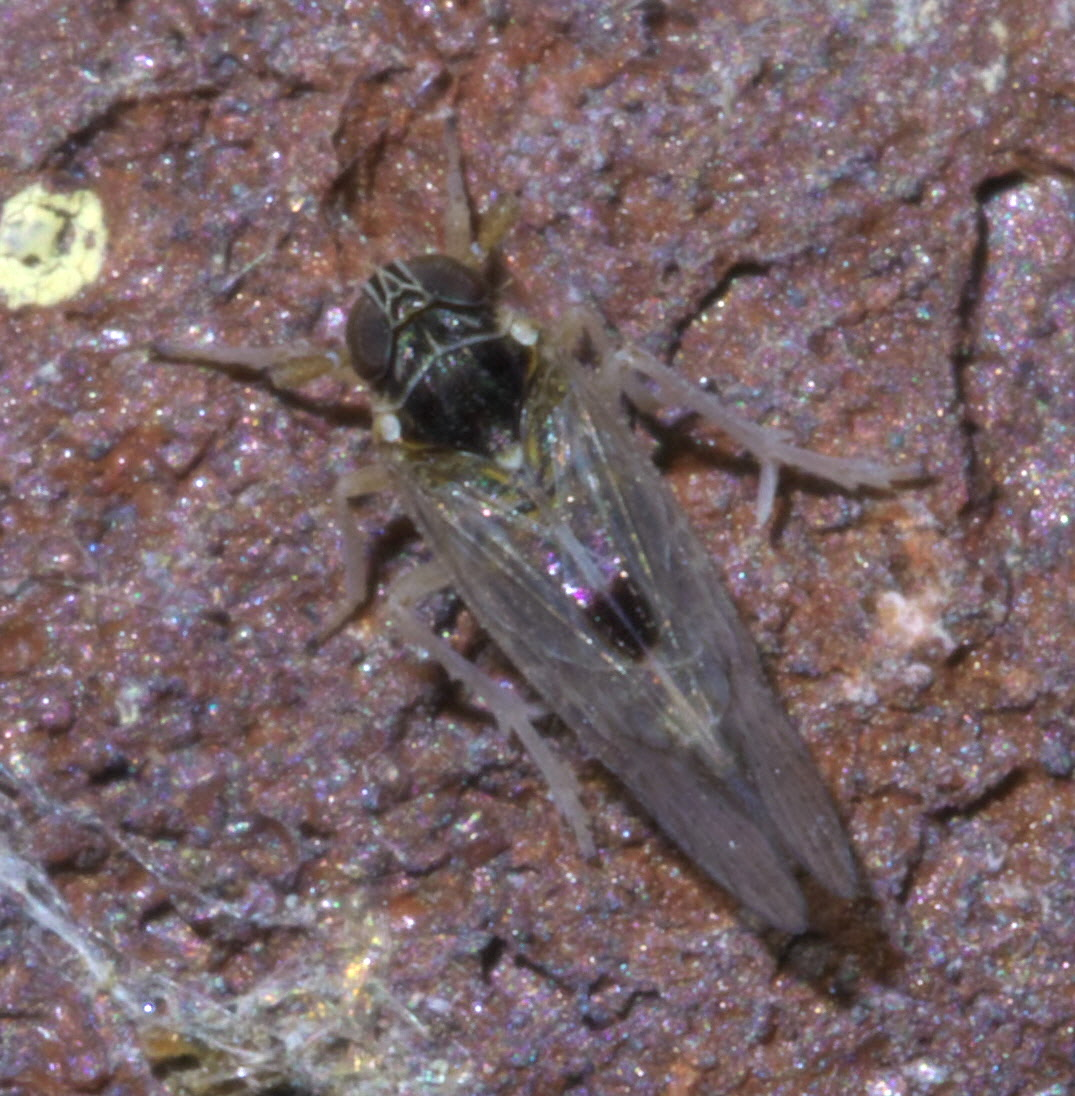
