= Messeis (planthopper) =

Scientific classification
- Domain: Eukaryota
- Kingdom: Animalia
- Phylum: Arthropoda
- Class: Insecta
- Order: Hemiptera
- Suborder: Auchenorrhyncha
- Infraorder: Fulgoromorpha
- Family: Achilidae
- Genus: Messeis; Stål, 1860

Genus of planthoppers

Messeis is a genus of planthoppers belonging to the family Achilidae.

Species:

- Messeis elidipteroides Fennah, 1950
- Messeis fuscovaria Stål, 1862
