= ACU =

ACU may refer to:

== Aviation ==
- Achutupo Airport in Guna Yala Region, Panama (IATA airport code ACU)

== Computing ==
- Address computation unit, another name for address generation unit
- Automatic Client Upgrade, a facility within the Novell Open Enterprise Server

== Education ==
- Abilene Christian University, a private Christian university in Abilene, Texas
- Ahram Canadian University, a private Egyptian university in 6th of October City, Giza, Egypt
- Ajayi Crowther University, a private Christian university in Oyo, Oyo State Nigeria
- American City University in California or Wyoming
- Arizona Christian University, a private Christian university in Phoenix, Arizona
- Association of Commonwealth Universities, an association that represents over 480 universities from Commonwealth countries
- Australian Catholic University, Australia's only public Catholic university

== Places ==
- Açu, municipality in the state of Rio Grande do Norte, Brazil
- Açu River, another name for the Piranhas River in Brazil
- Pariquera-Açu, a municipality in the state of São Paulo in Brazil
- Superporto do Açu, an industrial port complex in the state of Rio de Janeiro in Brazil

== Organizations ==
- Acu Publishing, an imprint of the German group VDM Publishing devoted to the reproduction of Wikipedia content
- Altura Credit Union, a credit union in California
- American Conservative Union, a political lobbying group in the US
- Arab Customs Union, an organization under the Arab League for a Customs Union between Arab Members of the League
- Asian Clearing Union, an organization that settles international payments between member countries
- Assiniboine Credit Union, a credit union in Manitoba
- Auto-Cycle Union, the governing body of motorcycle sport in Great Britain
- American Coalition for Ukraine, a coalition of organizations that advocate for US support of Ukraine's defence and sovereignty

== Military ==
- Army Combat Uniform, the combat uniform worn by the US Army, US Air Force, and US Space Force
- Assault Craft Unit, military units of the US Navy that specialize in amphibious warfare

== Transportation ==
- Auto-Cycle Union, an officially recognised motorcycle governing body of the UK
- Automovil Club del Uruguay, a member of the Fédération Internationale de l'Automobile

== Other uses ==
- ACU, a codon for the amino acid threonine
- ACU (Utrecht), a music venue in Utrecht, the Netherlands
- Armored Command Unit, the key unit in the RTS video game Supreme Commander
- Asian Currency Unit, a proposed unit of currency for Asia and Oceania
- Assassin's Creed Unity, a game set during the French Revolution
