= Muammer Yilmaz =

French adventurer, producer and author

Muammer Yilmaz is a French adventurer, producer, photographer and author. He was born in Colmar in Alsace.

In 2014, with Milan Bihlmann, he completed a world tour in 80 days without money.

== Biography ==
Muammer Yilmaz was born in Colmar in Alsace. He studied cinema and anthropology at the University of Strasbourg.

=== Adventurer ===
In 2012, Muammer Yilmaz made a documentary called Omo's People, about the people in the Omo Valley, including the Mursis and the Hamers. He also completed a photographic exposition, called At the End of the World - Ethiopia.

In 2013, Yilmaz joined a salt caravan with the Toubous nomads in the Sahara in Tchad. His documentary was called The Black Caravan.

Muammer Yilmaz has continued his adventures in more than 62 countries.

=== The World Tour in 80 Days Without Money ===
Inspired by Jules Verne since his childhood, Muammer dreamed of completing a world tour. In 2014, with Milan Bihlmann, he founded the Optimistic Traveler association. The association's mission was to prove that generosity and human goodness are universal. The founders pledged to complete a world tour in 80 days without access to money and other common resources. Muammer and Milan traveled more than 47,000 kilometers through 19 different countries, including France, Germany, Austria, Hungary, Romania, Bulgaria, Turkey, Iran, Pakistan, India, Thailand, Malaysia, Singapore, the United States, Morocco, and Spain. According to Muammer, traveling without money is "the best way to meet people". The two friends had to depend on the help of people they met to eat, sleep, and travel. According to Muammer and Milan, this approach removes fear of the unknown and demonstrates that people can count on others, regardless of their nationality, religion, or social status. The story of this journey, Around the World in 80 Days Without a Cent (Le tour du monde en 80 jours, sans argent) was published in 2015 by editions Michel Lafon. The author's proceeds from the book are being used for humanitarian support in Haiti, with help from the Haïti Care association.

Muammer's world tour led to new projects. In September 2015, in another collaboration with Milan, Muammer decided to travel through France without money in a 2CV, again with the goal to prove that one can always find hospitality and kindness in people. Starting in Strasbourg, they crossed France in 15 days, travelling through Lyon, Montpelier, Toulouse, Bordeaux, Nantes, Rennes, Caen and Paris. They created a documentary web-series in 2016 to retrace this adventure.

==== Homeless in Strasbourg ====
During the world tour, Muammer and Milan were witnesses to overwhelming generosity, but also experienced misery and distress at first hand, which led Muammer to imagine a support project for the homeless. In 2015, he initiated the project 0 Homeless in Strasbourg (0 SDF A Strasbourg). This is a project of solidarity, intended to foster social and economic integration for people living on the streets of Strasbourg.

=== Producer ===
Muammer discovered the art of film production during a trip to the USA when he was 17. He became a journalist, then a photographer and an independent producer.

To share his passions, Muammer created TvCampus in 2000 in Strasbourg. It is an association for students interested in all types of audio-visual pursuits from production to mounting. Muammer worked as a photojournalist from 2000 to 2008. In 2005, he launched a 48-hour video marathon in Strasbourg. This challenge consisted of producing a complete movie fiction in 2 days, including writing the script, shooting, editing, and distributing.

=== Tedx ===
Muammer shares his experiences in conferences across the world. In April 2016, Muammer shared his passions during the TEDxReset conference in Istanbul.

== Filmography ==
=== Documentary ===
- 2012, Norman weeding of Valonne (with Stéphane Henri de Tourville)
- 2013, The Black Caravan (co-directed with Philippe Frey).
- 2014, Omo's People (co-directed with Philippe Frey). Coproduced with Alsace20.

=== Short movies ===
- 2005, Double emploi
- 2006, Strasbourg evacuated
- 2006, Riverside Lovers
- 2007, At all cost
- 2007, Without Target
- 2008, Yes, I can
- 2008, Encorr
- 2009, Bad Luck in New York
- 2011, Charlie in Alsace

== Press and media ==
Muammer's projects have been broadcast in many medias around the world.
