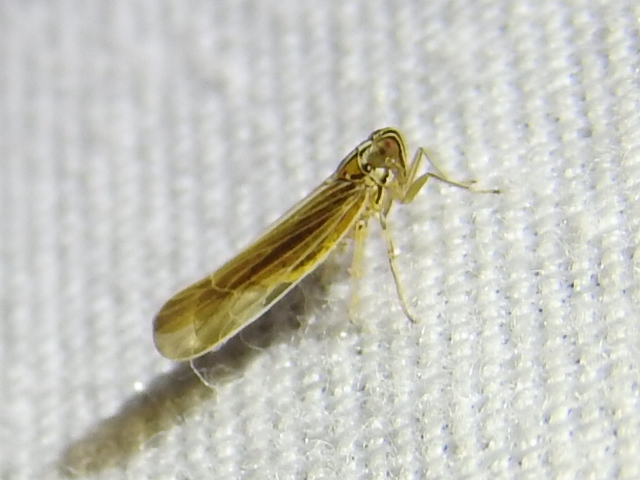

Scientific classification
- Domain: Eukaryota
- Kingdom: Animalia
- Phylum: Arthropoda
- Class: Insecta
- Order: Hemiptera
- Suborder: Auchenorrhyncha
- Infraorder: Fulgoromorpha
- Family: Delphacidae
- Genus: Nothodelphax
- Species: N. slossonae

Binomial name
- Nothodelphax slossonae (Ball, 1903)

Synonyms
- Liburnia breviceps (Dozier, 1922)

= Nothodelphax slossonae =

Species of true bug

Nothodelphax slossonae is a species of delphacid planthopper in the family Delphacidae. It is found in the Caribbean, Central America, and North America.
