= Kawanda (planthopper) =

Scientific classification
- Kingdom: Animalia
- Phylum: Arthropoda
- Class: Insecta
- Order: Hemiptera
- Suborder: Auchenorrhyncha
- Infraorder: Fulgoromorpha
- Family: Achilidae
- Genus: Kawanda; Fennah, 1950

Genus of true bugs

Kawanda is a genus of achilid planthoppers in the family Achilidae. There is at least one described species in Kawanda, K. luteovittata.
