= Deferunda (planthopper) =

Scientific classification
- Domain: Eukaryota
- Kingdom: Animalia
- Phylum: Arthropoda
- Class: Insecta
- Order: Hemiptera
- Suborder: Auchenorrhyncha
- Infraorder: Fulgoromorpha
- Family: Achilidae
- Genus: Deferunda

Genus of true bugs

Deferunda is a genus of achilid planthoppers in the family Achilidae. There are about 13 described species in Deferunda.

== Species ==
These 13 species belong to the genus Deferunda:

- Deferunda acuminata Chou & Wang, 1985^{c g}
- Deferunda albomaculata (Muir, 1922)^{c g}
- Deferunda diana Chen & He, 2010^{c g}
- Deferunda incompta Dlabola, 1961^{c g}
- Deferunda lineola (Matsumura, 1914)^{c g}
- Deferunda majella (Kirkaldy, 1906)^{c g}
- Deferunda philippina (Melichar, 1914)^{c g}
- Deferunda qiana Chen & He, 2010^{c g}
- Deferunda rubrostigmata (Matsumura, 1914)^{c g}
- Deferunda stigmatica Distant, 1912^{c g}
- Deferunda striata Wang & Liu, 2008^{c g}
- Deferunda trimaculata Wang & Peng, 2008^{c g}
- Deferunda truncata Chen, Yang & Wilson, 1989^{c g}

Data sources: i = ITIS, c = Catalogue of Life, g = GBIF, b = Bugguide.net
