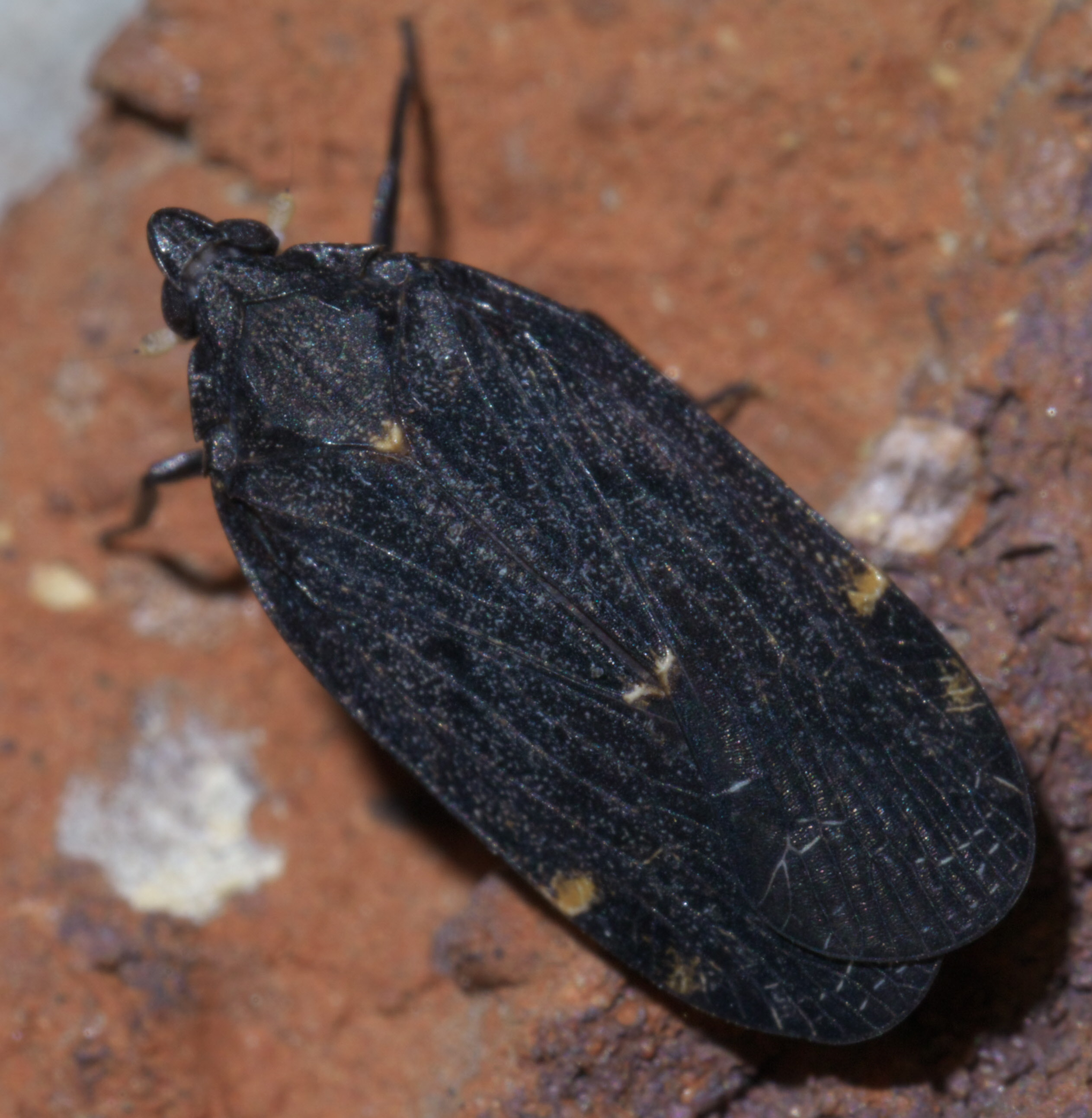
- Cixidia opaca

Scientific classification
- Domain: Eukaryota
- Kingdom: Animalia
- Phylum: Arthropoda
- Class: Insecta
- Order: Hemiptera
- Suborder: Auchenorrhyncha
- Infraorder: Fulgoromorpha
- Family: Achilidae
- Subfamily: Achilinae
- Genus: Cixidia; Fieber, 1866

= Cixidia =

Genus of true bugs

Cixidia is a genus of true bugs belonging to the family Achilidae.

The genus was first described by Franz Xaver Fieber in 1866.

The species of this genus are found in Europe and North America.

== Species ==
These species belong to the genus Cixidia:

- Cixidia advena (Spinola, 1839)
- Cixidia brittoni (Metcalf, 1923)
- Cixidia colorata (Van Duzee, 1908)
- Cixidia confinis (Zetterstedt, 1828) (Kiefernrindenzikade)
- Cixidia confusa (Beirne, 1950)
- Cixidia floridae
- Cixidia fusca (Walker, 1951)
- Cixidia fusiformis (Van Duzee, 1910)
- Cixidia genei (Spinola, 1839)
- Cixidia henshawi (Van Duzee, 1910)
- Cixidia kabakovi Emeljanov, 2005
- Cixidia kasparyani Anufriev, 1983
- Cixidia lapponica (Zetterstedt, 1840)
- Cixidia leptarcya (Amyot, 1847)
- Cixidia maghrebina Asche, 2015
- Cixidia manitobiana (Beirne, 1950)
- Cixidia marginicollis (Spinola, 1839)
- Cixidia maroccana Anufriev, 1969
- Cixidia mersinica (Dlabola, 1987)
- Cixidia misbeca (Amyot, 1847)
- Cixidia ochrophara (Amyot, 1847)
- Cixidia okunii (Matsumura, 1914)
- Cixidia opaca (Say, 1830)
- Cixidia pallida (Say, 1830)
- Cixidia parnassia (StÃ¥l, 1859)
- Cixidia pilatoi D'Urso & Guglielmino, 1995 (Echte Rindenzikade)
- Cixidia polias Emeljanov, 2005
- Cixidia sabecus (Amyot, 1847)
- Cixidia septentrionalis (Provancher, 1889)
- Cixidia shikokuana (Ishihara, 1954)
- Cixidia shoshone (Ball, 1933)
- Cixidia sikaniae D'Urso & Guglielmino, 1995
- Cixidia slossonae
- Cixidia slossoni (Van Duzee, 1908)
- Cixidia tristirops (Amyot, 1847)
- Cixidia ussuriensis (Kusnezov, 1928)
- Cixidia variegata (Van Duzee, 1908)
- Cixidia woodworthi (Van Duzee, 1916)
