= Myconus (planthopper) =

Scientific classification
- Kingdom: Animalia
- Phylum: Arthropoda
- Clade: Pancrustacea
- Class: Insecta
- Order: Hemiptera
- Suborder: Auchenorrhyncha
- Infraorder: Fulgoromorpha
- Family: Achilidae
- Subfamily: Myconinae
- Genus: Myconus; Stål, 1862

Genus of true bugs

Myconus is a genus of achilid planthoppers in the family Achilidae and the type genus of the subfamily Myconinae and tribe Myconini. Species of this genus have been recorded from South America and East Africa.

== Species ==
The following belong to the genus Myconus:

- Myconus collaris Melichar, 1904^{c g}
- Myconus conspersinervis (Stål, 1862)^{c g}
- Myconus jacquelinae Bahder & Bartlett, 2022
- Myconus trivittatus Fennah, 1950^{c g}
- Myconus uniformis (Metcalf, 1938)^{c g}

Data sources: i = ITIS, c = Catalogue of Life, g = GBIF, b = Bugguide.net
