= Epiona (planthopper) =

Scientific classification
- Domain: Eukaryota
- Kingdom: Animalia
- Phylum: Arthropoda
- Class: Insecta
- Order: Hemiptera
- Suborder: Auchenorrhyncha
- Infraorder: Fulgoromorpha
- Family: Achilidae
- Genus: Epiona

Genus of true bugs

Epiona is a genus of achilid planthoppers in the family Achilidae. There is at least one described species in Epiona, E. kirejtshuki.
