= Errada =

Scientific classification
- Kingdom: Animalia
- Phylum: Arthropoda
- Class: Insecta
- Order: Hemiptera
- Suborder: Auchenorrhyncha
- Infraorder: Fulgoromorpha
- Family: Achilidae
- Genus: Errada; Walker, 1868

Genus of insects

Errada is a genus of planthoppers belonging to the family Achilidae.

The species of this genus are found in Japan.

Species:

- Errada ambigua (Fowler, 1905)
- Errada backhoffi (Schmidt, 1926)
- Errada funesta Walker, 1870
- Errada ibukisana (Matsumura, 1914)
- Errada jozankeana (Matsumura, 1914)
- Errada nawae (Matsumura, 1914)
- Errada nebulosa (Distant, 1914)
- Errada niisimae (Matsumura, 1905)
- Errada vittata (Matsumura, 1914)
