= Nianija =

District of the Gambia

Coordinates: 13°45′N 15°05′W

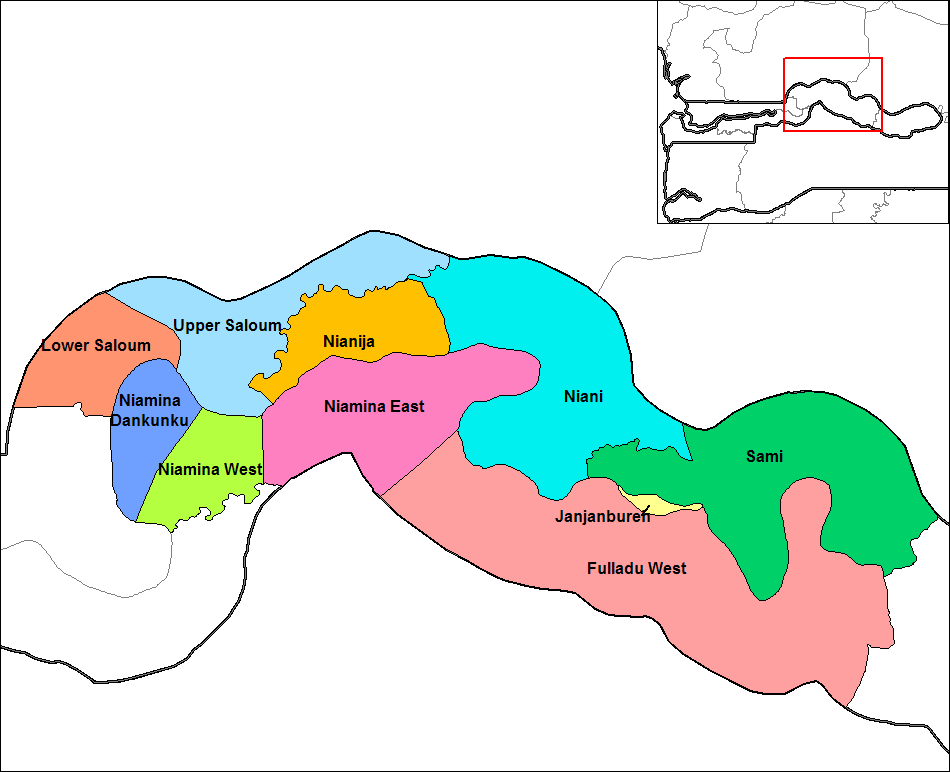
Districts of Central River Division

Nianija is one of the ten districts of the Central River Division of the Gambia. In the 2013 census, it had a population of 10,175.

Nanija is a predominantly Pulaar-speaking region of the Gambia. There are approximately 33 villages in Nianija, the capital of which is Chamen, located at the district's western edge. the chieftaincy has been mostly occupied by members of the Cham clan, the exception being the chieftaincy of Musa Bah of Kaiai village from 2001 to 2005 due to some political issues. But, it eventually went back to the rightful family (the Chams), that is the chieftaincy could only be obtained through paternal lineage within the Cham clan.

The district's only school serving grades 7–9, located in Chamen, was fought for and brought by one chief's son, who was also the headmaster. He played a very important role in the development of that area and the surrounding villages, and continued to help the people of Chamen until his death in 1985. His name was Abdoulie H. Cham, but the people called him Abdoulie Jarra (as it is in the fula community to have your mother's name attached to your name).

Though there are no official statistics to back the claim, Nianija is often said to be the poorest district in the Gambia. It is also the only district through which at least one of the Gambia's main roads does not pass.
