= Ilva (planthopper) =

Scientific classification
- Kingdom: Animalia
- Phylum: Arthropoda
- Class: Insecta
- Order: Hemiptera
- Suborder: Auchenorrhyncha
- Infraorder: Fulgoromorpha
- Family: Achilidae
- Subfamily: Apatesoninae
- Genus: Ilva

Genus of true bugs

Ilva is a genus of African planthoppers in the family Achilidae. There is one described species in Ilva, I. nigrosignata.
