= Mabira (planthopper) =

Scientific classification
- Domain: Eukaryota
- Kingdom: Animalia
- Phylum: Arthropoda
- Class: Insecta
- Order: Hemiptera
- Suborder: Auchenorrhyncha
- Infraorder: Fulgoromorpha
- Family: Achilidae
- Genus: Mabira

Genus of true bugs

Mabira is a genus of achilid planthoppers in the family Achilidae. There are at least four described species in Mabira.

== Species ==
These four species belong to the genus Mabira:

- Mabira cincticeps (Spinola, 1839)^{c g}
- Mabira karaseki (Melichar, 1905)^{c g}
- Mabira pallida Fennah, 1950^{c g}
- Mabira phylotas Fennah, 1957^{c g}

Data sources: i = ITIS, c = Catalogue of Life, g = GBIF, b = Bugguide.net
