= Altura Credit Union =

California financial institute

- Type: Credit union
- Industry: Financial services
- Founded: 1957
- Headquarters: 2847 Campus Pkwy Riverside, California, United States
- Number of locations: 19 full-service branches, 52 ATMs
- Area served: Riverside County
- Key people: Jennifer Binkley, President/CEO Jerry Rivera, Chairman
- Services: Savings and checking accounts, consumer loans, mortgages, credit cards, investments
- Number of employees: 293 (2026)
- Website: alturacu.com

Altura Credit Union (Altura) is a credit union headquartered in Riverside County, California. It is federally insured and state-chartered, offering checking and savings accounts, commercial and residential mortgage loans, and wealth management services. It also belongs to the CO-OP Financial Services interbank network.

== History ==
Altura Credit Union was founded in 1957 by Peggy Green, a secretary, as Riverside Schools Credit Union to provide financial services to employees of the Riverside County, California school district.

In 2015, Altura and Visterra Credit Union announced a merger but retained the Altura name. The merger, which was finalized on August 1, 2015, created a $1.1 billion credit union with 118,000 members.

In 2026, Forbes magazine listed Altura in its rankings of “America’s Best-In-State Credit Unions”.

== Operations ==
Membership in Altura is open to individuals who live, work, attend school, or worship in Riverside or San Diego Counties, or in the cities of Anaheim, Garden Grove, Irvine, or Santa Ana in Orange County, or Fontana, Ontario, or Rancho Cucamonga in San Bernardino County.

Altura operates a subsidiary, Auto Expert, which provides vehicle location and purchasing services to credit union members, including Altura’s, assisting them in buying new and used cars. In 2007, Auto Expert received the Gold Award from the California Award for Performance Excellence.

== 2025 government shutdown ==
Following the October 2025 U.S. federal government shutdown that left an estimated 750,000 federal employees without paychecks, according to the Congressional Budget Office, Altura launched an emergency loan program for affected members, offering loans at 0% interest for the first 90 days, advancing up to three months of net pay with no payments required during the initial period. Altura offered a similar program during the federal shutdown in 2018-2019.

== See also ==
- Credit unions in the United States
- Credit union service organization
- National Credit Union Administration
