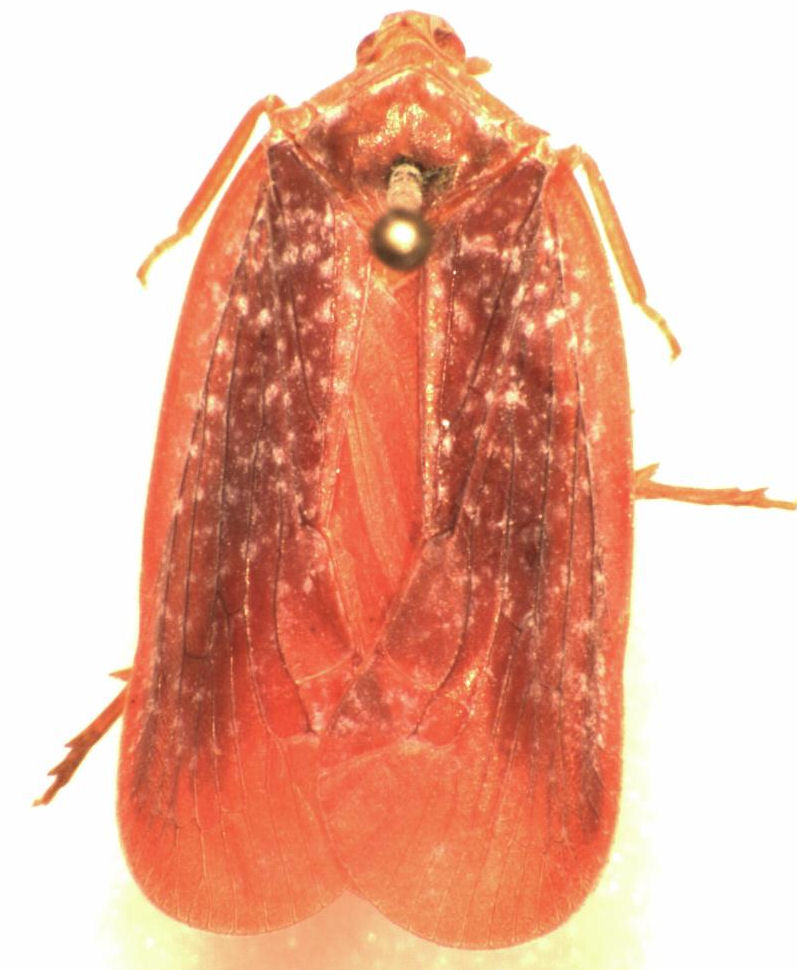
- Achilus flammeus

Scientific classification
- Domain: Eukaryota
- Kingdom: Animalia
- Phylum: Arthropoda
- Class: Insecta
- Order: Hemiptera
- Suborder: Auchenorrhyncha
- Infraorder: Fulgoromorpha
- Family: Achilidae
- Subfamily: Achilinae
- Genus: Achilus; Kirby, 1818

= Achilus =

Genus of insects

Achilus is the type genus of planthoppers of the family Achilidae. This may be a monotypic genus containing the type species Achilus flammeus.Kirby, 1818: which is the "red fingernail bug" and found in Australia. The placement of A. cixioides Spinola from Chile, is uncertain, but it may belong in Mnemosyne Stål, 1866 (Cixiinae}. The genus described by William Kirby in 1819.
