= Achilla (planthopper) =

Scientific classification
- Domain: Eukaryota
- Kingdom: Animalia
- Phylum: Arthropoda
- Class: Insecta
- Order: Hemiptera
- Suborder: Auchenorrhyncha
- Infraorder: Fulgoromorpha
- Family: Achilidae
- Subfamily: Achilinae
- Genus: Achilla; Haglund, 1899

Genus of insects

Achilla is a genus of planthoppers belonging to the family Achilidae.

Species:

- Achilla hecate Emeljanov, 1991
- Achilla marginatifrons Haglund, 1899
- Achilla nyx Emeljanov, 2005
