= Protepiptera =

Scientific classification
- Domain: Eukaryota
- Kingdom: Animalia
- Phylum: Arthropoda
- Class: Insecta
- Order: Hemiptera
- Suborder: Auchenorrhyncha
- Infraorder: Fulgoromorpha
- Family: Achilidae
- Subfamily: Achilinae
- Genus: †Protepiptera; Usinger, 1939

Extinct genus of insects

Protepiptera is a genus of fossil planthoppers belonging to the family Achilidae.

The species of this genus are found as inclusions in amber on the coasts of southern Baltic Sea.

== Species ==
Species:

- Protepiptera kaweckii Usinger, 1939
- Protepiptera reticulata Germar & Berendt, 1856
