= Elidiptera =

Scientific classification
- Domain: Eukaryota
- Kingdom: Animalia
- Phylum: Arthropoda
- Class: Insecta
- Order: Hemiptera
- Suborder: Auchenorrhyncha
- Infraorder: Fulgoromorpha
- Family: Achilidae
- Subfamily: Achilinae
- Genus: Elidiptera; Spinola, 1839

Genus of insects

Elidiptera is a genus of planthoppers belonging to the family Achilidae.

Species:

- Elidiptera callosa Spinola, 1839
- Elidiptera globulifera (Walker, 1858)
- Elidiptera guianae Walker, 1851
- Elidiptera regularis Scudder, 1890
- Elidiptera rutescens Walker, 1851
- Elidiptera stabilis Walker, 1858
