= Alsace20 =

French regional TV channel

Alsace 20
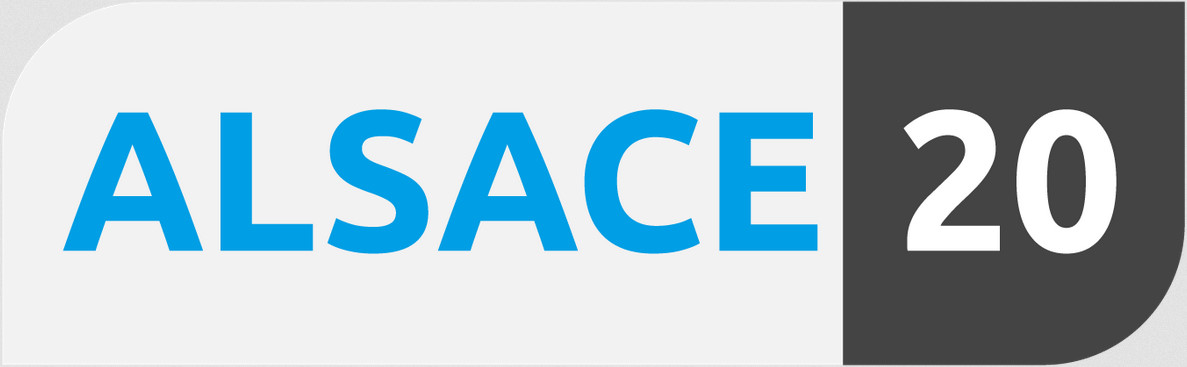
- Country: France
- Headquarters: 333A, Avenue de Colmar 67100 Strasbourg
- Regions: Alsace
- Owner: Altice Média
- Launch date: 2006
- Former names: Alsatic TV (from 2006 to 2009)
- Digital channels: Numericable : channel no 391, Vialis : channel no 30, Freebox TV : channel no 912, La TV d'Orange : channel no 358 or mosaic channel 30, SFR : channel no 289 and 503, Bouygues : channel no 349, Alice : channel no 216, Dartybox : channel no 318
- Official website: www.bfmtv.com/alsace/
- Language: French

Alsace 20, formerly Alsatic TV, is a French regional general-interest television channel covering Alsace, with offices in Strasbourg. Bought by Altice Média, Alsace 20 was renamed BFM Alsace on 28 June 2022.

== History ==
Named Alsatic TV when it started up in 2006, the channel was created on the initiative of two regional dailies, DNA and L'Alsace.

In September 2009, Alsatic TV became Alsace 20.

In 2012, with an audience of 300,000 viewers per week, the channel, present on DTT, was bought by Dominique Formhals from Crédit Mutuel. Dominique Formhals' company Aquatique Show, already present in the capital since the beginning, held 56% of the shares. The companies HDR (Daniel Trabucco), IFMO (Jean-Luc Bury), Stacco (Raymond Schweitzer) as well as the Chairman of SIG (Martial Bellon), in a personal capacity, completed the round table of shareholders.

Each year, Alsace 20 produces five hundred hours of programs with a budget of 1.5 million euros.

On June 25, 2021, Altice Média applied to the CSA for approval of the takeover by the Altice group of the company A.télé, which published Alsace 20 and provided details on the nature of the planned editorial project and the name of the service concerned by this operation.

The group bought Alsace 20 at the end of 2021 which became, on June 28, 2022, BFM Alsace.

== Slogan ==
- From 2006 to 2009 : « Proche de vous, avec vous »
- From 2009 to 2012 : « Unique comme vous »
- From 2012 to 2013 : « La seule chaîne 100% régionale »
- From 2013 to 2018 : « La chaîne Alsace »
- Since 2018 : « Votre télé au cœur de la vie alsacienne »

== Organization ==
- Editorial Secretary: Anna Britz
- Antenna Manager: Hassen Bahloul
- Communication and promotion manager: Célia Mérimèche
- Administrative manager: Charlotte Kirschner
