= Hooleya (planthopper) =

Scientific classification
- Domain: Eukaryota
- Kingdom: Animalia
- Phylum: Arthropoda
- Class: Insecta
- Order: Hemiptera
- Suborder: Auchenorrhyncha
- Infraorder: Fulgoromorpha
- Family: Achilidae
- Genus: Hooleya; Cockerell, 1922

Genus of insects

Hooleya is a genus of planthoppers belonging to the family Achilidae.

Species:

- Hooleya indecisa Cockerell, 1922
