= Magadha (planthopper) =

Scientific classification
- Domain: Eukaryota
- Kingdom: Animalia
- Phylum: Arthropoda
- Class: Insecta
- Order: Hemiptera
- Suborder: Auchenorrhyncha
- Infraorder: Fulgoromorpha
- Family: Achilidae
- Genus: Magadha

Genus of true bugs

Magadha is a genus of achilid planthoppers in the family Achilidae. There are at least 20 described species in Magadha.

== Species ==
These 22 species belong to the genus Magadha:

- Magadha basimaculata Long, Yang & Chen, 2014^{c g}
- Magadha cervina Fennah, 1956^{g}
- Magadha densimaculosa Long, Yang & Chen, 2014^{c g}
- Magadha eusordida Chen, Yang & Wilson, 1989^{c g}
- Magadha fennahi Liang, 2007^{c g}
- Magadha flavisigna (Walker, 1851)^{c g}
- Magadha formosana Matsumura, 1914^{c g}
- Magadha guangdongensis Chou & Wang, 1985^{c g}
- Magadha guangzhouensi Wang, 1989^{c g}
- Magadha gyirongensis Wang & Wang, 1988^{c g}
- Magadha intumescentia Long, Yang & Chen, 2014^{c g}
- Magadha metasequoiae Fennah, 1956^{c g}
- Magadha nebulosa Distant, 1906^{c g}
- Magadha pinnata Chen, Yang & Wilson, 1989^{c g}
- Magadha redunca Chen, Yang & Wilson, 1989^{c g}
- Magadha semitransversa Chen, Yang & Wilson, 1989^{c g}
- Magadha shaanxiensis Chou & Wang, 1985^{c g}
- Magadha taibaishanensis Wang, 1989^{c g}
- Magadha w-maculata Chou & Wang, 1985^{c g}
- Magadha wuyishanana Chou & Wang, 1985^{c g}
- Magadha yadongensis Wang & Wang, 1988^{c g}
- Magadha yangia Wang & Huang, 1995^{c g}

Data sources: i = ITIS, c = Catalogue of Life, g = GBIF, b = Bugguide.net
