= Cernea (planthopper) =

Scientific classification
- Domain: Eukaryota
- Kingdom: Animalia
- Phylum: Arthropoda
- Class: Insecta
- Order: Hemiptera
- Suborder: Auchenorrhyncha
- Infraorder: Fulgoromorpha
- Family: Achilidae
- Genus: Cernea

Genus of true bugs

Cernea is a genus of achilid planthoppers in the family Achilidae. There is at least one described species in Cernea, C. insularis.
