= Kosalya (planthopper) =

Scientific classification
- Domain: Eukaryota
- Kingdom: Animalia
- Phylum: Arthropoda
- Class: Insecta
- Order: Hemiptera
- Suborder: Auchenorrhyncha
- Infraorder: Fulgoromorpha
- Family: Achilidae
- Genus: Kosalya; Distant, 1906

Genus of true bugs

Kosalya is a genus of achilid planthoppers in the family Achilidae. There are about seven described species in Kosalya.

== Species ==
These seven species belong to the genus Kosalya:

- Kosalya circumscripta^{g}
- Kosalya concludens Emeljanov, 2005^{c g}
- Kosalya curvusanusa^{g}
- Kosalya dilatata Chen, Yang & Wilson, 1989^{c g}
- Kosalya flavostrigata Distant, 1906^{c g}
- Kosalya improcera Chen, Yang & Wilson, 1989^{c g}
- Kosalya unimaculata^{g}

Data sources: i = ITIS, c = Catalogue of Life, g = GBIF, b = Bugguide.net
