= Quadrana =

Scientific classification
- Domain: Eukaryota
- Kingdom: Animalia
- Phylum: Arthropoda
- Class: Insecta
- Order: Hemiptera
- Suborder: Auchenorrhyncha
- Infraorder: Fulgoromorpha
- Family: Achilidae
- Genus: Quadrana; Caldwell, 1951

Genus of insects

Quadrana is a genus of planthoppers belonging to the family Achilidae.

== Species ==
Species:

- Quadrana punctata Caldwell, 1951
