= Francesca (planthopper) =

Scientific classification
- Domain: Eukaryota
- Kingdom: Animalia
- Phylum: Arthropoda
- Class: Insecta
- Order: Hemiptera
- Suborder: Auchenorrhyncha
- Infraorder: Fulgoromorpha
- Family: Achilidae
- Genus: Francesca; Kirkaldy, 1906

Genus of true bugs

Francesca is a genus of achilid planthoppers in the family Achilidae. There are at least two described species in Francesca.

== Species ==
These two species belong to the genus Francesca:

- Francesca saleminophila Kirkaldy, 1906^{c g}
- Francesca sparsa Jacobi, 1928^{c g}

Data sources: i = ITIS, c = Catalogue of Life, g = GBIF, b = Bugguide.net
