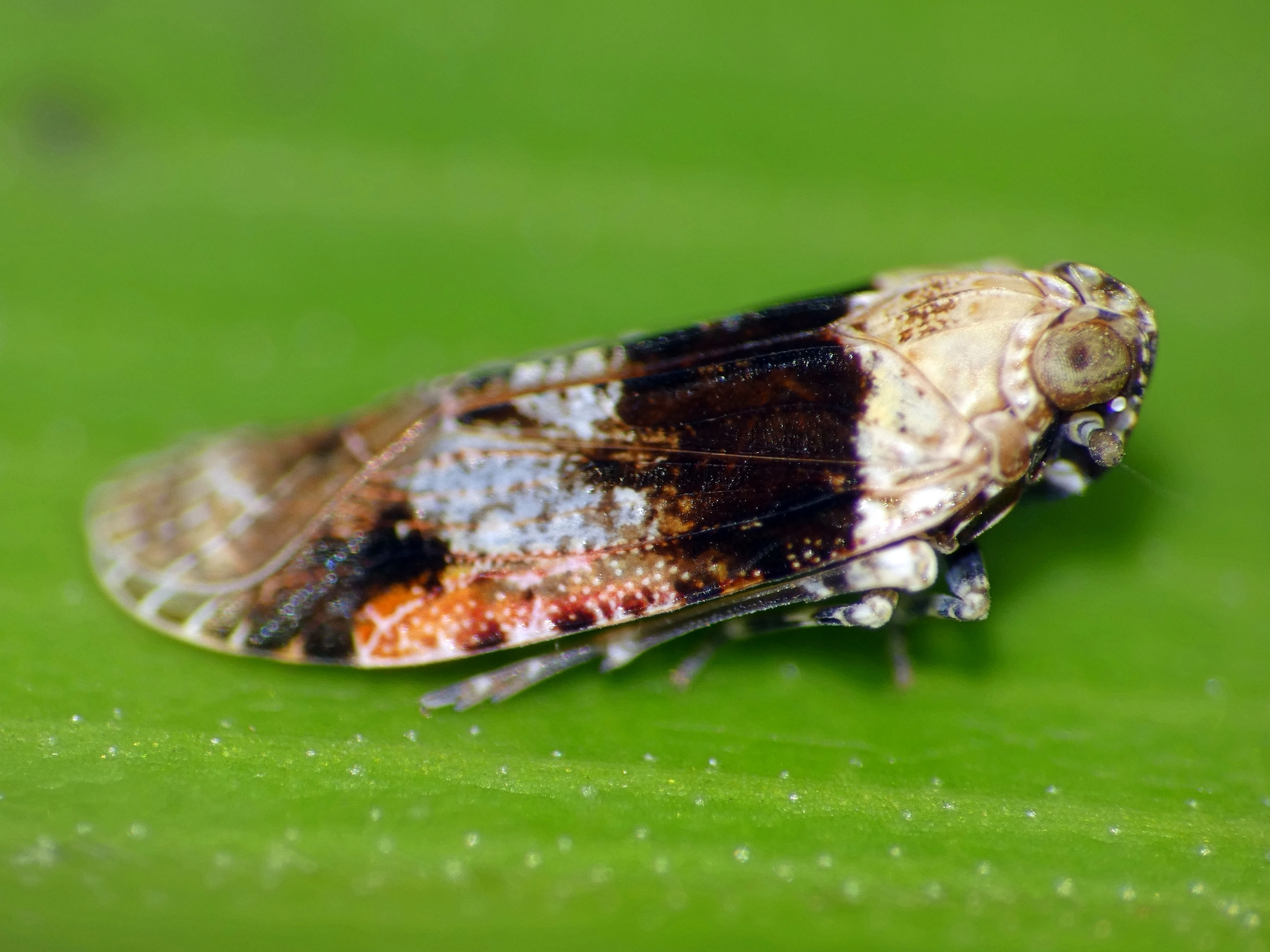
- Mahuna obscura

Scientific classification
- Kingdom: Animalia
- Phylum: Arthropoda
- Clade: Pancrustacea
- Class: Insecta
- Order: Hemiptera
- Suborder: Auchenorrhyncha
- Infraorder: Fulgoromorpha
- Family: Achilidae
- Genus: Mahuna; Distant, 1907

= Mahuna =

Genus of insects

Mahuna is a genus of planthoppers belonging to the family Achilidae.

== Species ==
Species:

- Mahuna battis Fennah, 1969
- Mahuna conspersa Distant, 1907
- Mahuna nebulosa Jacobi, 1928
- Mahuna obscura Jacobi, 1928
- Mahuna viridicans Jacobi, 1928
