= Hamba (planthopper) =

Scientific classification
- Kingdom: Animalia
- Phylum: Arthropoda
- Clade: Pancrustacea
- Class: Insecta
- Order: Hemiptera
- Suborder: Auchenorrhyncha
- Infraorder: Fulgoromorpha
- Family: Achilidae
- Genus: Hamba; Distant, 1907

Genus of true bugs

Hamba is a genus of achilid planthoppers in the family Achilidae. There are at least four described species in Hamba.

== Species ==
These four species belong to the genus Hamba:

- Hamba bisulca Chen, Yang & Wilson, 1989^{c g}
- Hamba inclinata (Walker, 1857)^{c g}
- Hamba perplexa (Walker, 1857)^{c g}
- Hamba seleucus Fennah, 1978^{c g}

Data sources: i = ITIS, c = Catalogue of Life, g = GBIF, b = Bugguide.net
