= Gordiacea (planthopper) =

Scientific classification
- Domain: Eukaryota
- Kingdom: Animalia
- Phylum: Arthropoda
- Class: Insecta
- Order: Hemiptera
- Suborder: Auchenorrhyncha
- Infraorder: Fulgoromorpha
- Family: Achilidae
- Genus: Gordiacea

Genus of true bugs

Gordiacea is a genus of achilid planthoppers in the family Achilidae. There are at least two described species in Gordiacea.

== Species ==
These two species belong to the genus Gordiacea:

- Gordiacea oculata (Melichar, 1903)^{c g}
- Gordiacea patula (Chen, Yang & Wilson, 1989)^{c g}

Data sources: i = ITIS, c = Catalogue of Life, g = GBIF, b = Bugguide.net
