= Cnidus (planthopper) =

Scientific classification
- Domain: Eukaryota
- Kingdom: Animalia
- Phylum: Arthropoda
- Class: Insecta
- Order: Hemiptera
- Suborder: Auchenorrhyncha
- Infraorder: Fulgoromorpha
- Family: Achilidae
- Genus: Cnidus; Stål, 1866

Synonyms
- Necho Jacobi, 1910

Genus of true bugs

Cnidus is a genus of African planthoppers in the family Achilidae. There are about 19 described species in Cnidus.

== Species ==
These 12 species belong to the genus Cnidus:

- Cnidus akaensis Synave, 1962^{c g}
- Cnidus bingervillei Synave, 1965^{c g}
- Cnidus candidus Synave, 1971^{c}
- Cnidus conspersus Synave, 1965^{c}
- Cnidus fuscospersus (Synave, 1957)^{c}
- Cnidus marmoratus (Jacobi, 1910)^{c}
- Cnidus morosus Synave, 1971^{c}
- Cnidus naevius (Jacobi, 1910)^{c}
- Cnidus ndelelensis Synave, 1962^{c g}
- Cnidus pallidus Synave, 1959^{c}
- Cnidus striatifrons Synave, 1959^{c g}
- Cnidus variegatus (Stål, 1855)^{c g}

Data sources: i = ITIS, c = Catalogue of Life, g = GBIF, b = Bugguide.net
