= Cythna (planthopper) =

Scientific classification
- Domain: Eukaryota
- Kingdom: Animalia
- Phylum: Arthropoda
- Class: Insecta
- Order: Hemiptera
- Suborder: Auchenorrhyncha
- Infraorder: Fulgoromorpha
- Family: Achilidae
- Genus: Cythna; Kirkaldy, 1906

Genus of true bugs

Cythna is a genus of achilid planthoppers in the family Achilidae. There are at least three described species in Cythna.

== Species ==
These three species belong to the genus Cythna:

- Cythna fusca Muir, 1927^{c g}
- Cythna glabra Haupt, 1926^{c g}
- Cythna laon Kirkaldy, 1906^{c g}

Data sources: i = ITIS, c = Catalogue of Life, g = GBIF, b = Bugguide.net
