= Callichlamys (planthopper) =

Scientific classification
- Kingdom: Animalia
- Phylum: Arthropoda
- Clade: Pancrustacea
- Class: Insecta
- Order: Hemiptera
- Suborder: Auchenorrhyncha
- Infraorder: Fulgoromorpha
- Family: Achilidae
- Subfamily: Myconinae
- Tribe: Plectoderini
- Genus: Callichlamys; Kirkaldy, 1907

Genus of planthoppers

Callichlamys is a genus of planthoppers, those planthoppers of the family Achilidae. The genus was described in 1907.
