= Spino (planthopper) =

Scientific classification
- Kingdom: Animalia
- Phylum: Arthropoda
- Class: Insecta
- Order: Hemiptera
- Suborder: Auchenorrhyncha
- Infraorder: Fulgoromorpha
- Family: Achilidae
- Genus: Spino; Fennah, 1950
- Species: S. notatus

Binomial name
- Spino notatus (Fowler, 1904)

Genus of true bugs

Spino is a genus of achilid planthoppers in the family Achilidae, found in Central America. It is monotypic, including only the species Spino notatus.
