= Rhinocolura championi =

Scientific classification
- Domain: Eukaryota
- Kingdom: Animalia
- Phylum: Arthropoda
- Class: Insecta
- Order: Hemiptera
- Suborder: Auchenorrhyncha
- Infraorder: Fulgoromorpha
- Family: Achilidae
- Genus: Rhinocolura; Fennah, 1950
- Species: R. championi

Binomial name
- Rhinocolura championi (Fowler, 1904)

Species of insect

Rhinocolura is a monotypic genus of planthoppers belonging to the family Achilidae. The only species is Rhinocolura championi.
