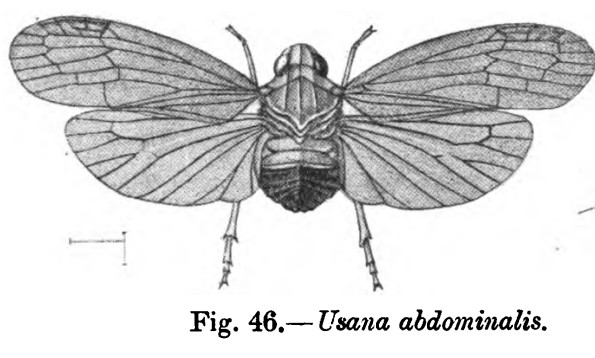
- Usana abdominalis

Scientific classification
- Kingdom: Animalia
- Phylum: Arthropoda
- Clade: Pancrustacea
- Class: Insecta
- Order: Hemiptera
- Suborder: Auchenorrhyncha
- Infraorder: Fulgoromorpha
- Family: Achilidae
- Genus: Usana; Distant, 1906

= Usana (planthopper) =

Genus of true bugs

Usana is a genus of achilid planthoppers in the family Achilidae. There are about 10 described species in Usana.

== Species ==
These 10 species belong to the genus Usana:

- Usana abdominalis Distant, 1916^{c g}
- Usana aspergilliformis Long, Yang & Chen, 2015^{c g}
- Usana concava Long, Yang & Chen, 2015^{c g}
- Usana congjiangensis Long, Yang & Chen, 2015^{c g}
- Usana demochares Fennah, 1978^{c g}
- Usana fissura Long, Yang & Chen, 2015^{c g}
- Usana lineolalis Distant, 1906^{c g}
- Usana oblongincisa Long, Yang & Chen, 2015^{c g}
- Usana unispina Long, Yang & Chen, 2015^{c g}
- Usana yanonis Matsumura, 1914^{c g}

Data sources: i = ITIS, c = Catalogue of Life, g = GBIF, b = Bugguide.net
