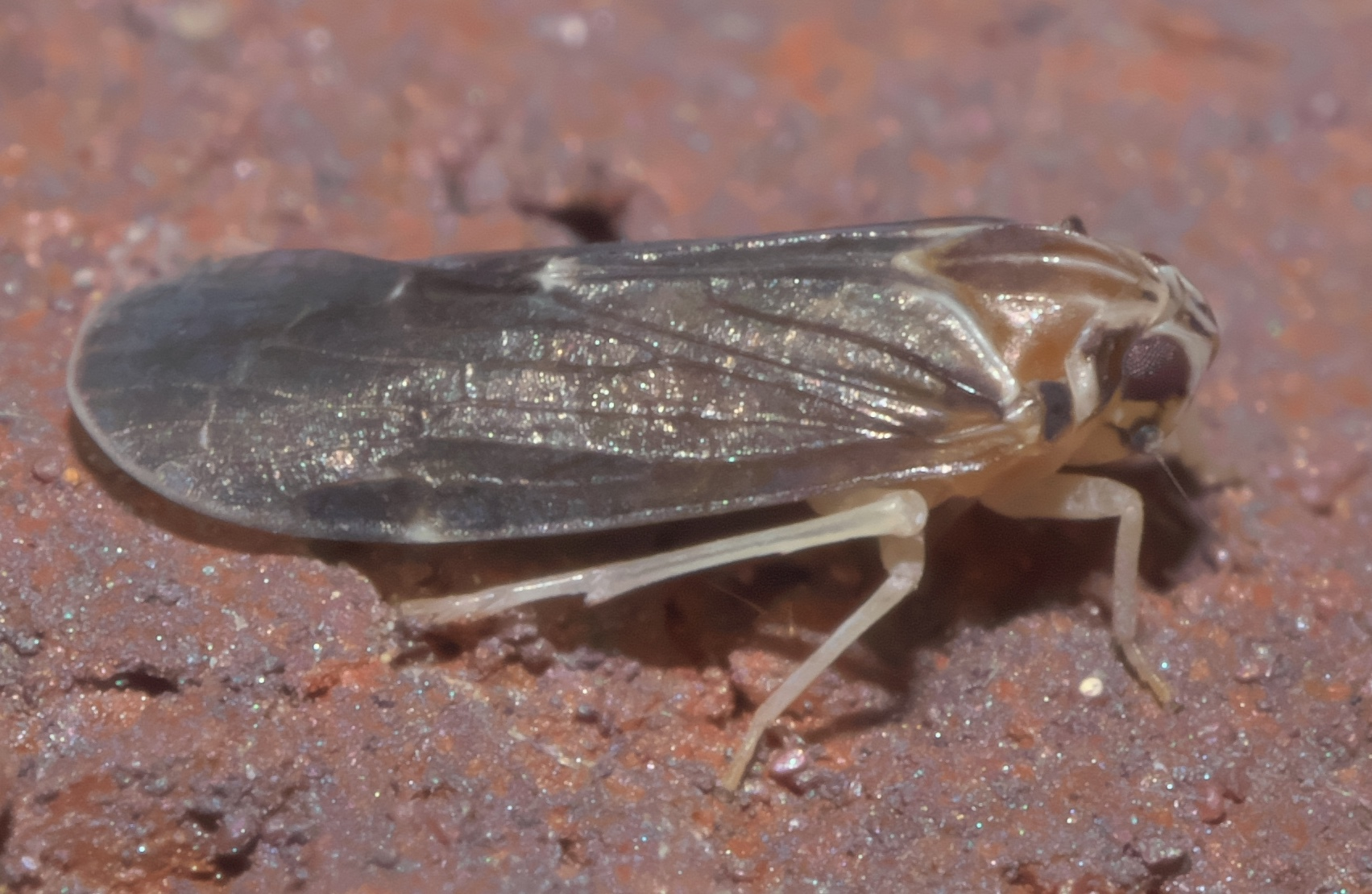
- Synecdoche impunctata

Scientific classification
- Domain: Eukaryota
- Kingdom: Animalia
- Phylum: Arthropoda
- Class: Insecta
- Order: Hemiptera
- Suborder: Auchenorrhyncha
- Infraorder: Fulgoromorpha
- Family: Achilidae
- Tribe: Plectoderini
- Genus: Synecdoche; O'Brien, 1971

= Synecdoche (planthopper) =

Genus of planthoppers

Synecdoche is a genus of planthoppers comprising 22 described species in the family Achilidae. All species are New World in distribution, primarily Nearctic. Their immature stages (nymphs) are commonly encountered associated with fungus (usually in logs).

== Species ==
These 22 species belong to the genus Synecdoche:

- Synecdoche albicosta (Van Duzee, 1917)^{c g}
- Synecdoche autumnalis O'Brien, 1971^{c g}
- Synecdoche bifoveata O'Brien, 1971^{c g}
- Synecdoche cara (Van Duzee, 1910)^{c g b}
- Synecdoche clara (Van Duzee, 1917)^{c g}
- Synecdoche constellata (Ball, 1933)^{c g b}
- Synecdoche costata (Van Duzee, 1910)^{c g}
- Synecdoche dimidiata (Van Duzee, 1910)^{c g b}
- Synecdoche flavicosta O'Brien, 1971^{c g}
- Synecdoche fusca (Van Duzee, 1908)^{c g}
- Synecdoche grisea (Van Duzee, 1908)^{c g b}
- Synecdoche helenae (Van Duzee, 1918)^{c g b}
- Synecdoche hypenor Fennah, 1978^{c g}
- Synecdoche impunctata (Fitch, 1851)^{c g b}
- Synecdoche irrorata (Van Duzee, 1914)^{c g}
- Synecdoche necopina (Van Duzee, 1918)^{c g}
- Synecdoche nemoralis (Van Duzee, 1916)^{c g b}
- Synecdoche nervata (Van Duzee, 1910)^{c g}
- Synecdoche ocellata O'Brien, 1971^{c g}
- Synecdoche pseudonervata O'Brien, 1971^{c g}
- Synecdoche rubella (Van Duzee, 1910)^{c g b}
- Synecdoche tricolor O'Brien, 1971^{c g}

Data sources: i = ITIS, c = Catalogue of Life, g = GBIF, b = Bugguide.net
