= Ronald Gordon Fennah =

English entomologist (1910–1987)

Ronald Gordon Fennah (1910 – 19 August 1987) was an English entomologist who specialised in the systematics of the Fulgoroidea and worked in the Caribbean Islands and at the Commonwealth Institute of Entomology.

Fennah was born in Ludlow and graduated from Cambridge University after which he worked at the Imperial College of Tropical Agriculture in Trinidad. He later became an entomologist in the Trinidad Department of Agriculture where he worked on the pests of citrus, cococa, and sugarcane. He examined the toxicity of DDT by ingesting and applying it on his own skin in 1944. Fennah moved to London to work at the Commonwealth Institute of Entomology in 1958, becoming its director in 1969 and retiring in 1975. He worked on the systematics of the Auchenorrhyncha and received an Sc.D. from Cambridge University in 1967.
