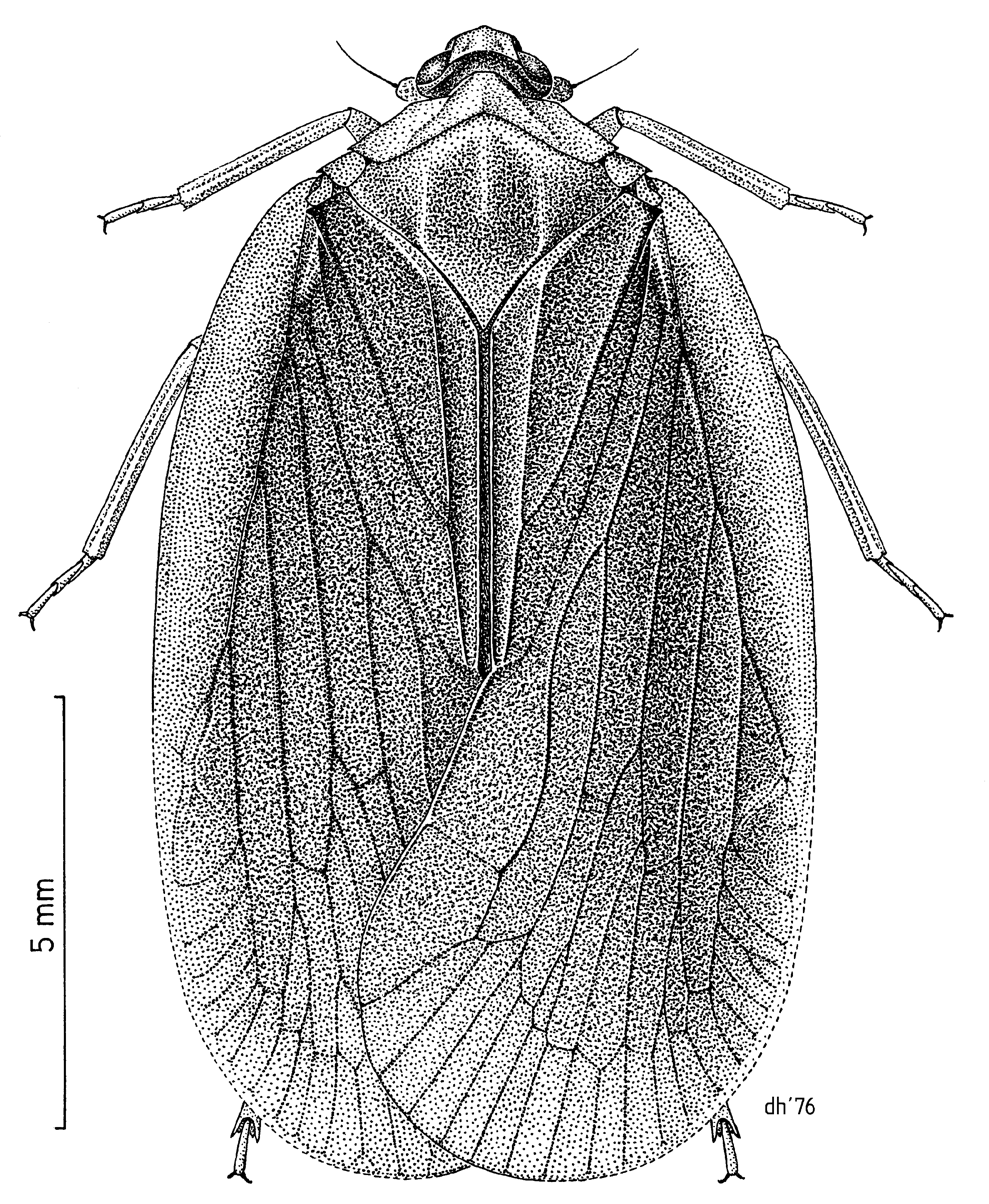
- Achilus flammeus

Scientific classification
- Kingdom: Animalia
- Phylum: Arthropoda
- Clade: Pancrustacea
- Class: Insecta
- Order: Hemiptera
- Suborder: Auchenorrhyncha
- Infraorder: Fulgoromorpha
- Superfamily: Fulgoroidea
- Family: Achilidae; Stål, 1866

= Achilidae =

Achilidae Temporal range: Aptian–Recent

Family of true bugs

Achilidae is a family of planthoppers, sometimes called "achilids", in the order Hemiptera. There are at least 520 described species in Achilidae.

== Subfamilies and genera ==
Fulgoromorpha Lists on the Web (FLOW) includes 3 subfamilies:

=== Achilinae ===
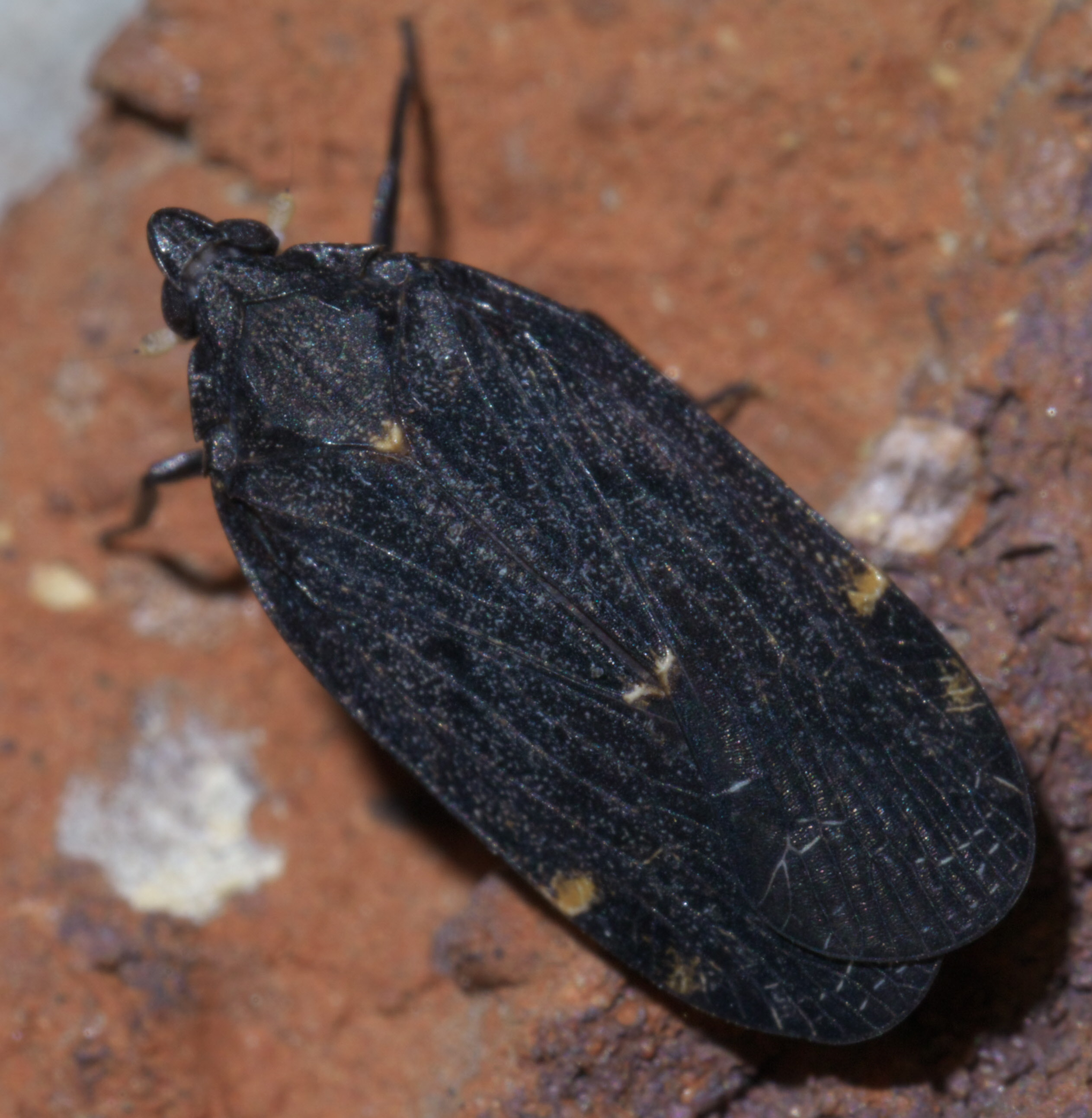
Cixidia opaca

Authority: Stål, 1866 - 2 tribes

Achilini Stål, 1866

- Achilina Stål, 1866
1. Achilus Kirby, 1819 - type genus
2. Flatachilus Fennah, 1950
3. Olmiana Guglielmino, Bückle & Emeljanov, 2010
4. Ouwea Distant, 1907
- Cixidiina Emeljanov, 1992
1. †Angustachilus Lefebvre, Bourgoin & Nel, 2007
2. Cixidia Fieber, 1866
- Elidipterina Fennah, 1950
1. Booneta Distant, 1907
2. Catonidia Uhler, 1896
3. Elidiptera Spinola, 1839
4. Faventilla Metcalf, 1948
5. Messeis Stål, 1860
6. Metaphradmon Fennah, 1950
7. Paracatonidia – P. webbeda Long, Yang & Chen, 2015
8. Paraphradmon Fennah, 1950
9. Parelidiptera Fennah, 1950
10. Phradmonicus Emeljanov, 1991
11. Prinoessa Fennah, 1950
12. Uniptera Ball, 1933
- Achilini incertae sedis
1. Anabunda Emeljanov, 2005
2. Aneipo Kirkaldy, 1906
3. Bunduica Jacobi, 1909
4. Dipsiathus Emeljanov, 2005
5. Epiona Emeljanov, 2005
6. Mabira Fennah, 1950
7. Nelidia Stål, 1860
8. Parabunda Emeljanov, 2005
9. †Paratesum Emeljanov & Shcherbakov, 2009
10. †Protomenocria Emeljanov & Shcherbakov, 2009
11. †Psycheona Emeljanov & Shcherbakov, 2009
12. Rhinochloris Emeljanov, 2005
13. †Gedanochila Brysz & Szwedo, 2022
14. †Protepiptera Usinger, 1939

Achillini Emeljanov, 1991

1. Achilla Haglund, 1899
2. †Hooleya Cockerell, 1922
3. Maurisca Emeljanov, 2005

=== Apatesoninae ===
Authority: Metcalf, 1938 - 4 monotypic tribes

1. Apateson Fowler, 1900: Apatesonini Metcalf, 1938
2. Ilva Stål, 1866: Ilvini Emeljanov, 1991
3. Sevia Stål, 1866: Seviini Emeljanov, 1991
4. Tropiphlepsia Muir, 1924: Tropiphlepsiini Emeljanov, 1991

=== Myconinae ===
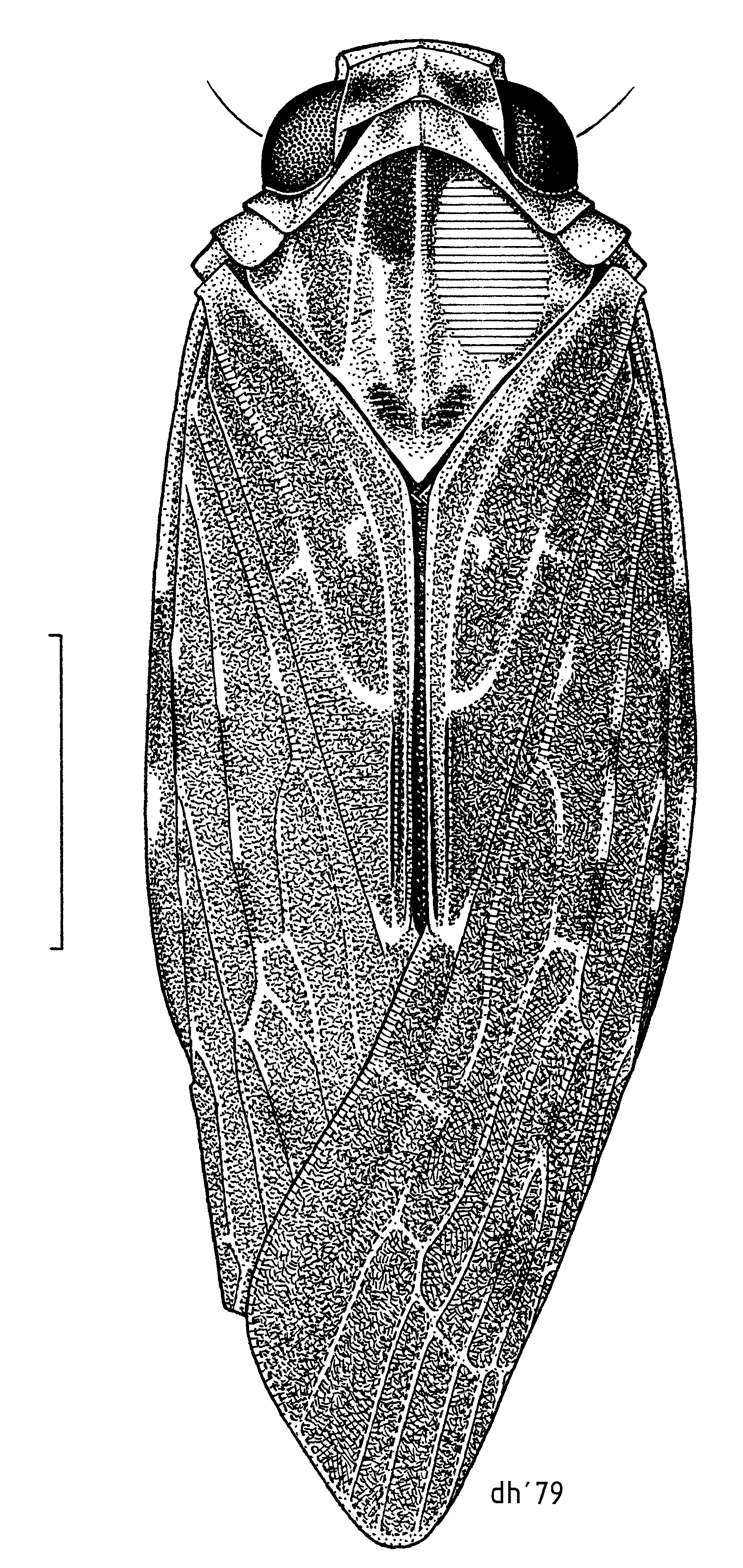
Agandecca annectans male

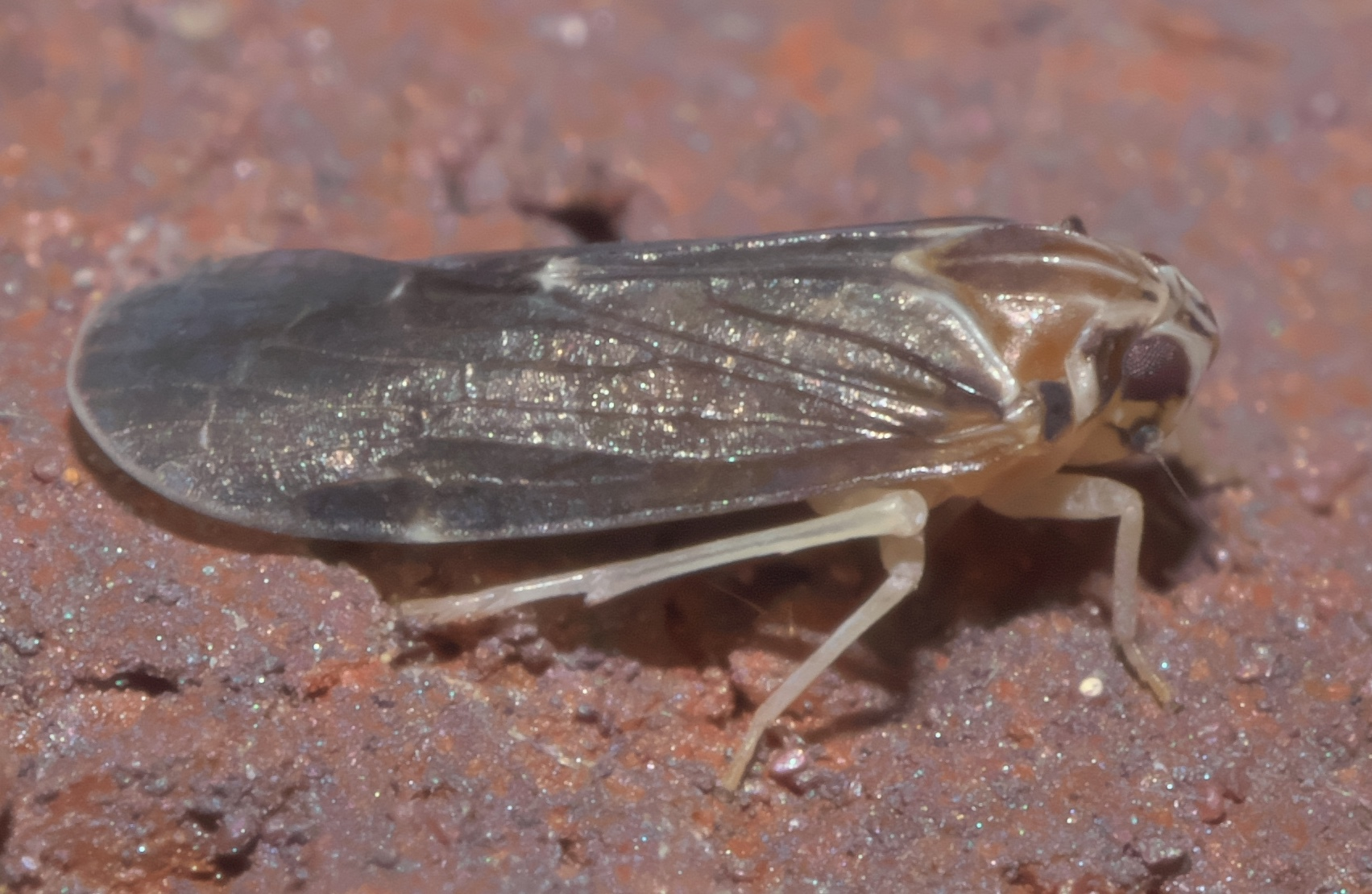
Synecdoche impunctata

Authority: Fennah, 1950 - 6 tribes

Amphignomini Emeljanov, 1991

1. Amphignoma Emeljanov, 1991

Mycarini Emeljanov, 1991

1. Acocarinus Emeljanov, 1991
2. Emeljanocarinus Bourgoin & Soulier-Perkins, 2006
3. Katbergella Fennah, 1950
4. Mycarinus Emeljanov, 1991
5. Mycarus Emeljanov, 1991

Myconini Fennah, 1950

1. Ganachilla – G. zhenyuanensis Wang & Huang, 1989
2. Haicixidia – H. jianfengensis Wang, 1989
3. Myconellus Fennah, 1950
4. Myconus Stål, 1860
5. Myrophenges Fennah, 1965

Plectoderini Fennah, 1950. Selected genera

- Abas Fennah, 1950
- Callichlamys Kirkaldy, 1907
- Cernea Williams, 1977
- Cnidus Stål, 1866
- Cythna Kirkaldy, 1906
- Deferunda Distant, 1912
- Francesca Kirkaldy, 1906
- Gordiacea Metcalf, 1948
- Haitiana Dozier, 1936
- Hamba Distant, 1907
- Kosalya Distant, 1906
- Kurandella Fennah, 1950
- Magadha Distant, 1906
- Mahuna Distant, 1907
- Nyonga Synave, 1959
- Opsiplanon Fennah, 1945
- Plectoderes Spinola, 1839
- Quadrana Caldwell, 1951
- Rhinocolura Fennah, 1950
- Spino Fennah, 1950
- Synecdoche O'Brien, 1971
- Taloka Distant, 1907
- Usana Distant, 1906

Rhotalini Fennah, 1950

1. Errada Walker, 1868
2. Errotasa Emeljanov, 2005
3. Hebrotasa Melichar, 1915
4. Rhotala Walker, 1857
5. Taractellus Metcalf, 1948

Waghildini† Szwedo, 2006

1. Waghilde Szwedo, 2006

=== incertae sedis ===
1. †Acixiites Hamilton, 1990
2. Leptarciella Fennah, 1958
3. †Niryasaburnia Szwedo, 2004
4. Parasabecoides Synave, 1965
5. Peltatavertexalis – P. horizontalis Xu, Long & Chen, 2019
6. Ridesa Schumacher, 1915
7. Sabecoides Fennah, 1958

=== To be placed ===
GBIF also includes the following genera that may have doubtful placement:

1. Chiotasa Melichar, 1915
2. Cionoderus Uhler, 1895
3. Messoides Metcalf, 1930
4. Nablusitypus Kaddumi, 2005
5. Neomenocria Fennah, 1950
6. Okatropis Matsumura, 1910
7. Planusfrons Chun Liang Chen, Chung Tu Yang & Wilson, 1989
8. Plectoderella Fennah, 1950
9. Pyren Fennah, 1950
10. Rhotella Metcalf, 1938
11. Spendon Jacobi, 1928
12. Tabiana Jacobi, 1928
13. Tudea Distant, 1907
14. Winawa Haupt, 1926
