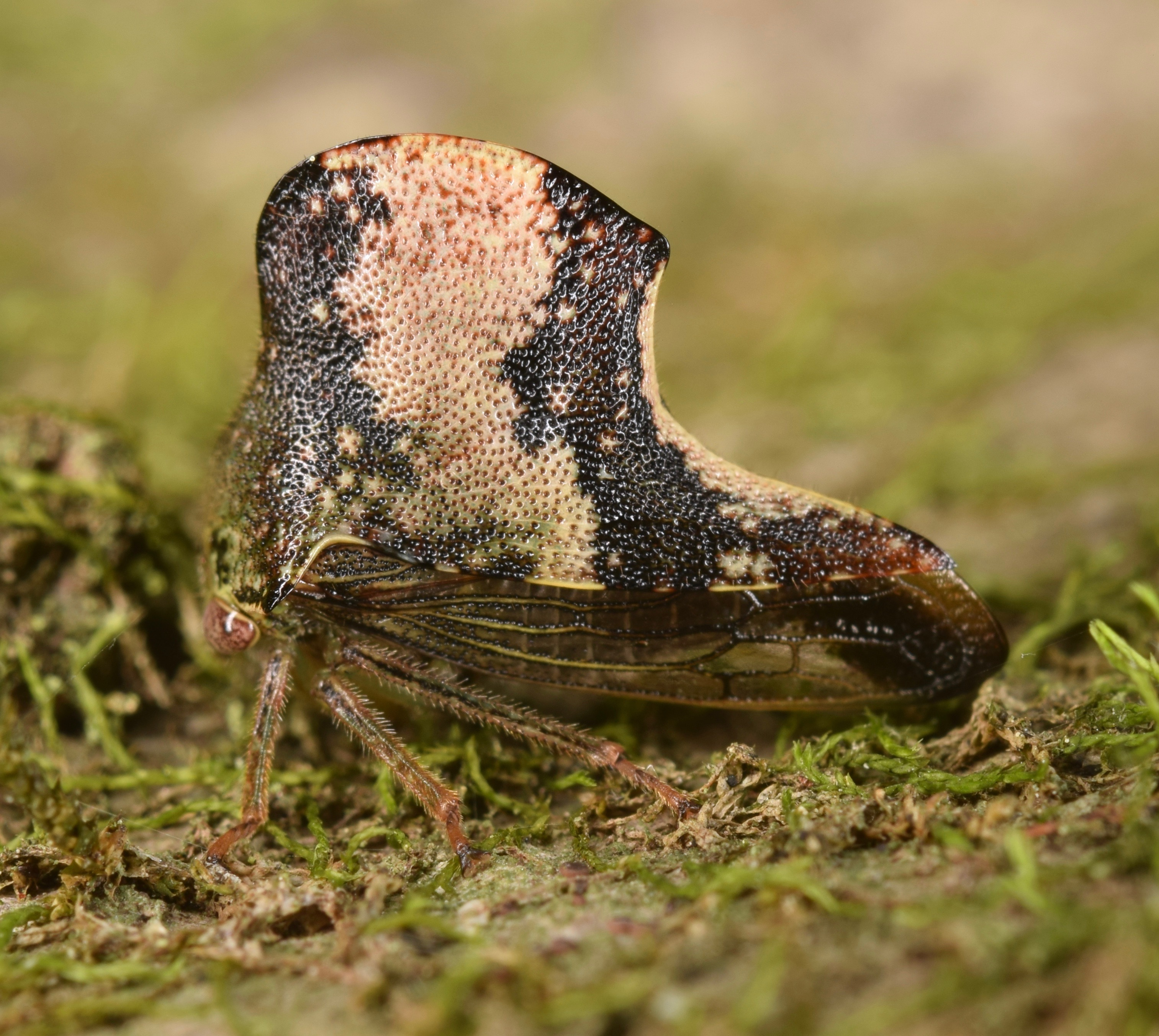

Scientific classification
- Kingdom: Animalia
- Phylum: Arthropoda
- Class: Insecta
- Order: Hemiptera
- Suborder: Auchenorrhyncha
- Family: Membracidae
- Genus: Telamona
- Species: T. maculata

Binomial name
- Telamona maculata Van Duzee

= Telamona maculata =

Species of treehopper

Telamona maculata is a species of treehopper. It belongs to the genus Telamona. It was first described by Edward Payson Van Duzee in 1908.

== Description ==
Like other members of the genus Telamona, T. maculata has a high, almost plateau-shaped pronotum. Its pronotal crest has various brown and beige parts, and its face is pale colored in contrast to the rest of the body. This species can be confused with Telamona tristis.

== Habitat ==
Telamona maculata is found across the eastern portion of North America, but is rarely found in southeastern United States.

== Diet ==
Like all treehoppers, Telamona maculata feeds on the sap coming from the underside of leaves. The following list contains species and genera of trees that T. maculata has been sighted on:

- Carya (hickory)
- Quercus alba (white oak)
- Q. bicolor (swamp white oak)
- Q. macrocarpa (bur oak)
- Q. montana (chestnut oak)
