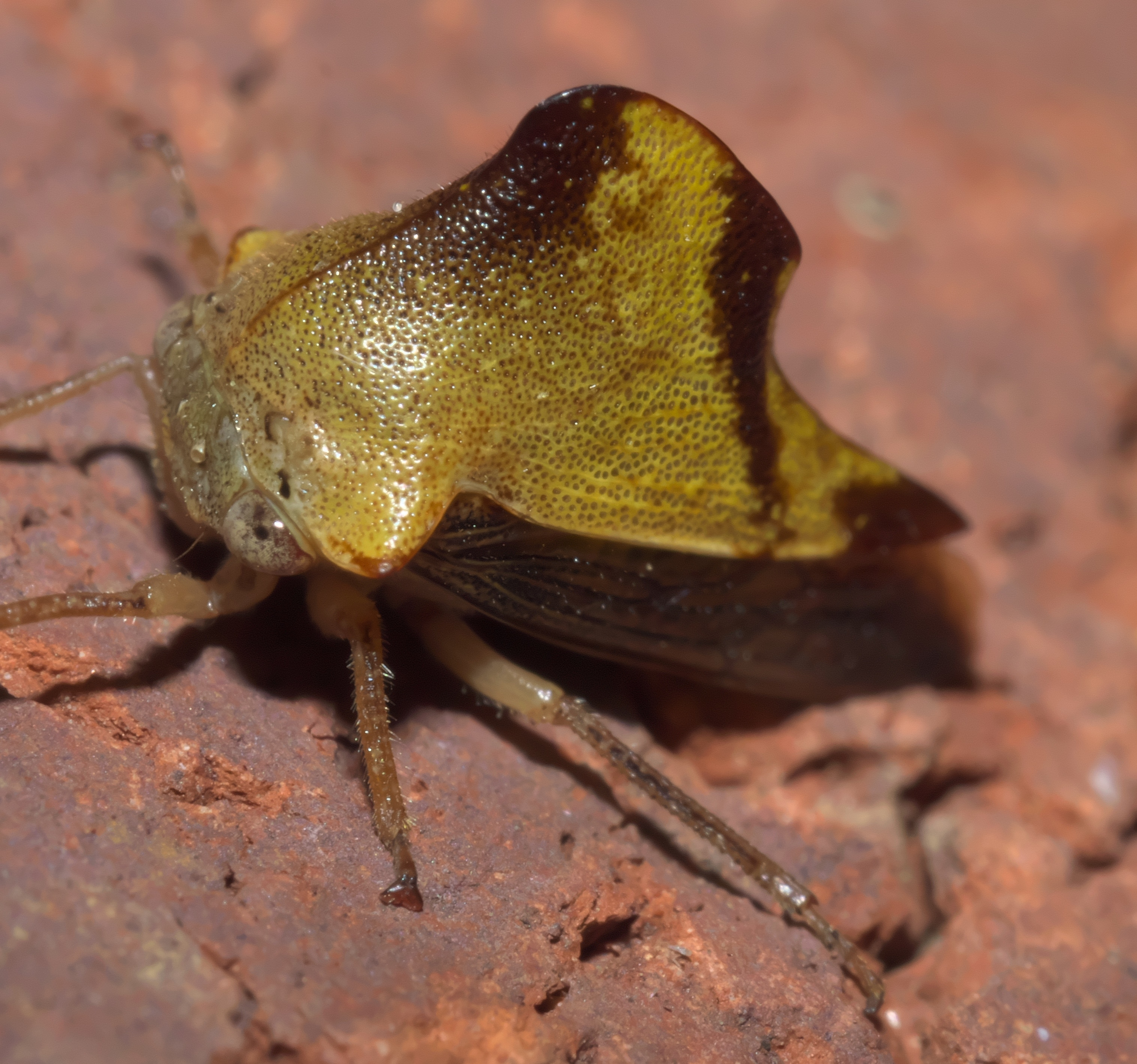
- Telamona excelsa

Scientific classification
- Kingdom: Animalia
- Phylum: Arthropoda
- Class: Insecta
- Order: Hemiptera
- Suborder: Auchenorrhyncha
- Family: Membracidae
- Tribe: Telamonini
- Genus: Telamona; Fitch, 1851

Synonyms
- Helonica Ball, 1931

= Telamona =

Genus of treehoppers

Telamona is a genus of treehoppers in the family Membracidae. There are at least 38 described species in Telamona.

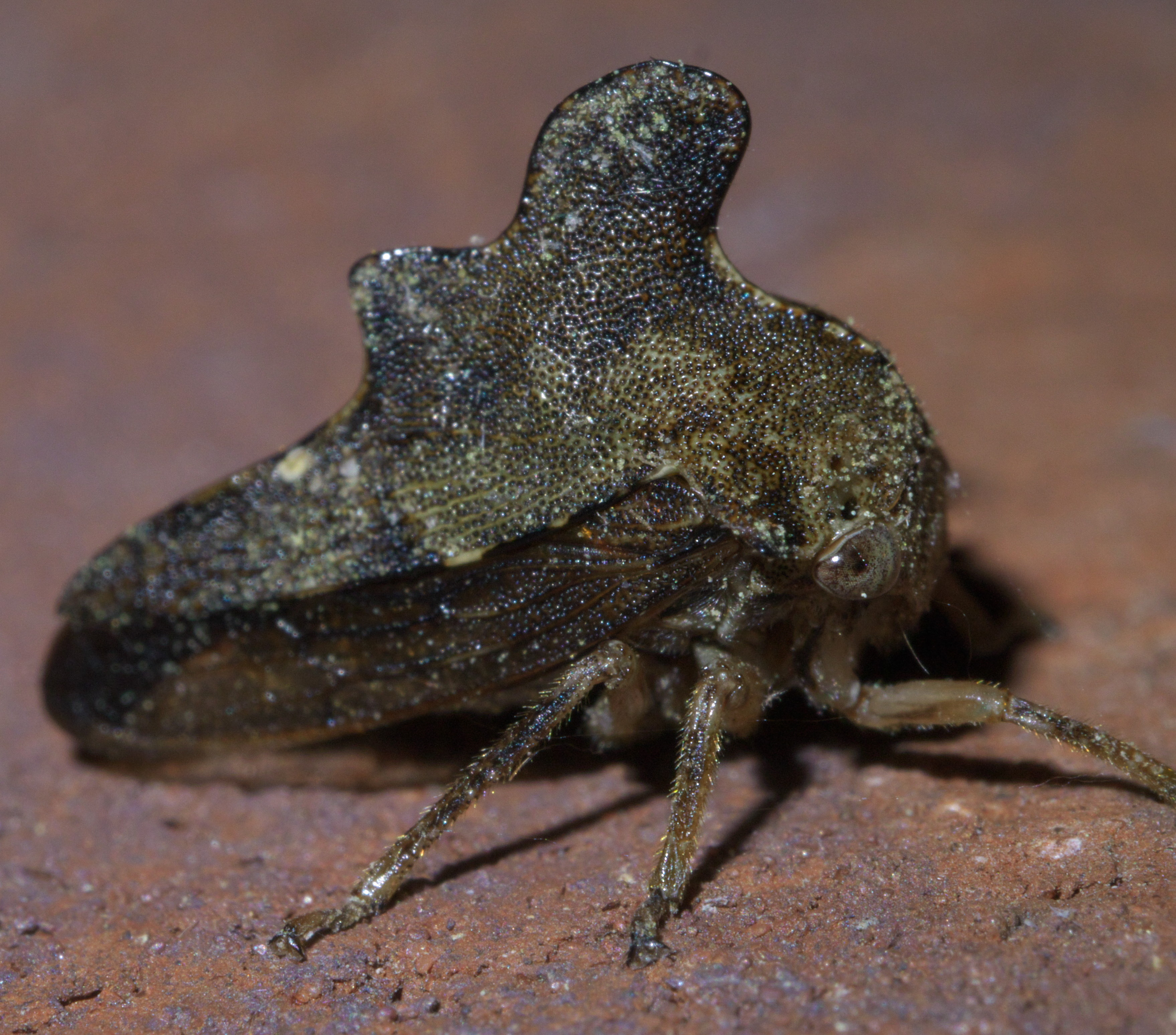
Telamona scalaris

== Species ==
These 38 species belong to the genus Telamona:

- Telamona agrandata Ball^{c g b}
- Telamona ampelopsidis (Harris, 1841)^{c g b} (Virginia creeper treehopper)
- Telamona ampliata^{b}
- Telamona archboldi Froeschner, 1968^{c g b} (Archbold's treehopper)
- Telamona balli Plummer^{c g}
- Telamona barbata Van Duzee^{c g}
- Telamona calva Ball^{c g}
- Telamona celsa Goding^{c g}
- Telamona collina (Walker, 1851)^{c g b}
- Telamona compacta Ball^{c g b}
- Telamona concava Fitch, 1851^{c g b}
- Telamona coronata Ball^{c g}
- Telamona decorata Ball^{c g b}
- Telamona dorana Ball^{c g}
- Telamona dubiosa Van Duzee^{c g b}
- Telamona excelsa Fairmaire^{g b}
- Telamona extrema Ball, 1903^{c g b}
- Telamona gemma^{b}
- Telamona gibbera Ball^{c g}
- Telamona lugubris Ball^{c g}
- Telamona maculata Van Duzee, 1908^{c g b}
- Telamona molaris^{b}
- Telamona monticola Fabricius^{c g b}
- Telamona praealta^{b}
- Telamona projecta Butler^{g b}
- Telamona reclivata Fitch, 1851^{c g b}
- Telamona ruficarinata Fowler^{c g}
- Telamona salvini Fowler, 1896^{c g b}
- Telamona scalaris^{b}
- Telamona spreta Goding, 1893^{c g b}
- Telamona tarda Ball^{c g}
- Telamona tigrina Ball^{b}
- Telamona tiliae Ball, 1925^{c g b} (basswood treehopper)
- Telamona tristis Fitch, 1851^{c g b}
- Telamona unicolor Fitch^{c g}
- Telamona vestita Ball^{c g b}
- Telamona westcotti Goding, 1893^{c g b}
- Telamona woodruffi Ball^{c g}

Data sources: i = ITIS, c = Catalogue of Life, g = GBIF, b = Bugguide.net
