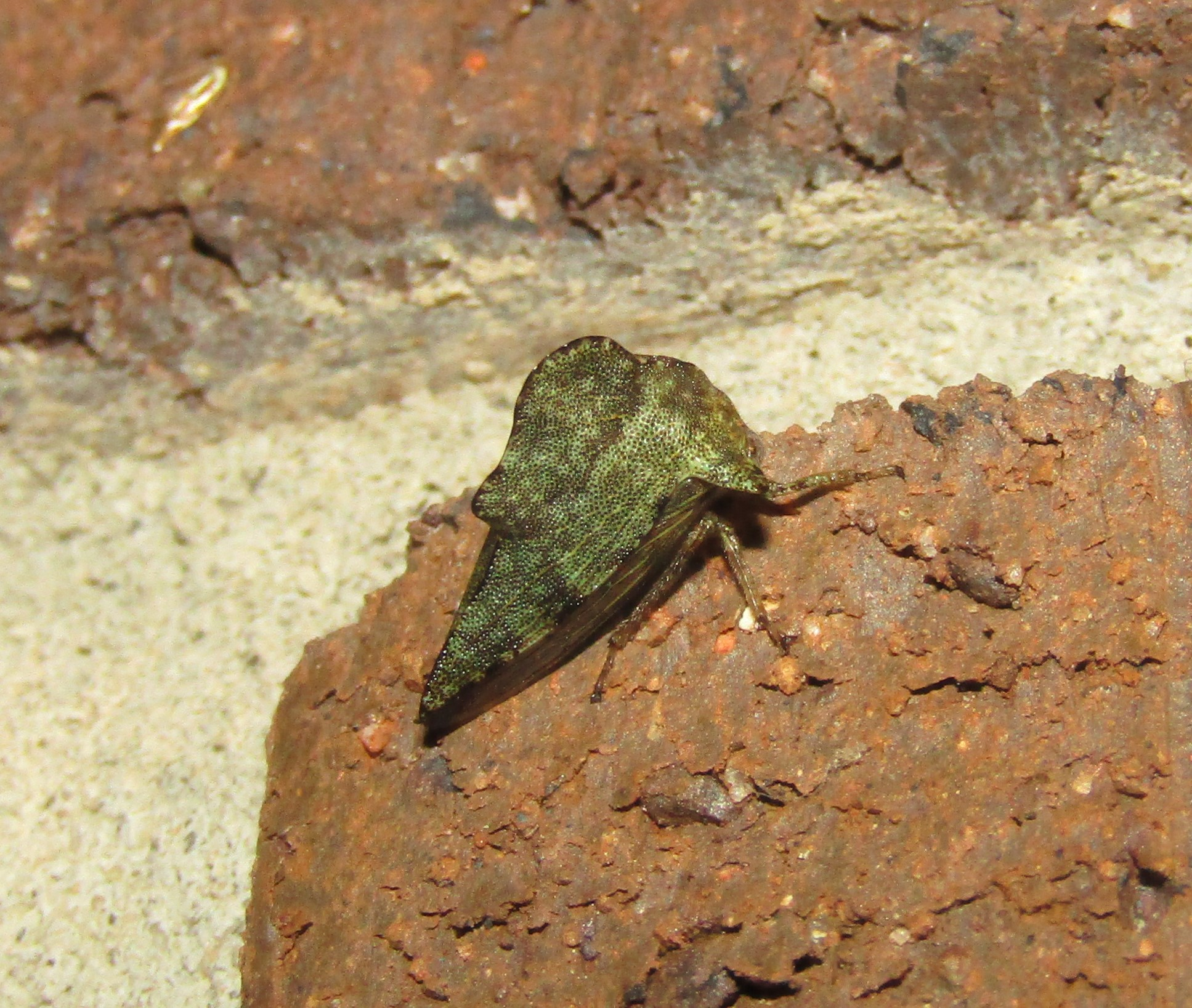
- Heliria cornutula

Scientific classification
- Kingdom: Animalia
- Phylum: Arthropoda
- Clade: Pancrustacea
- Class: Insecta
- Order: Hemiptera
- Suborder: Auchenorrhyncha
- Family: Membracidae
- Tribe: Telamonini
- Genus: Heliria; Stål, 1867

= Heliria =

Genus of true bugs

Heliria is a genus of treehoppers in the family Membracidae.

== Species ==
Thirteen species have been described in the genus Heliria:

- Heliria clitella
- Heliria cornutula
- Heliria cristata
- Heliria fitchi
- Heliria gemma
- Heliria gibberata
- Heliria mexicana
- Heliria molaris
- Heliria praealta
- Heliria scalaris
- Heliria sinuata
- Heliria strombergi
- Heliria turritella
