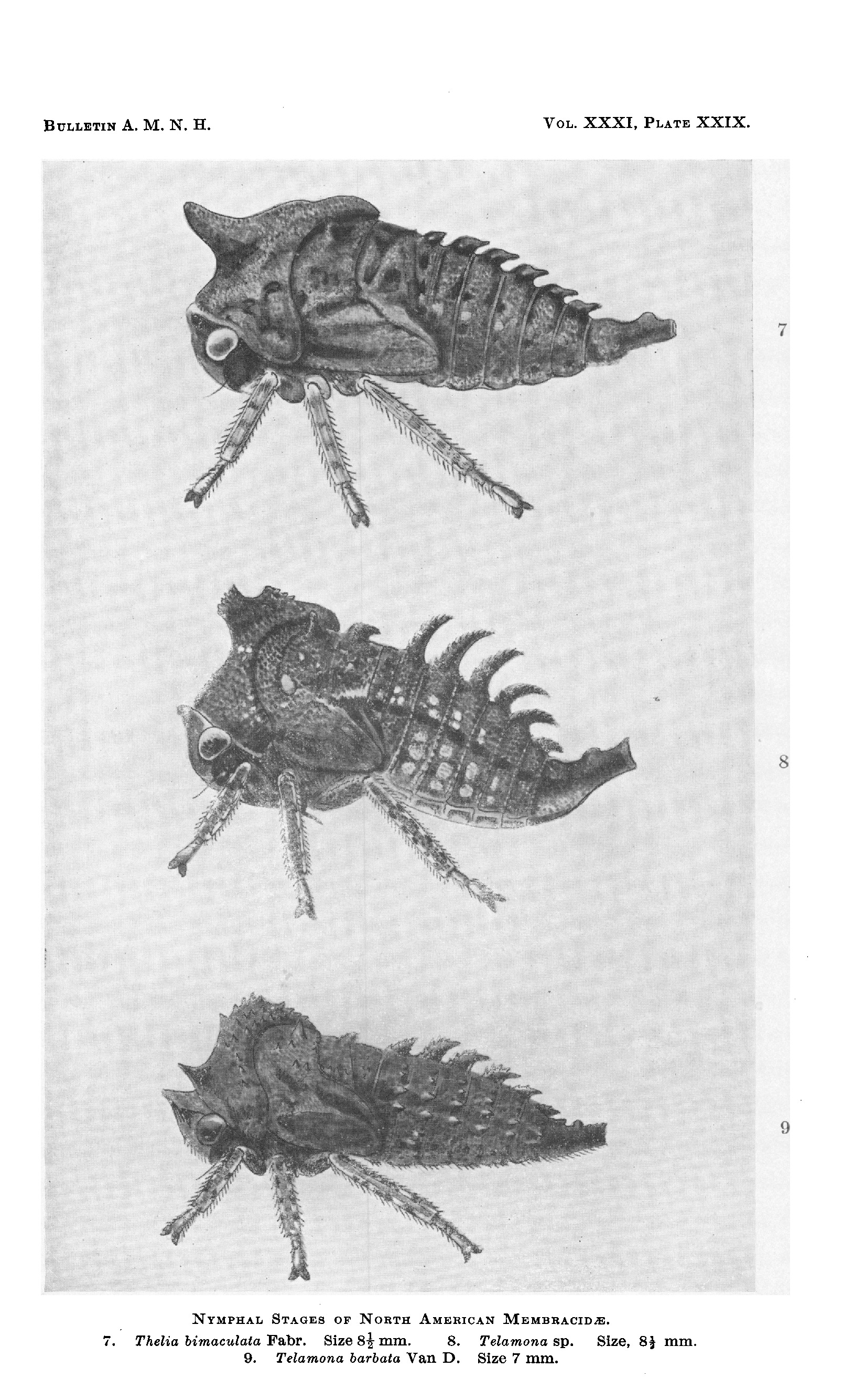

Scientific classification
- Kingdom: Animalia
- Phylum: Arthropoda
- Clade: Pancrustacea
- Class: Insecta
- Order: Hemiptera
- Suborder: Auchenorrhyncha
- Family: Membracidae
- Genus: Telamona
- Species: T. barbata

Binomial name
- Telamona barbata Van Duzee, 1908

Synonyms
- Palonica pyramidata var. ampliata Ball, 1931; Telamona ampliata (Ball, 1931)

= Telamona barbata =

Species of insect

Telamona barbata is a species of treehopper in the family Membracidae.
