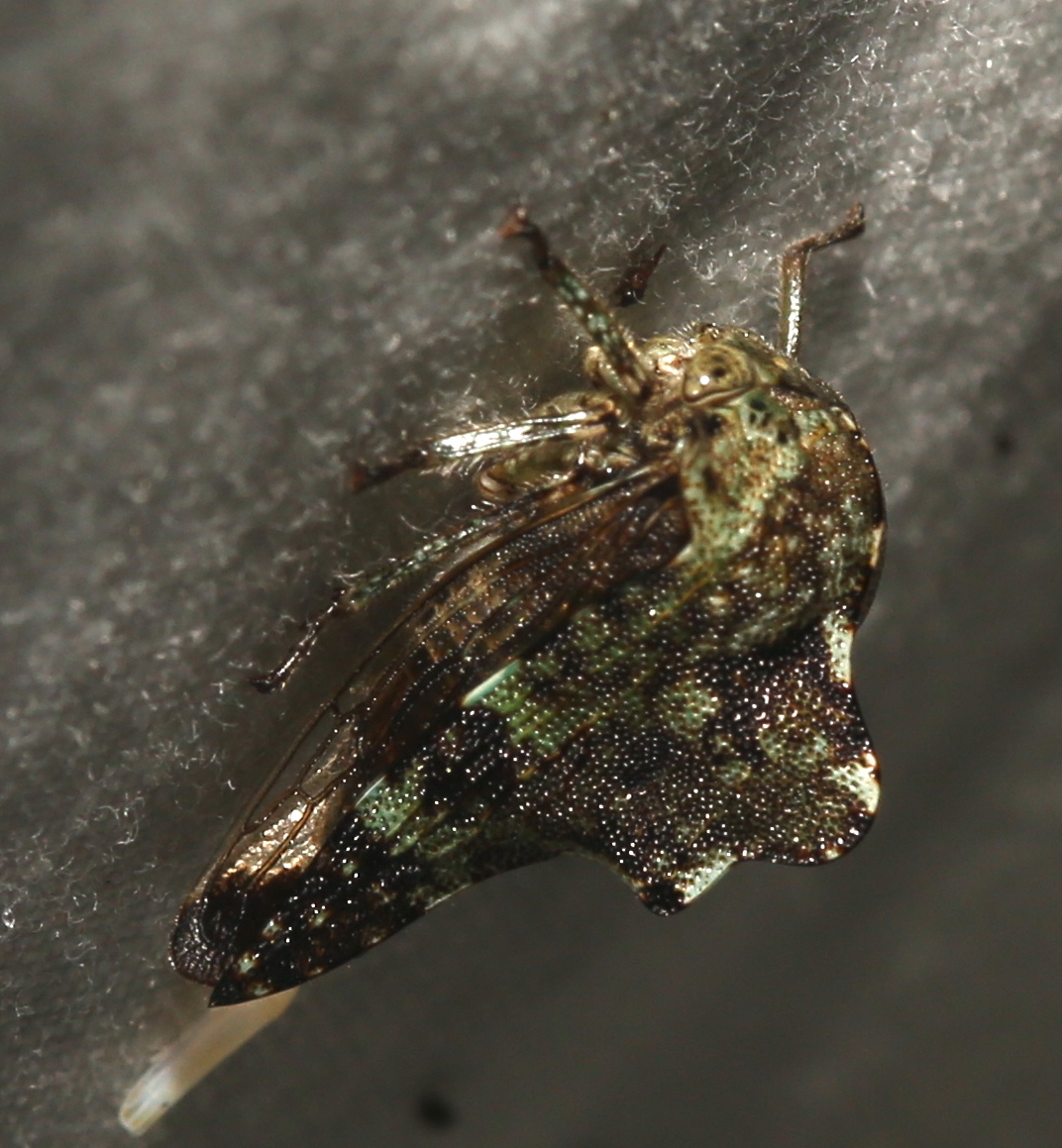

Scientific classification
- Kingdom: Animalia
- Phylum: Arthropoda
- Class: Insecta
- Order: Hemiptera
- Suborder: Auchenorrhyncha
- Family: Membracidae
- Genus: Heliria
- Species: H. fitchi

Binomial name
- Heliria fitchi Ball, 1925

= Heliria fitchi =

Species of treehopper

Heliria fitchi is a species of treehopper belonging to the genus Heliria. It was first described by Elmer Darwin Ball in 1925.

== Habitat ==
Heliria fitchi is found in eastern United States and has also been found in Ontario, Canada. It feeds on the white oak (Quercus alba).
