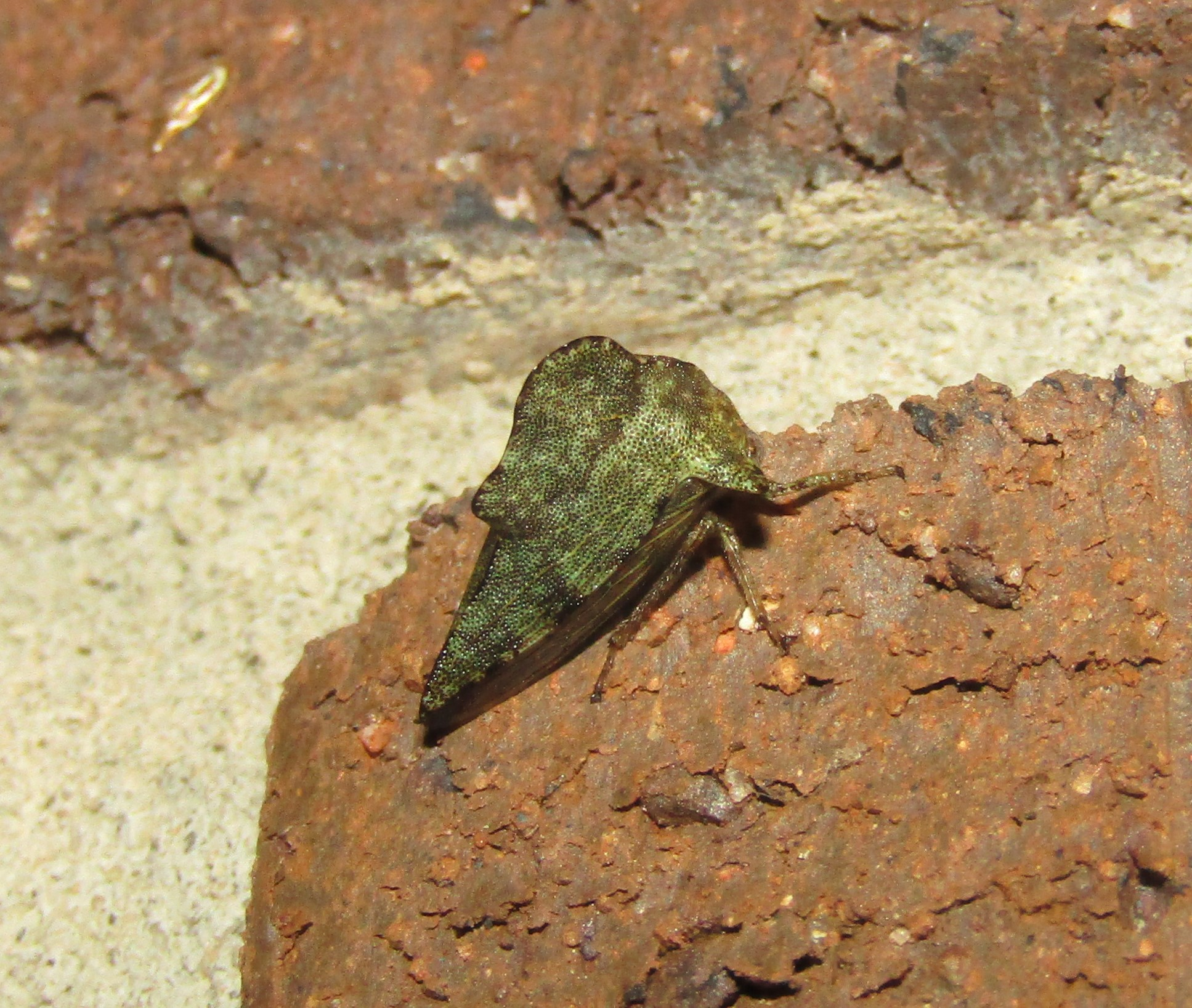

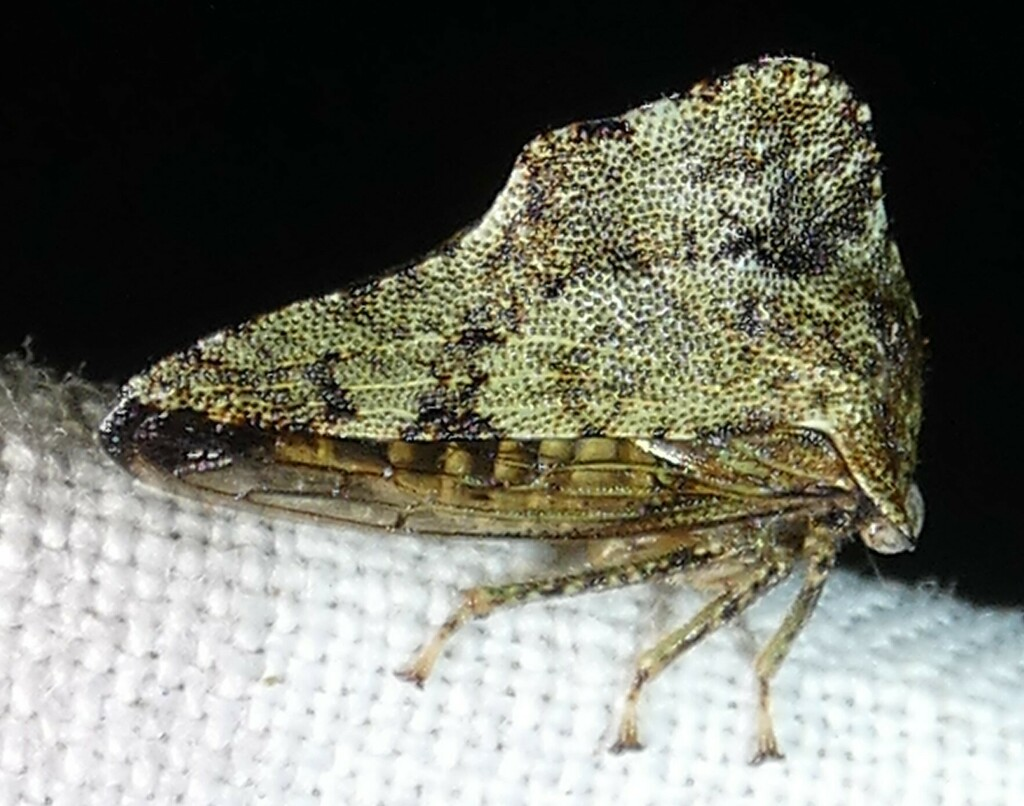

Scientific classification
- Domain: Eukaryota
- Kingdom: Animalia
- Phylum: Arthropoda
- Class: Insecta
- Order: Hemiptera
- Suborder: Auchenorrhyncha
- Family: Membracidae
- Genus: Heliria
- Species: H. cornutula

Binomial name
- Heliria cornutula Ball, 1925

= Heliria cornutula =

Species of insect

Heliria cornutula is a species of treehopper which belongs to the genus Heliria. It was first described by Elmer Darwin Ball in 1925.

== Diet ==
Heliria cornutula exclusively feeds on the sweetgum (Liquidambar styraciflua).
