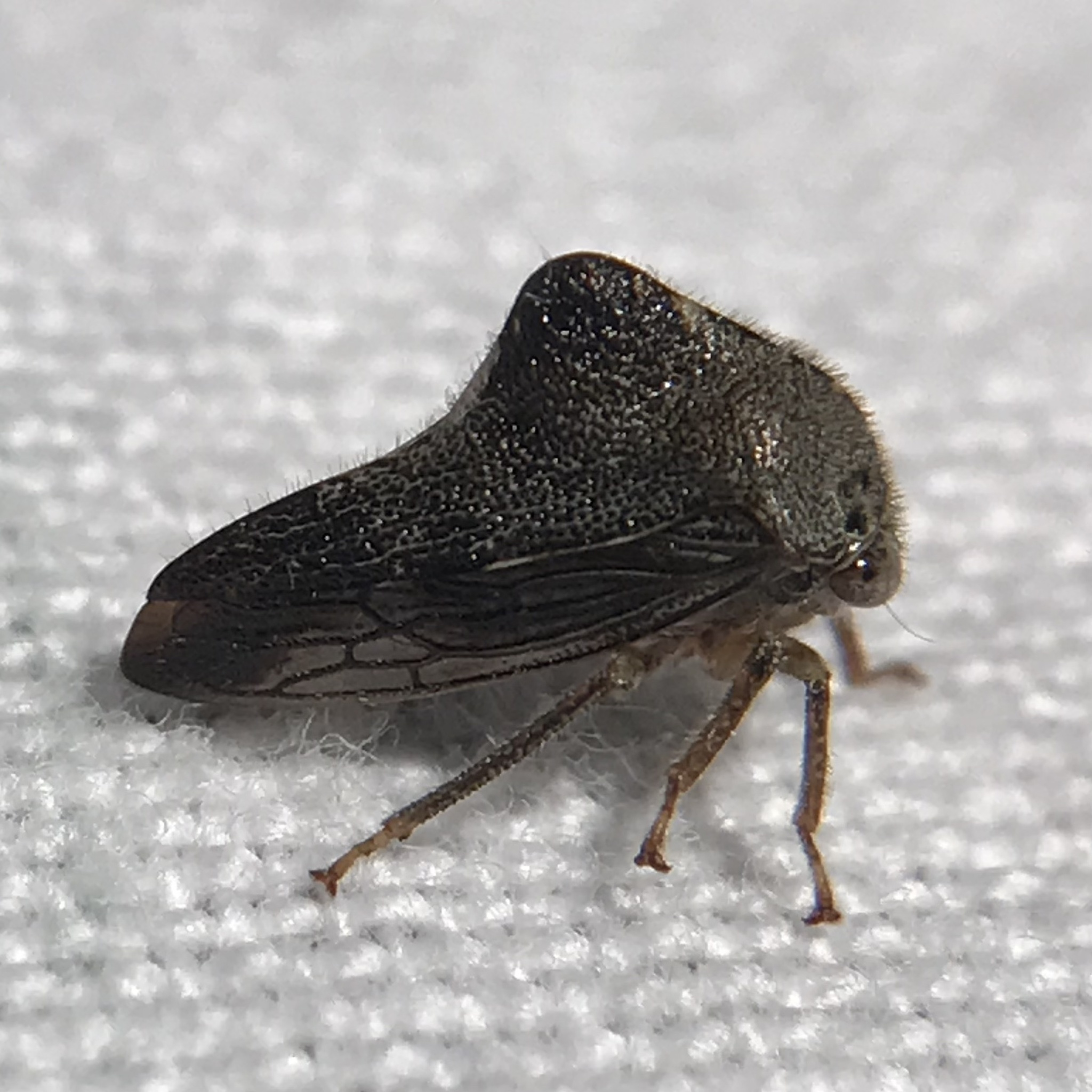

Scientific classification
- Kingdom: Animalia
- Phylum: Arthropoda
- Class: Insecta
- Order: Hemiptera
- Suborder: Auchenorrhyncha
- Family: Membracidae
- Genus: Telamona
- Species: T. tarda

Binomial name
- Telamona tarda Ball, 1925

= Telamona tarda =

Species of treehopper

Telamona tarda is a species of treehopper. It belongs to the genus Telamona.

== Appearance ==
T. tarda has a greenish-brown pronotum and a low, almost horn-shaped pronotal crest, which is unlike other members of Telamona. The pronotal crest is usually darker than the rest of the pronotum. Adults range from 9-10 millimetres.
