= Neomegamelanus elongatus =

Scientific classification
- Domain: Eukaryota
- Kingdom: Animalia
- Phylum: Arthropoda
- Class: Insecta
- Order: Hemiptera
- Suborder: Auchenorrhyncha
- Infraorder: Fulgoromorpha
- Family: Delphacidae
- Genus: Neomegamelanus
- Species: N. elongatus

Binomial name
- Neomegamelanus elongatus (Ball, 1905)

Species of true bug

Neomegamelanus elongatus is a species of delphacid planthopper in the family Delphacidae. It is found in the Caribbean and North America.

== Subspecies ==
Two subspecies belong to the species Neomegamelanus elongatus:

- Neomegamelanus elongatus elongatus (Ball, 1905)^{i g}
- Neomegamelanus elongatus reductus (Caldwell in Caldwell and Martorell, 1951)^{i c g}

Data sources: i = ITIS, c = Catalogue of Life, g = GBIF, b = Bugguide.net
