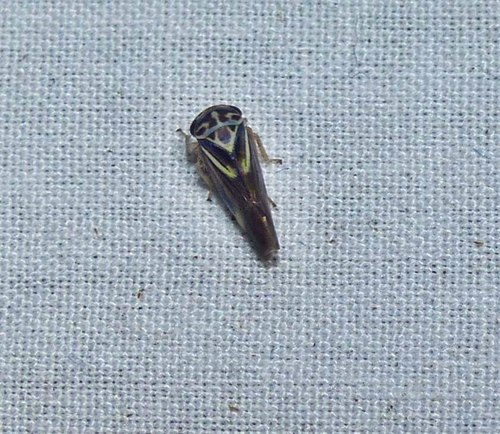

Scientific classification
- Domain: Eukaryota
- Kingdom: Animalia
- Phylum: Arthropoda
- Class: Insecta
- Order: Hemiptera
- Suborder: Auchenorrhyncha
- Family: Cicadellidae
- Genus: Balcanocerus
- Species: B. fitchi

Binomial name
- Balcanocerus fitchi (Van Duzee, 1909)

= Balcanocerus fitchi =

Species of insect

Balcanocerus fitchi is a species of typical leafhoppers.

== Description ==
Balcanocerus fitchi has white and black on the costa, or edge, of the wing, and white lines hooking inwards from the connection of the wings. The top of the head, or the vertex, is yellow with two large black spots. The thorax is orange, yellow, or brown with large spots of yellow-brown and dark brown spots along the anterior margin. In some specimens there is a yellow midline. They are 5.4–6.2 mm (0.21–0.24 in) long.

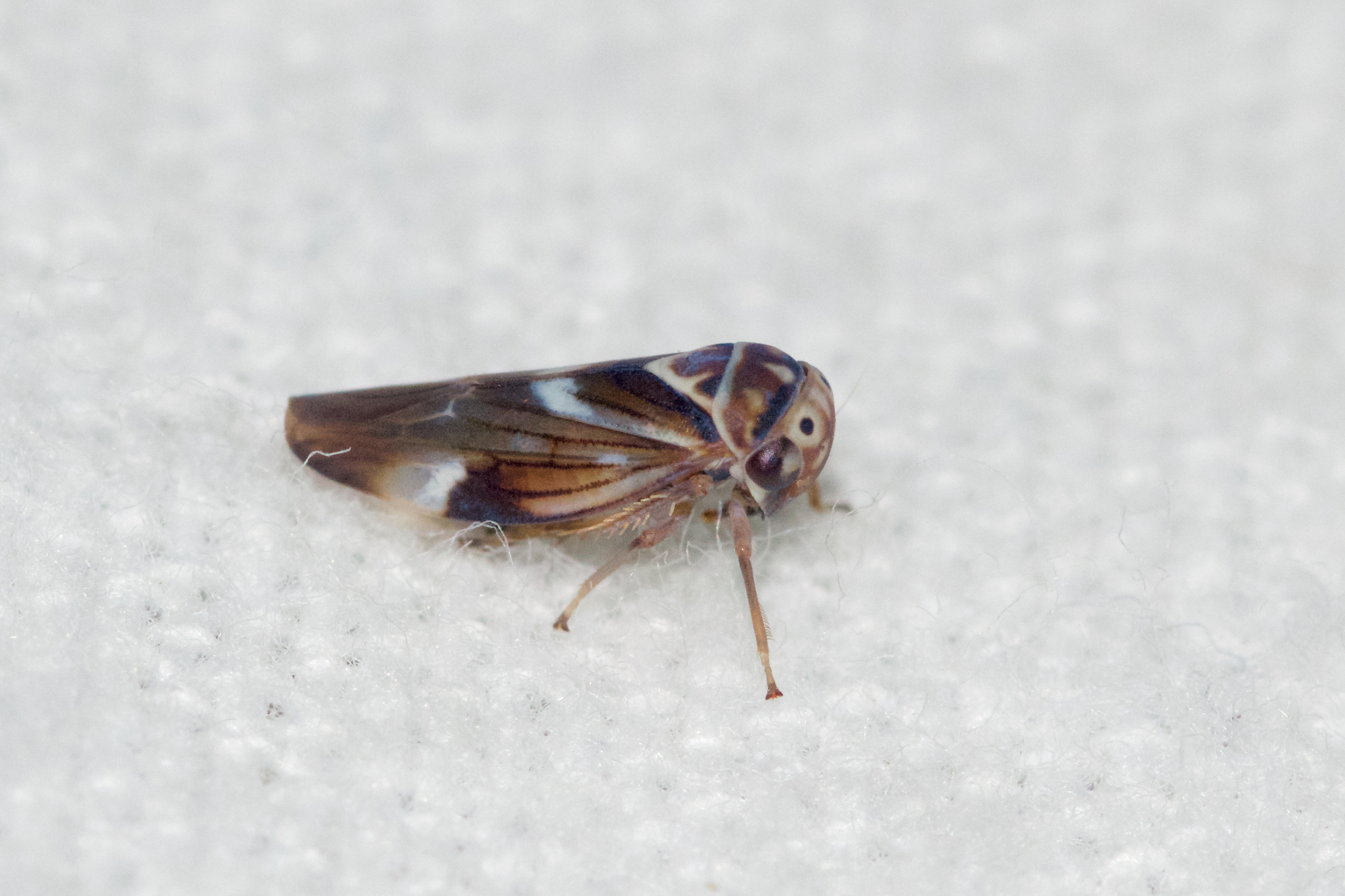
Balcanocerus fitchi

== Range & habitat ==
Balcanocerus fitchi is often found in open forest in the north eastern parts of the United States, and south eastern parts of Canada.

== Diet ==
Balcanocerus fitchi will mostly eat from hawthorn and crab apple trees.

== Sexual dimorphism ==
In males, the subgenital plates of Balcanocerus fitchi are long, narrow and rounded at the apex. The female pregenital plate has an evenly produced posterior margin, without a median notch. Adult males are 5.4–5.8 mm (0.21–0.23 in) long while females are longer at 5.7–6.2 mm (0.22–0.24 in).
