= Telamona gibbera =

Scientific classification
- Kingdom: Animalia
- Phylum: Arthropoda
- Class: Insecta
- Order: Hemiptera
- Suborder: Auchenorrhyncha
- Family: Membracidae
- Genus: Telamona
- Species: T. gibbera

Binomial name
- Telamona gibbera Ball, 1925

Species of treehopper

Telamona gibbera is a species of treehopper. It belongs to the genus Telamona.
