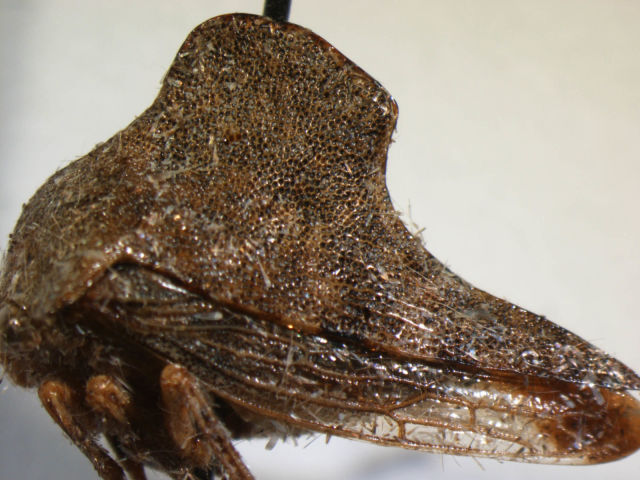

Scientific classification
- Kingdom: Animalia
- Phylum: Arthropoda
- Class: Insecta
- Order: Hemiptera
- Suborder: Auchenorrhyncha
- Family: Membracidae
- Genus: Telamona
- Species: T. agrandata

Binomial name
- Telamona agrandata (Ball, 1931)

= Telamona agrandata =

Species of treehopper

Telamona agrandata is a species of treehopper in the genus Telamona.

== Distribution ==
Telamona agrandata is found in the central and eastern United States.
