= Heliria gibberata =

Scientific classification
- Kingdom: Animalia
- Phylum: Arthropoda
- Class: Insecta
- Order: Hemiptera
- Suborder: Auchenorrhyncha
- Family: Membracidae
- Genus: Heliria
- Species: H. gibberata

Binomial name
- Heliria gibberata Ball, 1925

Species of treehopper

Heliria gibberata is a species of treehopper. It belongs to the genus Heliria. It is associated with the hackberry. It is found in the United States.
