= Muirodelphax parvulus =

Scientific classification
- Domain: Eukaryota
- Kingdom: Animalia
- Phylum: Arthropoda
- Class: Insecta
- Order: Hemiptera
- Suborder: Auchenorrhyncha
- Infraorder: Fulgoromorpha
- Family: Delphacidae
- Genus: Muirodelphax
- Species: M. parvulus

Binomial name
- Muirodelphax parvulus (Ball, 1902)

Species of true bug

Muirodelphax parvulus is a species of delphacid planthopper in the family Delphacidae. It is found in North America.
