= Telamona dubiosa =

Scientific classification
- Kingdom: Animalia
- Phylum: Arthropoda
- Class: Insecta
- Order: Hemiptera
- Suborder: Auchenorrhyncha
- Family: Membracidae
- Genus: Telamona
- Species: T. dubiosa

Binomial name
- Telamona dubiosa Van Duzee

"species of treehopper"

Telamona dubiosa is a species of treehopper in the family Membracidae. White oak is the only known host plant for the species.
