= Telamona coronata =

Scientific classification
- Kingdom: Animalia
- Phylum: Arthropoda
- Class: Insecta
- Order: Hemiptera
- Suborder: Auchenorrhyncha
- Family: Membracidae
- Genus: Telamona
- Species: T. coronata

Binomial name
- Telamona coronata Ball

Species of treehopper

Telamona coronata is a species of treehopper. It belongs to the genus Telamona.
