= Telamona celsa =

Scientific classification
- Kingdom: Animalia
- Phylum: Arthropoda
- Class: Insecta
- Order: Hemiptera
- Suborder: Auchenorrhyncha
- Family: Membracidae
- Genus: Telamona
- Species: T. celsa

Binomial name
- Telamona celsa Goding, 1930

Species of treehopper

Telamona celsa is a species of treehopper. It belongs to the genus Telamona.
