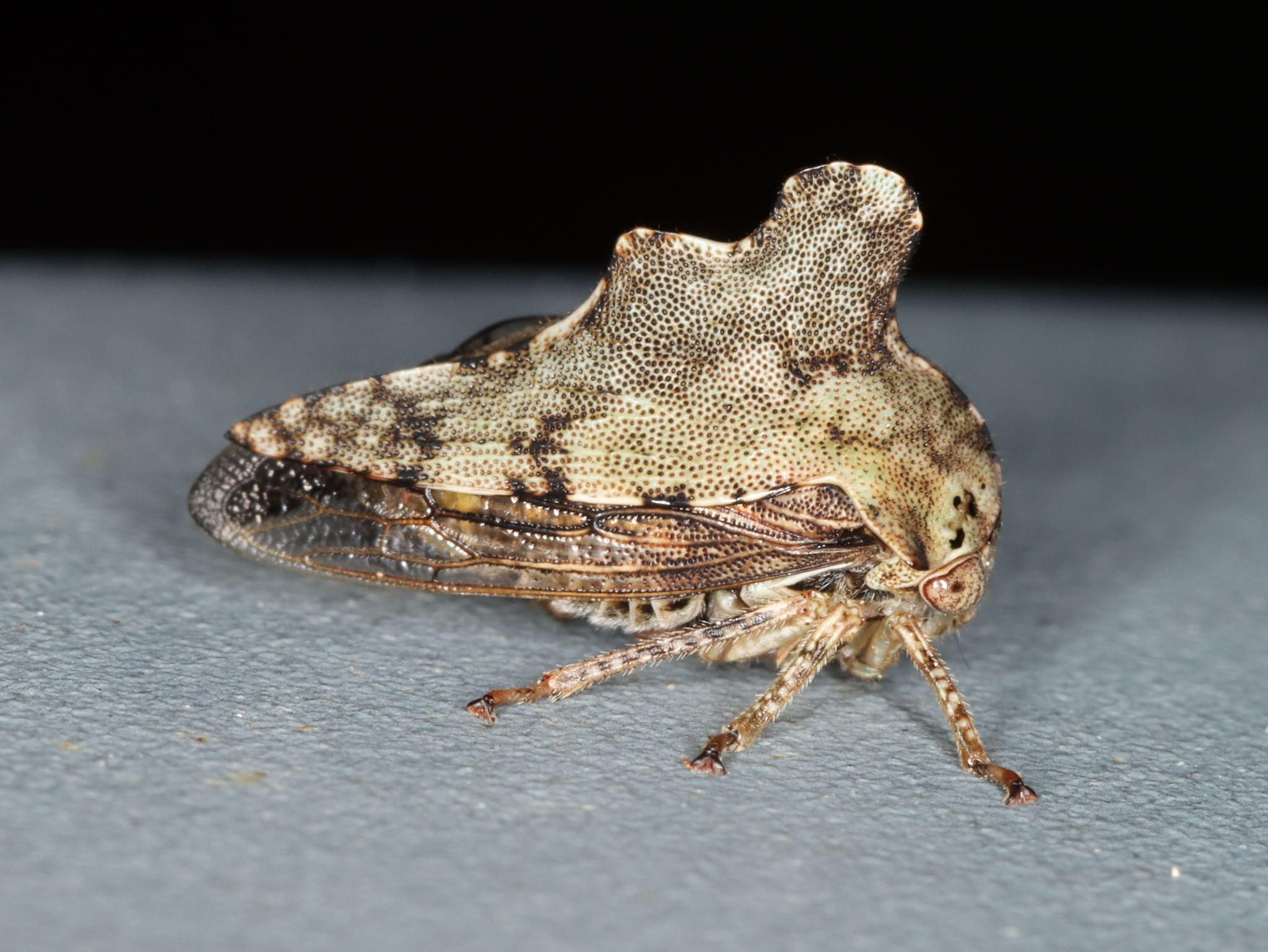
- Heliria cristata, Massachusetts

Scientific classification
- Kingdom: Animalia
- Phylum: Arthropoda
- Class: Insecta
- Order: Hemiptera
- Suborder: Auchenorrhyncha
- Family: Membracidae
- Genus: Heliria
- Species: H. cristata

Binomial name
- Heliria cristata Fairmaire, 1846

= Heliria cristata =

Species of treehopper

Heliria cristata is a species of treehopper belonging to the genus Heliria. It was first described by Léon Fairmaire in 1846.

== Habitat ==
Heliria cristata is found in the eastern United States, but its range can reach as far as Texas to Ontario, Canada. It feeds primarily on the black oak (Quercus velutina) but it has been spotted feeding on other kinds of oak.
