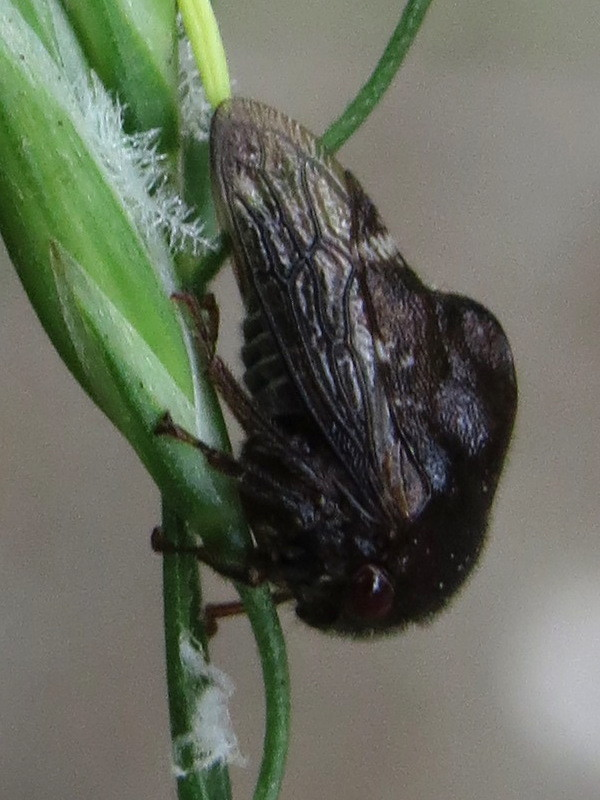

Scientific classification
- Kingdom: Animalia
- Phylum: Arthropoda
- Class: Insecta
- Order: Hemiptera
- Suborder: Auchenorrhyncha
- Family: Membracidae
- Genus: Telamona
- Species: T. compacta

Binomial name
- Telamona compacta Ball, 1903

= Telamona compacta =

Species of treehopper

Telamona compacta is a species of treehopper in the family Membracidae.
