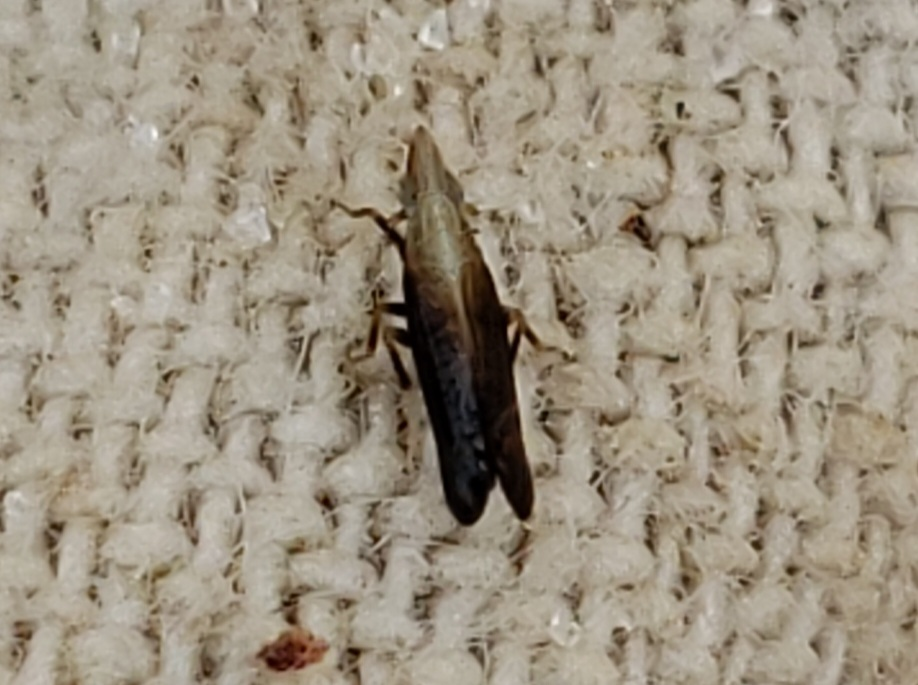

Scientific classification
- Kingdom: Animalia
- Phylum: Arthropoda
- Class: Insecta
- Order: Hemiptera
- Suborder: Auchenorrhyncha
- Infraorder: Fulgoromorpha
- Family: Delphacidae
- Genus: Neomegamelanus
- Species: N. spartini

Binomial name
- Neomegamelanus spartini (Osborn, 1905)

Synonyms
- Neomegamelanus dorsalis (Metcalf, 1923)

= Neomegamelanus spartini =

Species of true bug

Neomegamelanus spartini is a species of delphacid planthopper in the family Delphacidae. It is found in North America.
