= Bostaera =

Scientific classification
- Domain: Eukaryota
- Kingdom: Animalia
- Phylum: Arthropoda
- Class: Insecta
- Order: Hemiptera
- Suborder: Auchenorrhyncha
- Infraorder: Fulgoromorpha
- Family: Delphacidae
- Tribe: Delphacini
- Genus: Bostaera; Ball, 1902

Genus of true bugs

Bostaera is a genus of delphacid planthoppers in the family Delphacidae. There are about five described species in Bostaera.

== Species ==
These five species belong to the genus Bostaera:

- Bostaera balli Penner, 1952
- Bostaera bolivari (Melichar, 1901)
- Bostaera frontalis Lindberg, 1958
- Bostaera gomerense Carl, 1995
- Bostaera nasuta Ball, 1902
