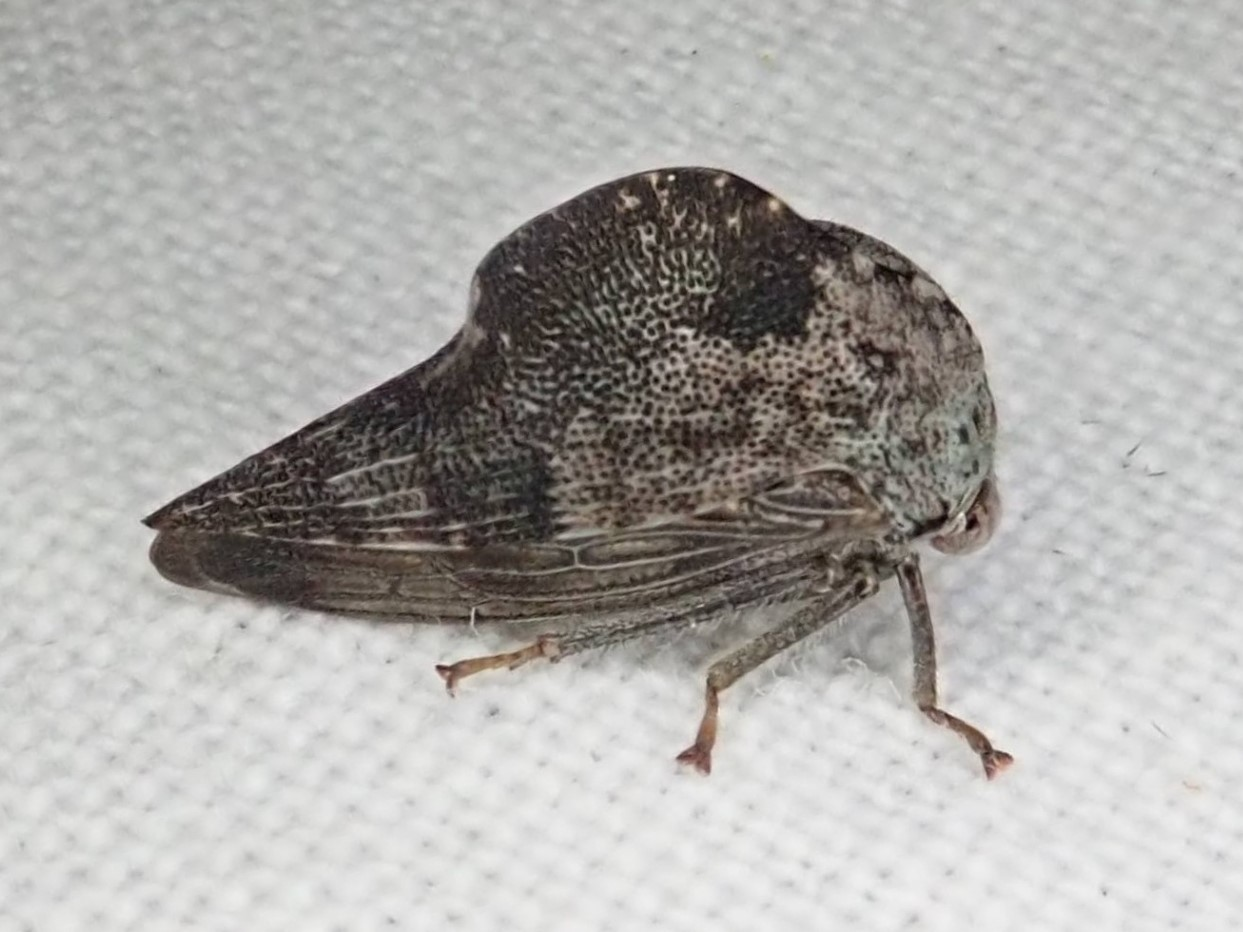

Scientific classification
- Kingdom: Animalia
- Phylum: Arthropoda
- Class: Insecta
- Order: Hemiptera
- Suborder: Auchenorrhyncha
- Family: Membracidae
- Genus: Telamona
- Species: T. reclivata

Binomial name
- Telamona reclivata Fitch, 1851

= Telamona reclivata =

Species of insect

Telamona reclivata is a species of treehopper in the family Membracidae.
