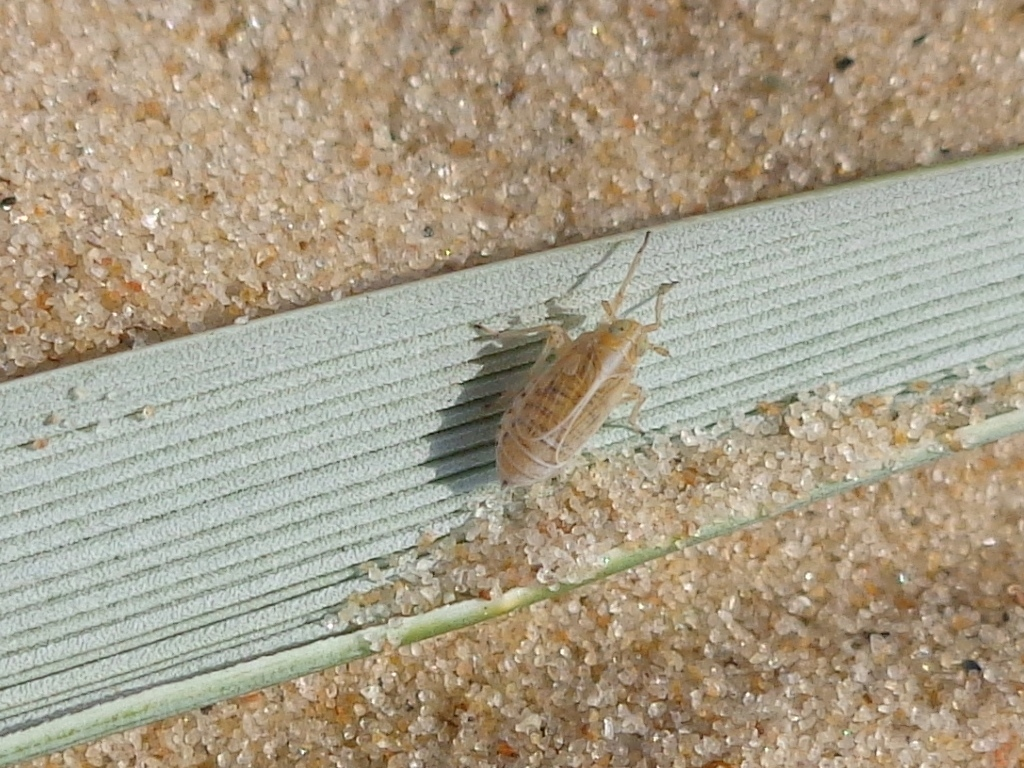
- Muirodelphax aubei

Scientific classification
- Domain: Eukaryota
- Kingdom: Animalia
- Phylum: Arthropoda
- Class: Insecta
- Order: Hemiptera
- Suborder: Auchenorrhyncha
- Infraorder: Fulgoromorpha
- Family: Delphacidae
- Tribe: Delphacini
- Genus: Muirodelphax; Wagner, 1963

Synonyms
- Delphacinoides Vilbaste, 1965; Pinodoxa Anufriev, 1991

= Muirodelphax =

Genus of true bugs

Muirodelphax is a genus of delphacid planthoppers in the family Delphacidae. There are about 13 described species in Muirodelphax.

== Species ==
These 13 species belong to the genus Muirodelphax:

- Muirodelphax altaica (Vilbaste, 1965)
- Muirodelphax amol Dlabola, 1981
- Muirodelphax arvensis (Fitch, 1851)
- Muirodelphax atralabis (Beamer, 1948)
- Muirodelphax atratulus Vilbaste, 1968
- Muirodelphax aubei (Perris, 1857)
- Muirodelphax litoralis Vilbaste, 1968
- Muirodelphax luteus (Beamer, 1946)
- Muirodelphax nigrostriata (Kusnezov, 1929)
- Muirodelphax parvulus (Ball, 1902)
- Muirodelphax peneluteus (Beamer, 1948)
- Muirodelphax pinanorum (Anufriev, 1991)
- Muirodelphax unda (Metcalf, 1923)
