= Telamona archboldi =

Scientific classification
- Kingdom: Animalia
- Phylum: Arthropoda
- Class: Insecta
- Order: Hemiptera
- Suborder: Auchenorrhyncha
- Family: Membracidae
- Genus: Telamona
- Species: T. archboldi

Binomial name
- Telamona archboldi Froeschner, 1968

Species of treehopper

Telamona archboldi, also known as Archbold's treehopper, is a species of treehopper belonging to the genus Telamona. It was first described by Richard Froeschner in 1968.
