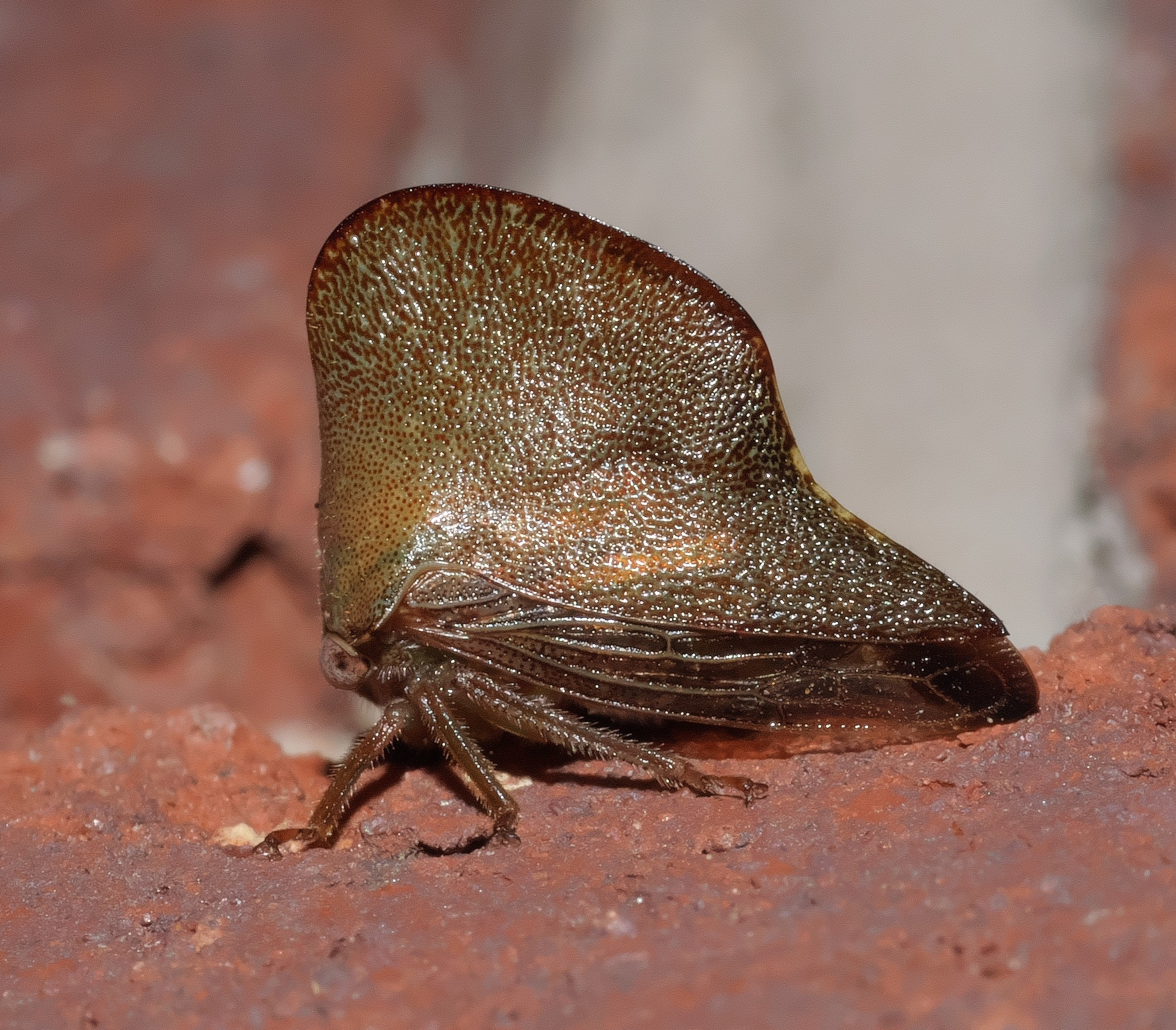
- Telamona extrema, Oklahoma

Scientific classification
- Kingdom: Animalia
- Phylum: Arthropoda
- Class: Insecta
- Order: Hemiptera
- Suborder: Auchenorrhyncha
- Family: Membracidae
- Subfamily: Smiliinae
- Tribe: Telamonini
- Genus: Telamona
- Species: T. extrema

Binomial name
- Telamona extrema Ball, 1903

= Telamona extrema =

Species of insect

Telamona extrema is a species of treehopper in the family Membracidae. It is found in United States.
