= Neomegamelanus =

Scientific classification
- Domain: Eukaryota
- Kingdom: Animalia
- Phylum: Arthropoda
- Class: Insecta
- Order: Hemiptera
- Suborder: Auchenorrhyncha
- Infraorder: Fulgoromorpha
- Family: Delphacidae
- Subfamily: Delphacinae
- Genus: Neomegamelanus; McDermott, 1952

Species
- See text

Genus of true bugs

Neomegamelanus is a genus of delphacid planthoppers in the family Delphacidae. There are about five described species in Neomegamelanus.

== Species ==
- Neomegamelanus elongatus (Ball, 1905)
- Neomegamelanus graminicola (Muir, 1928)
- Neomegamelanus lautus (Metcalf, 1923)
- Neomegamelanus penilautus McDermott, 1952
- Neomegamelanus spartini (Osborn, 1905)
