= Telamona collina =

Scientific classification
- Kingdom: Animalia
- Phylum: Arthropoda
- Class: Insecta
- Order: Hemiptera
- Suborder: Auchenorrhyncha
- Family: Membracidae
- Genus: Telamona
- Species: T. collina

Binomial name
- Telamona collina (Walker, 1851)

Species of treehopper

Telamona collina, also known as the sycamore treehopper is a species of treehopper in the genus Telamona. The species was first described by Francis Walker in 1851.

== Distribution ==
Telamona collina can be found in Eastern North America.

== Appearance ==
The head and anterior of the pronotum is light-coloured whereas the rest of the pronotum is colored brown. Their pronotal crest faces forward.
