= Telamona tiliae =

Scientific classification
- Kingdom: Animalia
- Phylum: Arthropoda
- Class: Insecta
- Order: Hemiptera
- Suborder: Auchenorrhyncha
- Family: Membracidae
- Genus: Telamona
- Species: T. tiliae

Binomial name
- Telamona tiliae Ball, 1925

Species of treehopper

Telamona tiliae, also known as the basswood treehopper, is a species of treehopper in the family Membracidae. It was first described by Elmer Darwin Ball in 1925.

== Appearance ==
T. tiliae is similar to other members of Telamona, although the pronotal crest is lower. The pronotum can range from grayish green to brownish-yellow, and are riddled with dark brown markings. Females are 10 millimetres long, while males are about 9 millimetres long.

== Diet ==
T. tiliae feeds on many plants and trees, including:

- American Basswood (Tilia americana)
- Common Hackberry (Celtis occidentalis)
- Hawthorn (Crataegus sp.)
- Green Ash (Fraxinus pennsylvanica)
- Sweetgum (Liquidambar styraciflua)
- White Oak (Quercus alba)
- Bur Oak (Q. macrocarpa)
- Chinkapin Oak (Q. muehlenbergii)
- Northern Red Oak (Q. rubra)
- Black Oak (Q. velutina)
