= Telamona unicolor =

Scientific classification
- Kingdom: Animalia
- Phylum: Arthropoda
- Class: Insecta
- Order: Hemiptera
- Suborder: Auchenorrhyncha
- Family: Membracidae
- Genus: Telamona
- Species: T. unicolor

Binomial name
- Telamona unicolor Fitch, 1851

Species of treehopper

Telamona unicolor is a species of treehopper found in Canada. It belongs to the genus Telamona.
