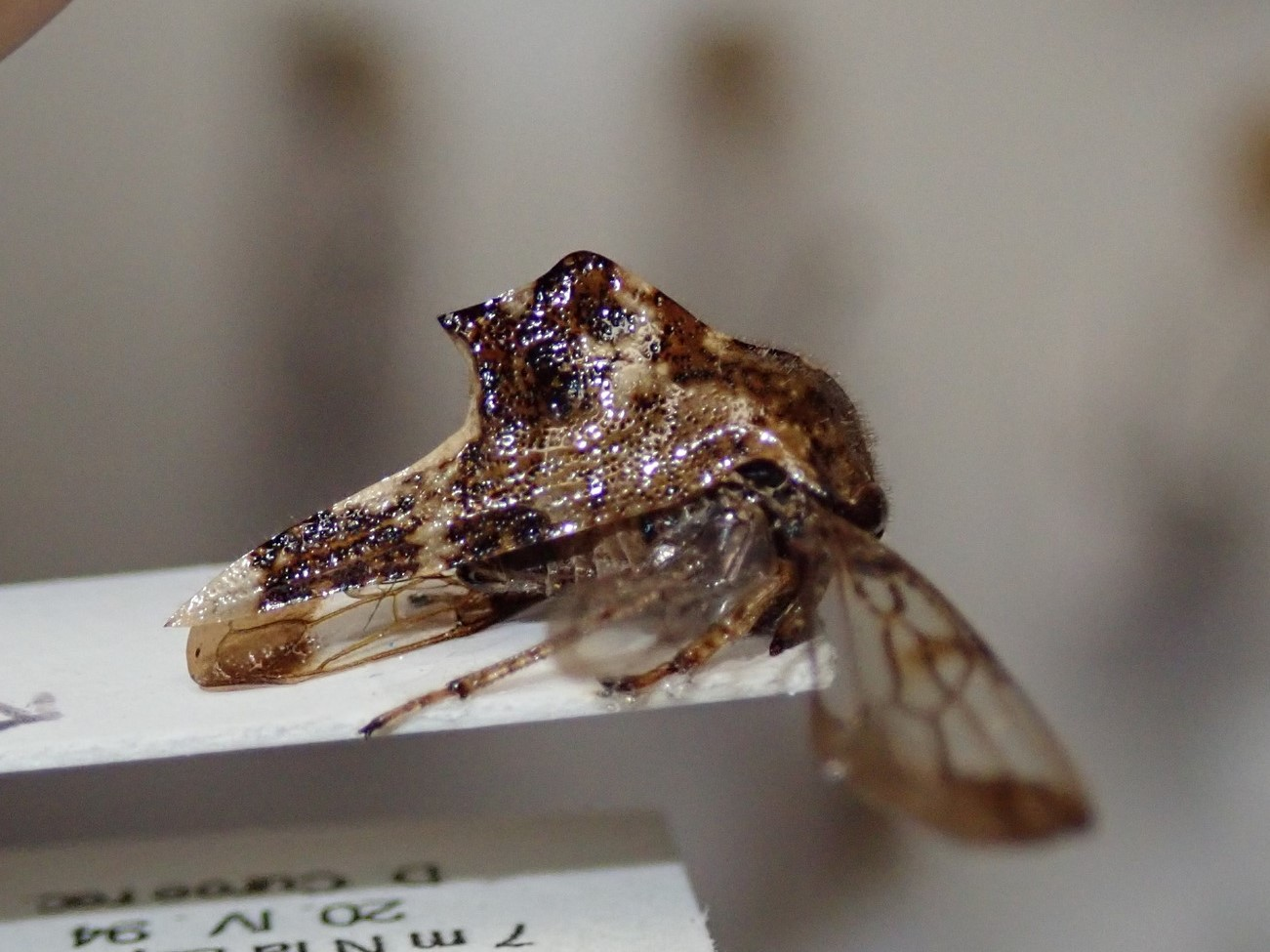

Scientific classification
- Kingdom: Animalia
- Phylum: Arthropoda
- Clade: Pancrustacea
- Class: Insecta
- Order: Hemiptera
- Suborder: Auchenorrhyncha
- Family: Membracidae
- Genus: Telamona
- Species: T. salvini

Binomial name
- Telamona salvini Fowler, 1896

= Telamona salvini =

Species of treehopper

Telamona salvini is a species of treehopper in the family Membracidae.
