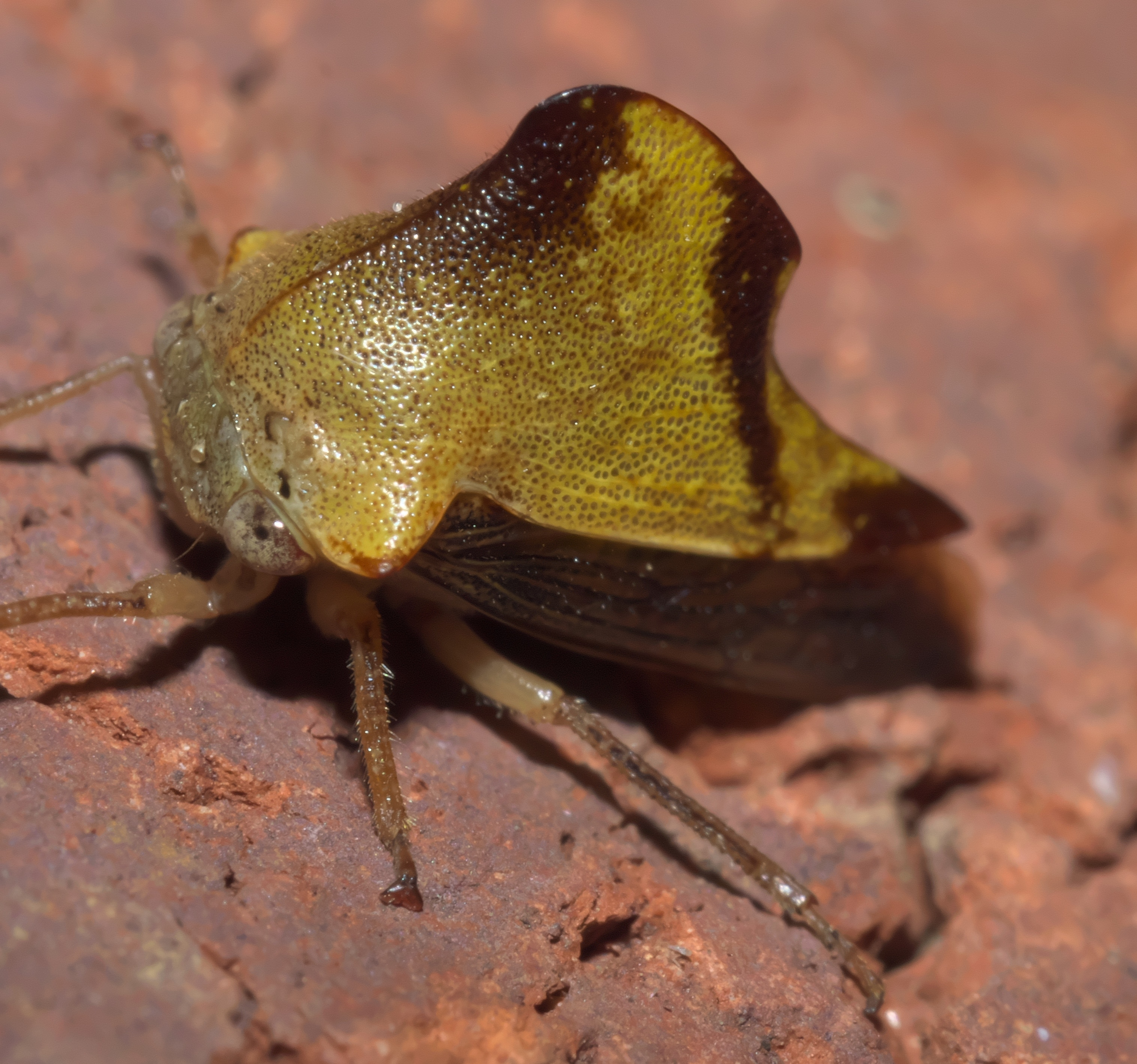

Scientific classification
- Kingdom: Animalia
- Phylum: Arthropoda
- Class: Insecta
- Order: Hemiptera
- Suborder: Auchenorrhyncha
- Family: Membracidae
- Genus: Telamona
- Species: T. excelsa

Binomial name
- Telamona excelsa Fairmaire

= Telamona excelsa =

Species of true bug

Telamona excelsa is a species of treehopper in the family Membracidae. It was first described by Léon Fairmaire in 1846.

== Description ==
Males of T. excelsa have a typical yellow-brown pronotum, with the front of the pronotal crest being dark brown. Females, however, are generally green-coloured. The pronotum is edged with black or brown, and have a higher pronotal crest. Males are 11 millimetres long, while females are 12 millimetres long.

== Distribution and habitat ==
Telamona excelsa can be found in the southwestern, central, and eastern United States and southeastern Canada.

== Diet ==
The following genera and species of trees are the hosts of T. excelsa:

- Castanea dentata (American chestnut)
- Carya (hickory)
- Carya cordiformis (bitternut hickory)
- Carya illinoinensis (pecan)
- Carya ovata (shagbark hickory)
- Carya glabra (pignut hickory)
- Carya pallida (sand hickory)
- Carya tomentosa (mockernut hickory)
- Juglans (walnut)
- J. cinerea (butternut)
- J. nigra (black walnut)
- Parthenocissus quinquefolia (Virginia creeper)
- Quercus alba (white oak)
- Q. macrocarpa (bur oak)
- Q. phellos (willow oak)
- Robinia pseudoacacia (black locust)
- Tilia americana (American basswood)
- Vitis (grape)

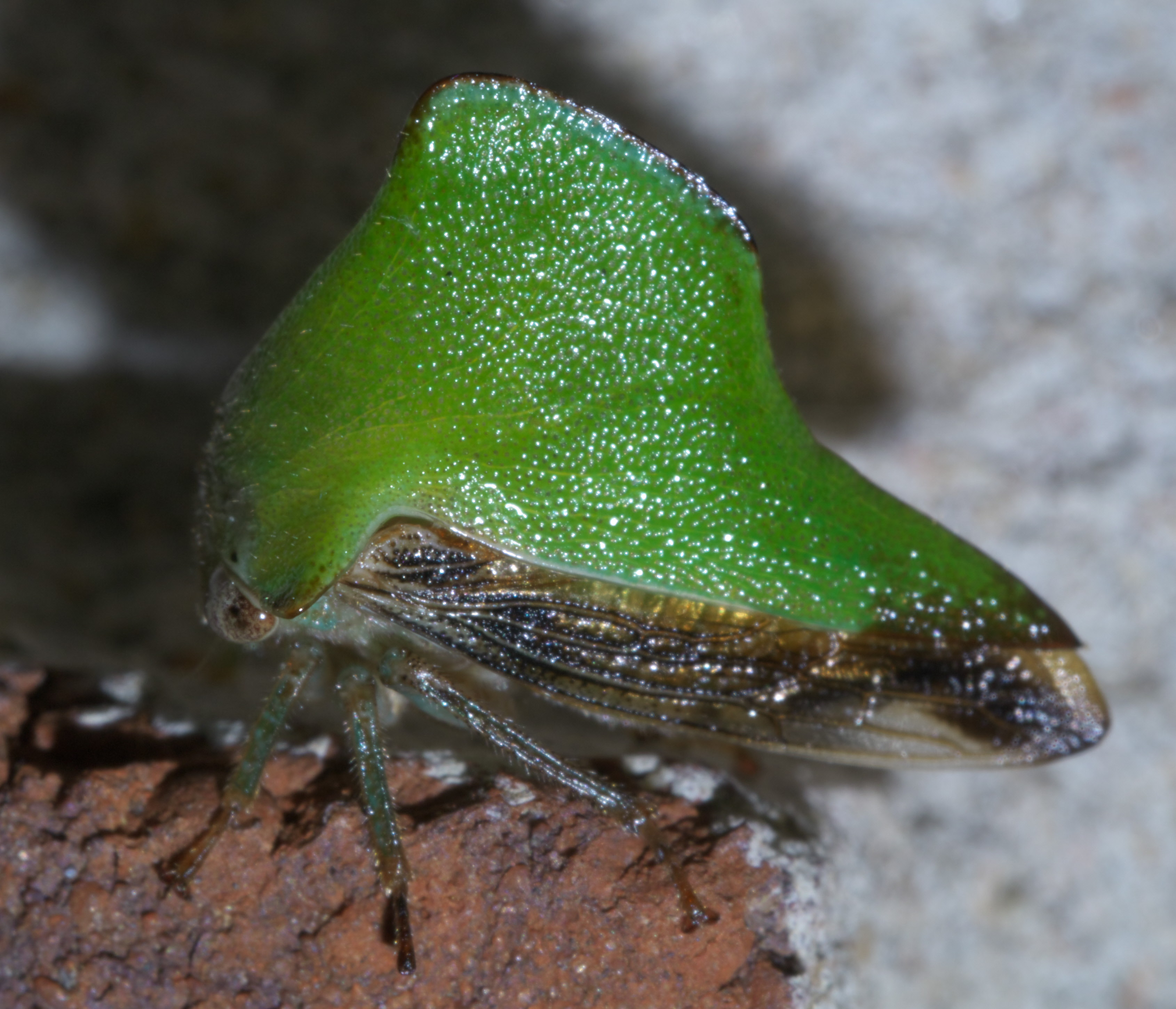

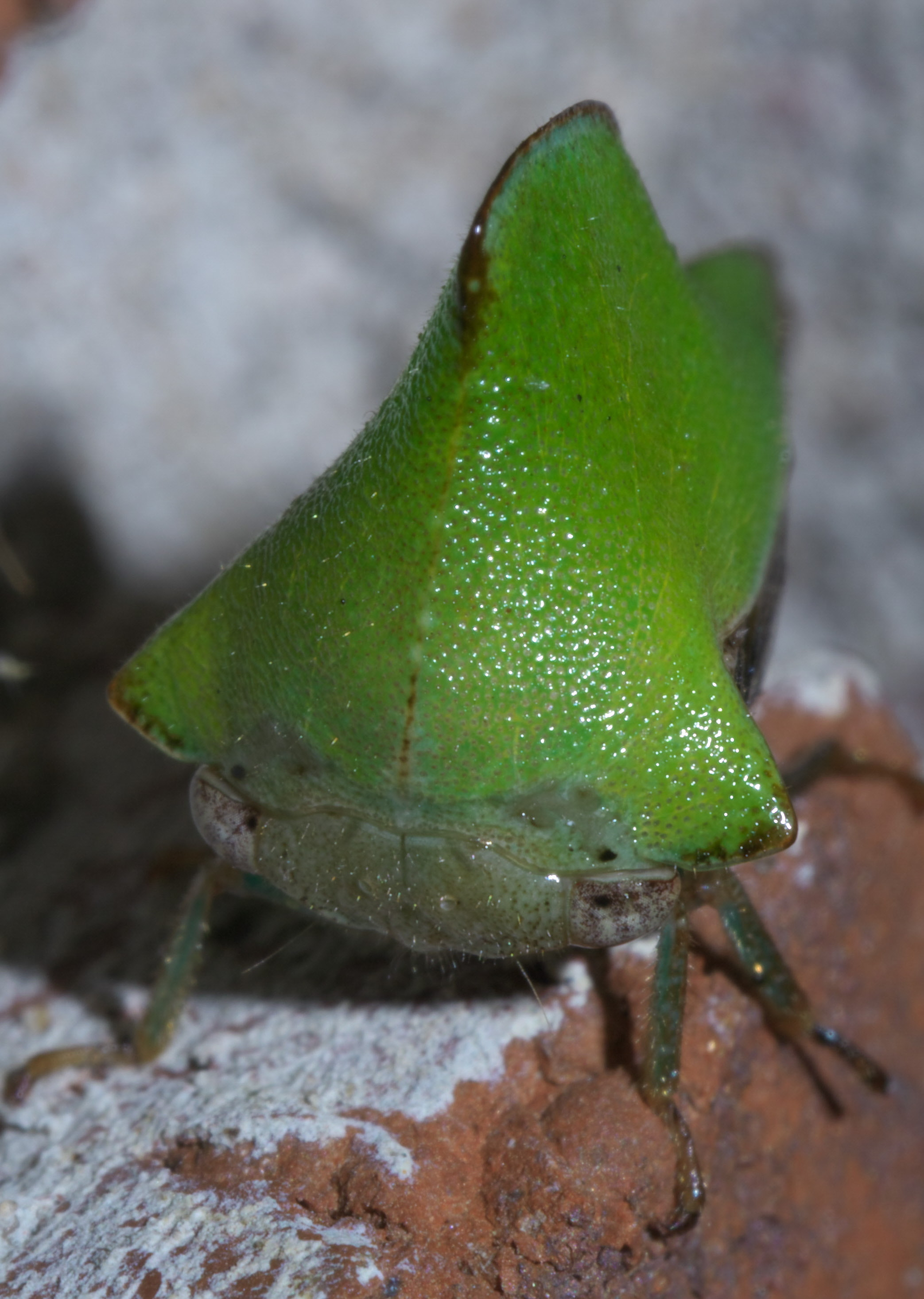
