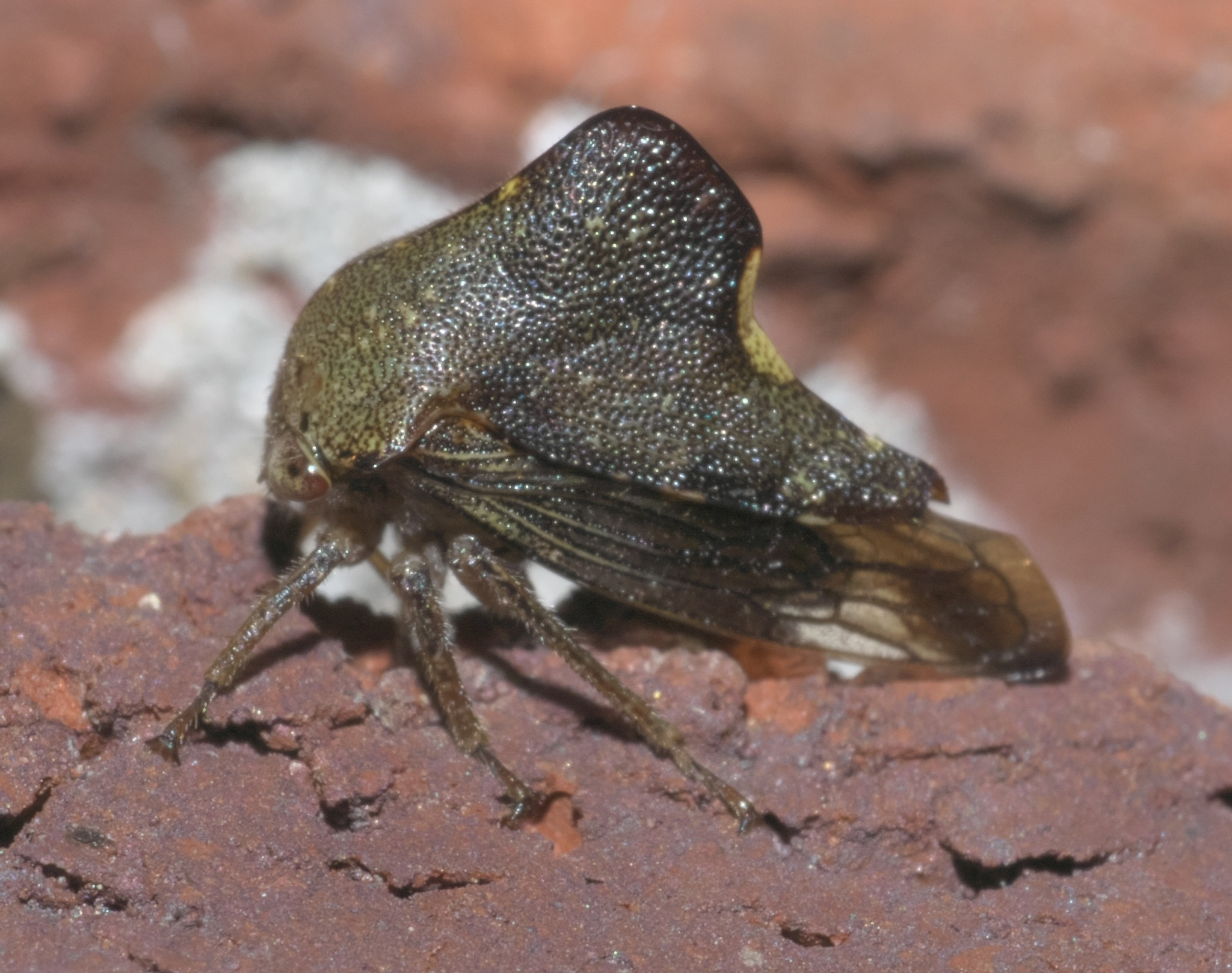
- Telamona monticola, Oklahoma

Scientific classification
- Kingdom: Animalia
- Phylum: Arthropoda
- Class: Insecta
- Order: Hemiptera
- Suborder: Auchenorrhyncha
- Family: Membracidae
- Genus: Telamona
- Species: T. monticola

Binomial name
- Telamona monticola Fabricius

= Telamona monticola =

Species of treehopper

Telamona monticola is a species of treehopper in the family Membracidae. It is commonly found on oak trees. Nymphal development occurs in eight weeks.
