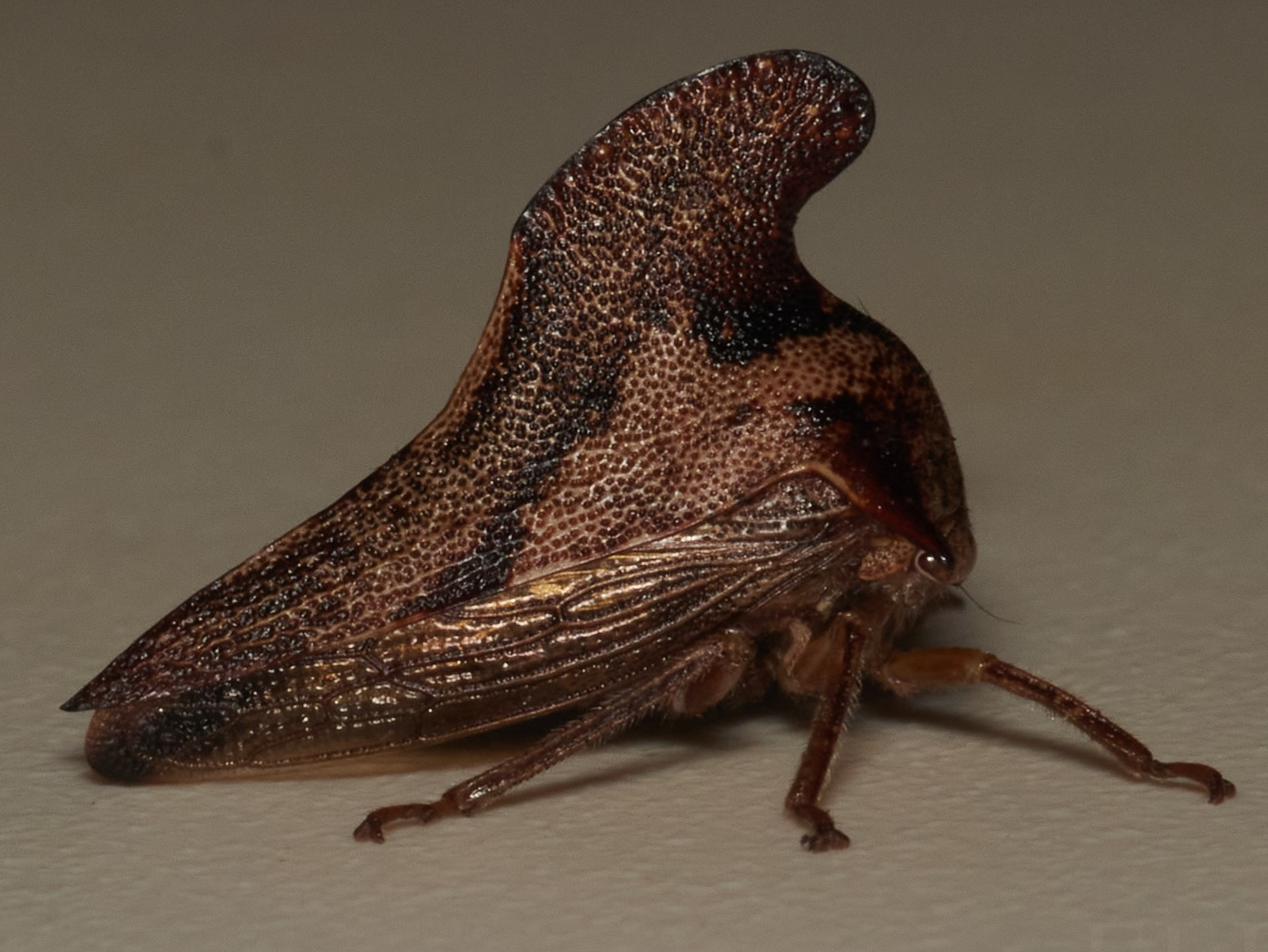

Scientific classification
- Kingdom: Animalia
- Phylum: Arthropoda
- Class: Insecta
- Order: Hemiptera
- Suborder: Auchenorrhyncha
- Family: Membracidae
- Genus: Telamona
- Species: T. projecta

Binomial name
- Telamona projecta Butler, 1877

Synonyms
- Helonica excelsa (Fairmaire 1846)

= Telamona projecta =

Species of treehopper

Telamona projecta is a species of treehopper in the family Membracidae.
