= Neomegamelanus lautus =

Scientific classification
- Domain: Eukaryota
- Kingdom: Animalia
- Phylum: Arthropoda
- Class: Insecta
- Order: Hemiptera
- Suborder: Auchenorrhyncha
- Infraorder: Fulgoromorpha
- Family: Delphacidae
- Genus: Neomegamelanus
- Species: N. lautus

Binomial name
- Neomegamelanus lautus (Metcalf, 1923)

Species of true bug

Neomegamelanus lautus is a species of delphacid planthopper in the family Delphacidae. It is found in Central America and North America.
