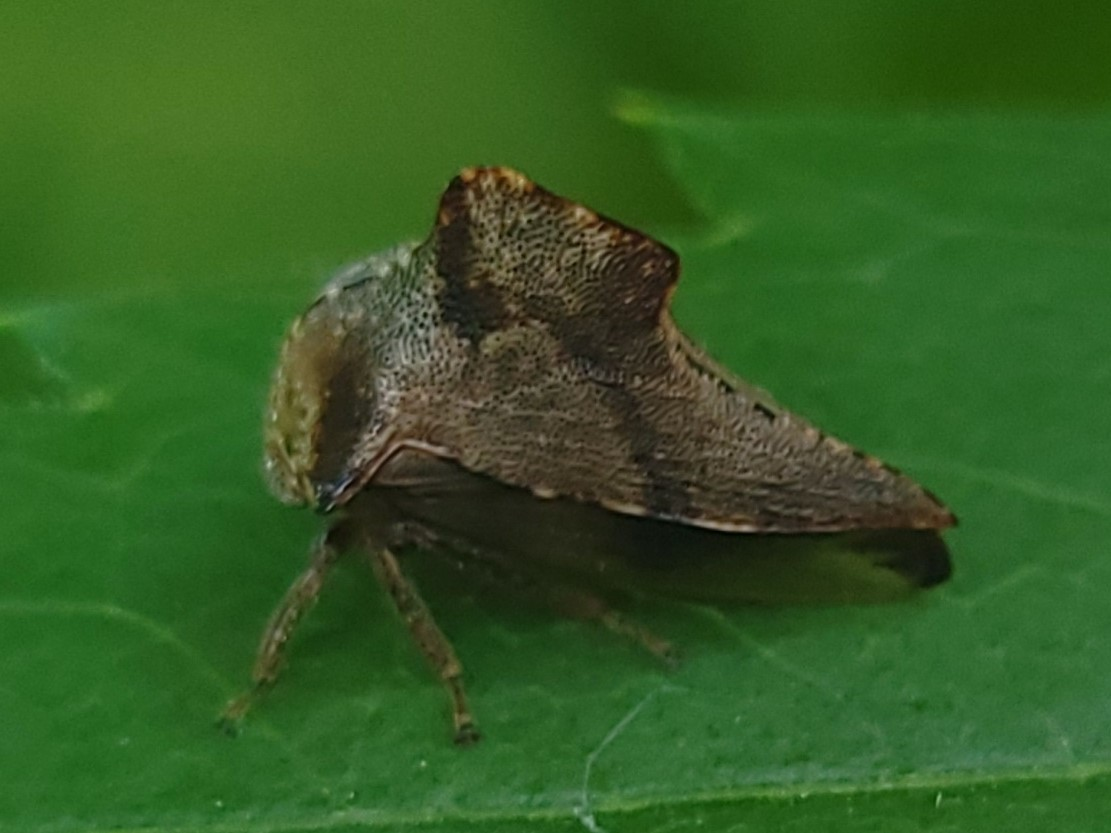

Scientific classification
- Kingdom: Animalia
- Phylum: Arthropoda
- Class: Insecta
- Order: Hemiptera
- Suborder: Auchenorrhyncha
- Family: Membracidae
- Genus: Telamona
- Species: T. ampelopsidis

Binomial name
- Telamona ampelopsidis (Harris, 1841)

Synonyms
- Membracis ampelopsidis Harris 1841; Telamona tigrina Ball, 1931

= Telamona ampelopsidis =

Species of treehopper

Telamona ampelopsidis, also known as the Virginia creeper treehopper, is one of the 38 species of treehoppers in the genus Telamona.

== Classification ==
T. ampelopsidis contains 2 subspecies:

- Telamona ampelopsidis ampelopsidis (Harris, 1841)
- Telamona ampelopsidis tigrina Ball, 1931

== Description ==
Males are usually 8-9 millimetre, while females are 10 millimetres. They have a brown-coloured pattern across the pronotum, and it varies slightly; some can be almost black and some can be light brown.

== Distribution ==
T. ampelopsidis is found in eastern United States and eastern Canada. It can also occasionally be found in central and midwestern United States, reaching as far as the Rocky Mountains.

== Diet ==
Telamona ampelopsidis, like all treehoppers, feeds on the sap from under leaves. However, T. ampelopsidis exclusively feeds on the Virginia creeper (Parthenocissus quinquefolia). The Virginia creeper was once placed in the genus Ampelopsis at the time that Thaddeus William Harris described the species in 1841, hence the species epithet Ampelopsidis.
