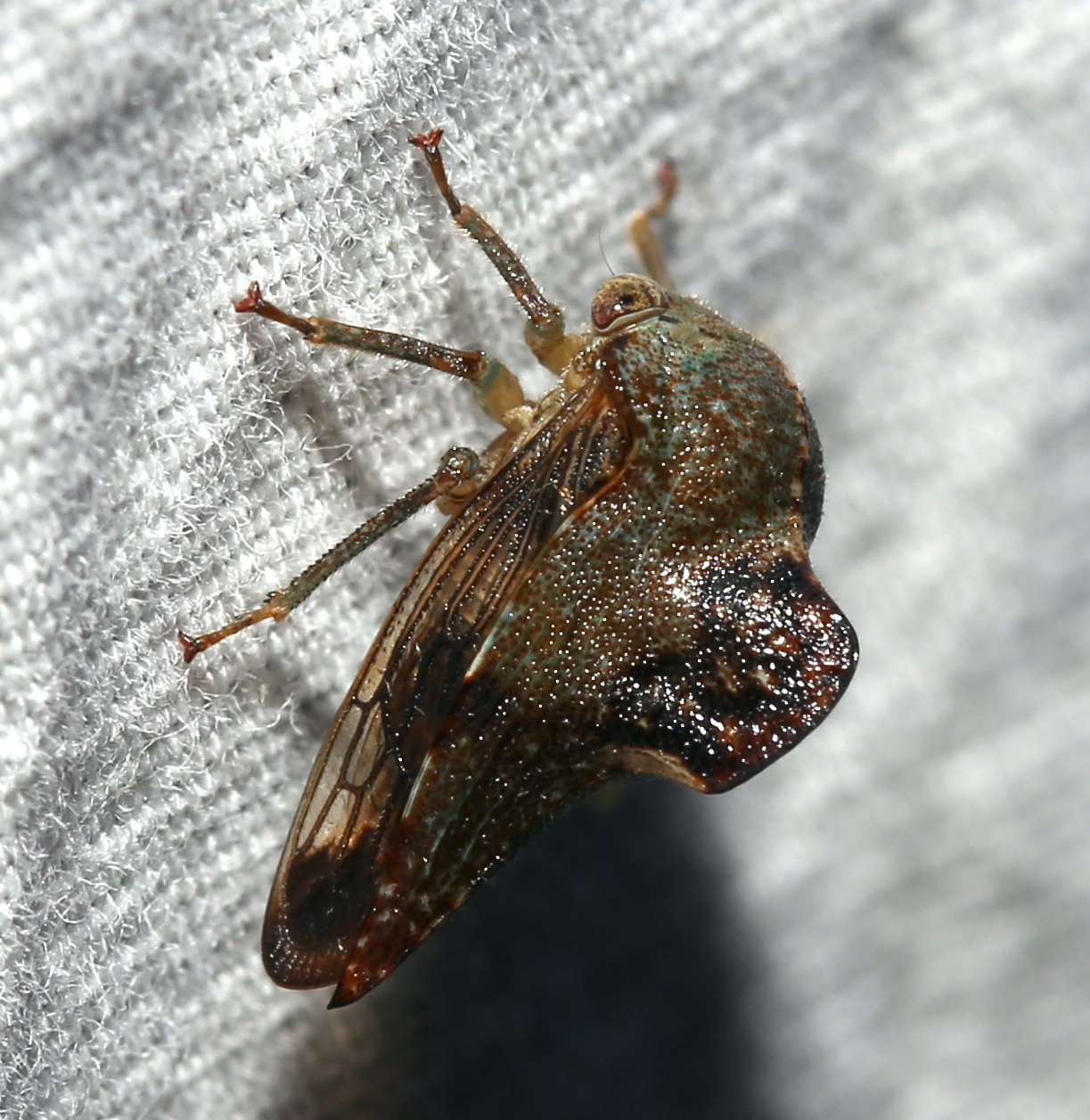

Scientific classification
- Kingdom: Animalia
- Phylum: Arthropoda
- Class: Insecta
- Order: Hemiptera
- Suborder: Auchenorrhyncha
- Family: Membracidae
- Genus: Telamona
- Species: T. decorata

Binomial name
- Telamona decorata Ball, 1903

= Telamona decorata =

Species of insect

Telamona decorata is a species of treehopper in the family Membracidae.
