= Telamona lugubris =

Scientific classification
- Kingdom: Animalia
- Phylum: Arthropoda
- Clade: Pancrustacea
- Class: Insecta
- Order: Hemiptera
- Suborder: Auchenorrhyncha
- Family: Membracidae
- Genus: Telamona
- Species: T. lugubris

Binomial name
- Telamona lugubris Ball

"+shortd+"

Telamona lugubris is a species of treehopper in the family Membracidae.

Its observed length is about 10mm and its width is about 5.5mm. Its color is pale yellow. It was described from specimens from Iowa and Kansas.
