= Millard Carr Van Duzee =

American entomologist (1860–1934)

- Born: February 20, 1860; Cincinnati, Ohio
- Died: April 21, 1934 (aged 74); Buffalo, New York
- Known for: Taxonomy of Dolichopodidae
- Scientific career
- Fields: Entomology, Dipterology

Millard Carr Van Duzee (February 20, 1860 – April 21, 1934) was an American entomologist specializing in dipterology.

He was born in 1860 in Cincinnati. His father was William Sanford Van Duzee, a missionary, naturalist, and businessman. His younger brother was Edward Payson Van Duzee, also an entomologist. Shortly after Edward’s birth, the family moved to the corner of Main and Riley Street in Buffalo.

After his father’s death in 1883, he took over the family construction business, though from an early age he had been interested in natural history. In 1908 he began to work regularly on dipterology, and his first entomological article was published in 1911. Up to the decline of his health in 1934, he wrote 86 scientific papers.

He specialized in the taxonomy of the Dolichopodidae. He described nine genera new to science and 914 new species. His collection, consisting of about 20,000 specimens, was deposited in the California Academy of Sciences in 1931. He died in 1934 at his desk in the family home in Buffalo.
