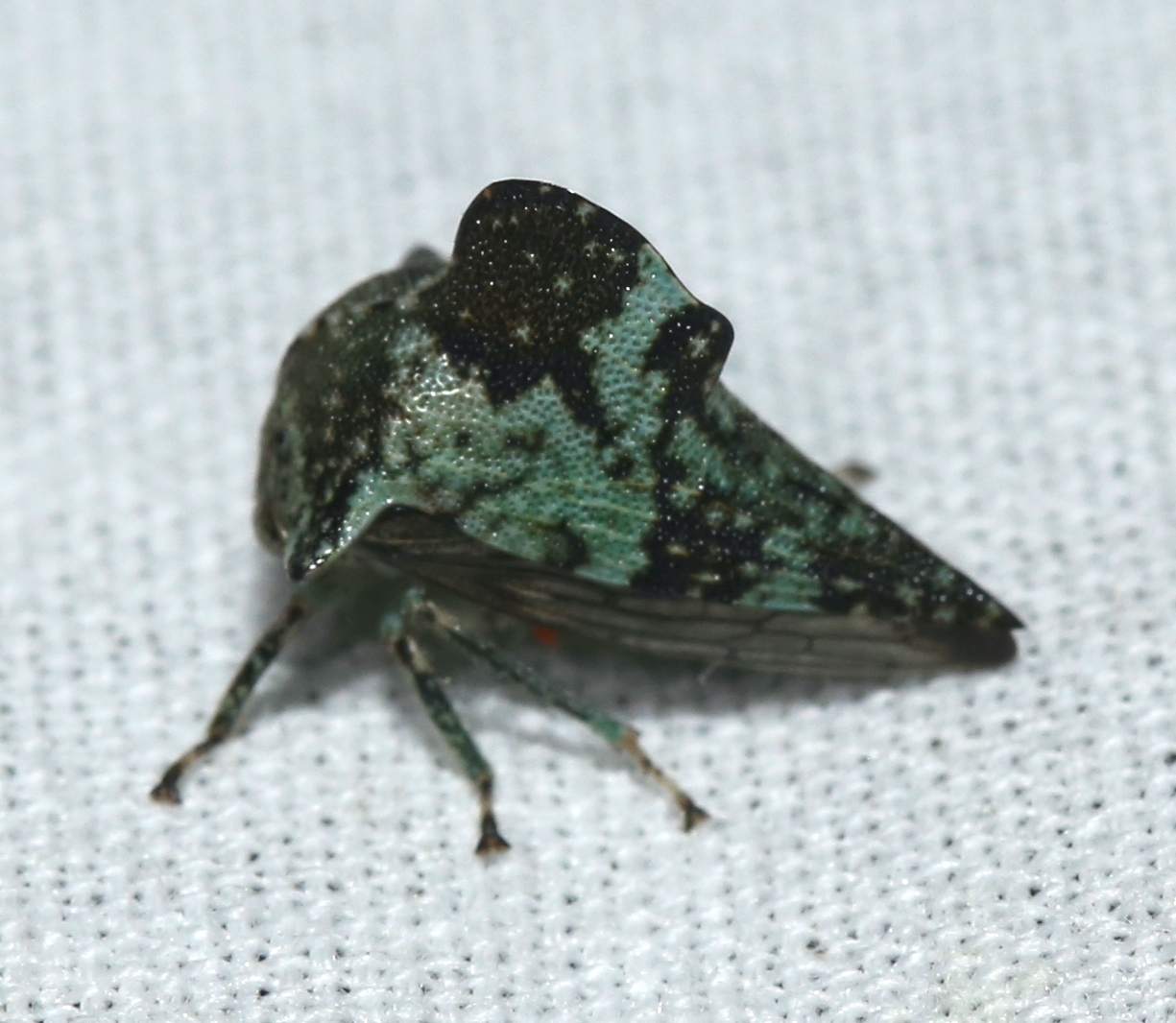

Scientific classification
- Kingdom: Animalia
- Phylum: Arthropoda
- Class: Insecta
- Order: Hemiptera
- Suborder: Auchenorrhyncha
- Family: Membracidae
- Genus: Telamona
- Species: T. concava

Binomial name
- Telamona concava Fitch, 1851

= Telamona concava =

Species of insect

Telamona concava is a species of treehopper in the family Membracidae. It was first described by Asa Fitch in 1851.

== Distribution ==
Telamona concava is found in the eastern portion of North America, and can be found in the summer months.

== Diet ==
Telamona concava feeds on the white oak (Quercus alba) and the black oak (Quercus velutina).
