= Telamona ruficarinata =

Scientific classification
- Kingdom: Animalia
- Phylum: Arthropoda
- Class: Insecta
- Order: Hemiptera
- Suborder: Auchenorrhyncha
- Family: Membracidae
- Genus: Telamona
- Species: T. ruficarinata

Binomial name
- Telamona ruficarinata (Fowler, 1894)

Species of treehopper

Telamona ruficarinata is a species of treehopper. It belongs to the genus Telamona. It was first described by Henry Weed Fowler from a male specimen collected in Bogota, Colombia in 1894.
