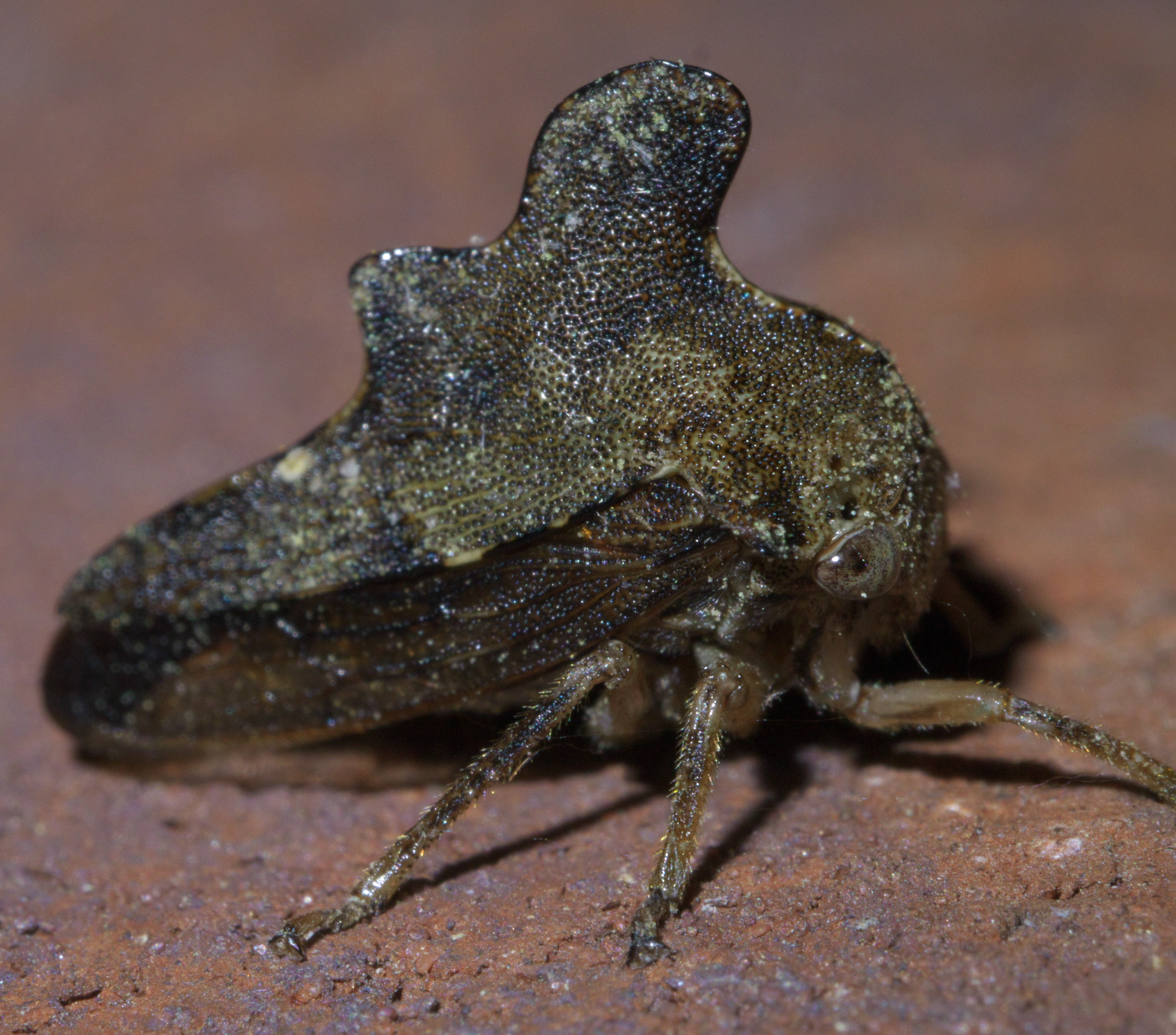

Scientific classification
- Kingdom: Animalia
- Phylum: Arthropoda
- Class: Insecta
- Order: Hemiptera
- Suborder: Auchenorrhyncha
- Family: Membracidae
- Genus: Telamona
- Species: T. scalaris

Binomial name
- Telamona scalaris (Thorell, 1881)

= Telamona scalaris =

Species of treehopper

Telamona scalaris is a species of treehopper belonging to the genus Telamona. It is found in Canada.
