= Telamona balli =

Scientific classification
- Kingdom: Animalia
- Phylum: Arthropoda
- Class: Insecta
- Order: Hemiptera
- Suborder: Auchenorrhyncha
- Family: Membracidae
- Genus: Telamona
- Species: T. balli

Binomial name
- Telamona balli Plummer

Species of insect

Telamona balli is a species of treehopper in the family Membracidae.
