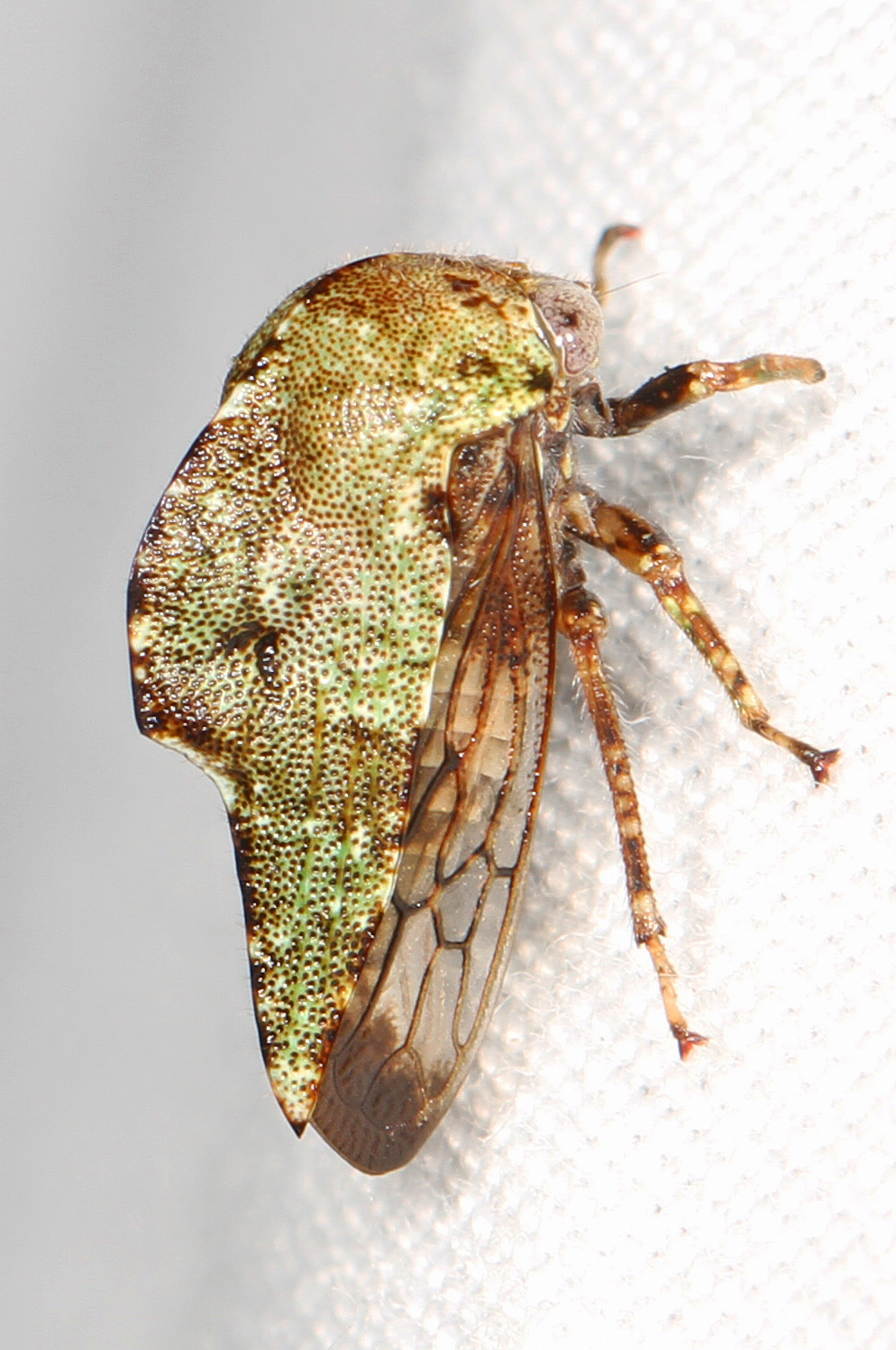
- Found in Georgia

Scientific classification
- Kingdom: Animalia
- Phylum: Arthropoda
- Class: Insecta
- Order: Hemiptera
- Suborder: Auchenorrhyncha
- Family: Membracidae
- Genus: Telamona
- Species: T. westcotti

Binomial name
- Telamona westcotti Goding

= Telamona westcotti =

Species of treehopper

Telamona westcotti is a species of treehopper. It belongs to the genus Telamona.
