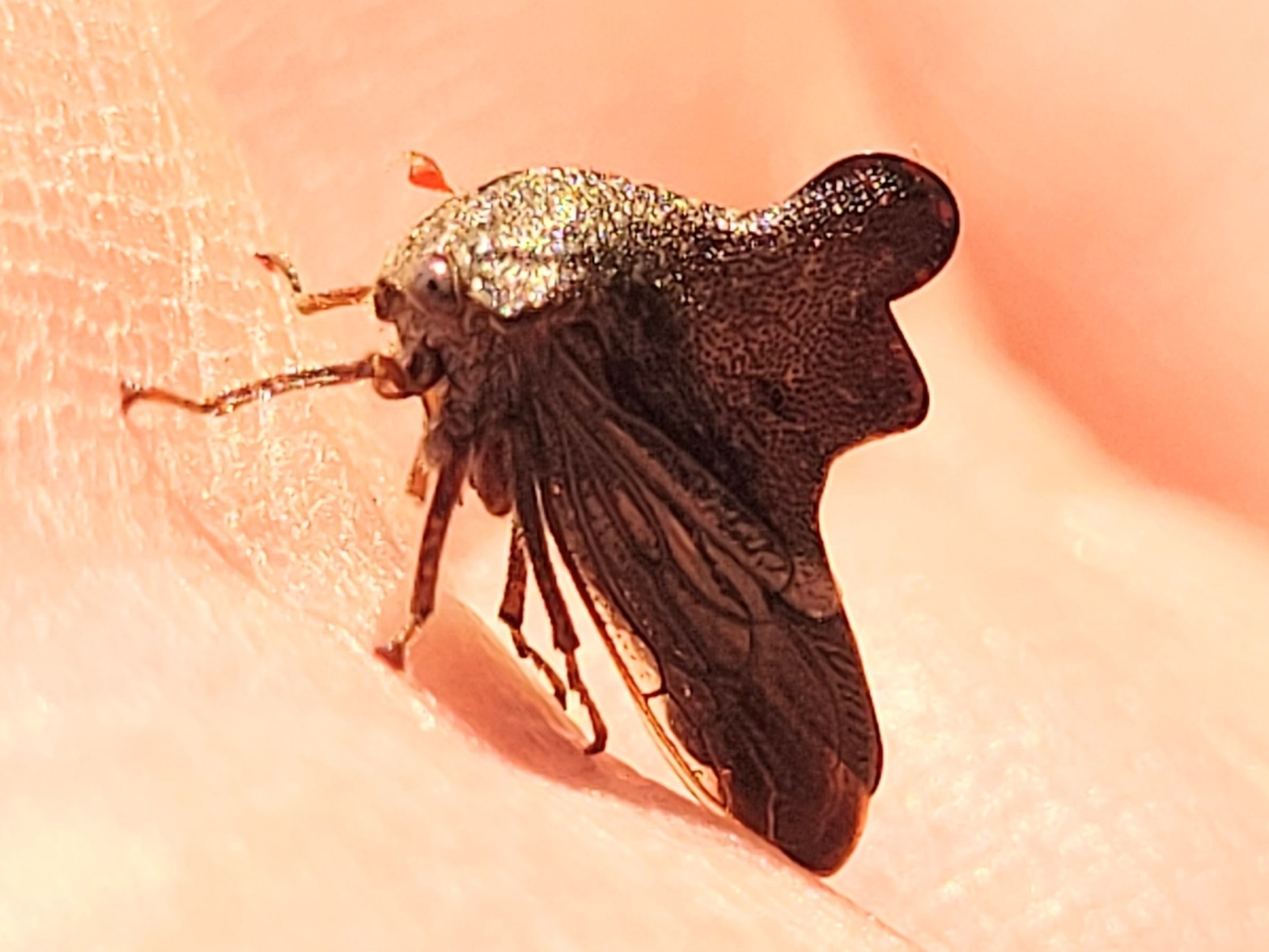

Scientific classification
- Kingdom: Animalia
- Phylum: Arthropoda
- Class: Insecta
- Order: Hemiptera
- Suborder: Auchenorrhyncha
- Family: Membracidae
- Genus: Heliria
- Species: H. praealta

Binomial name
- Heliria praealta (Fowler, 1894)

Synonyms
- Telamona praealta Fowler, 1894; Telamona rubidella Ball, 1918; Heliria rubidella (Ball, 1918)

= Heliria praealta =

Species of treehopper

Heliria praealta is a species of treehopper in the family Membracidae. It is found in the western United States and Canada.

== Taxonomy ==
There are two subspecies recognised:

- Heliria praealta praealta (Fowler, 1894)
- Heliria praealta rubidella (Ball, 1918)
