= Telamona molaris =

Scientific classification
- Kingdom: Animalia
- Phylum: Arthropoda
- Class: Insecta
- Order: Hemiptera
- Suborder: Auchenorrhyncha
- Family: Membracidae
- Genus: Telamona
- Species: T. molaris

Binomial name
- Telamona molaris Butler, A.G., 1877

Synonyms
- Heliria molaris (Butler, A.G., 1877); Telamona westcotti Funkhouser, 1917; Heliria molaris Ball, 1931

Species of treehopper

Telamona molaris is a species of treehopper in the family Membracidae.
