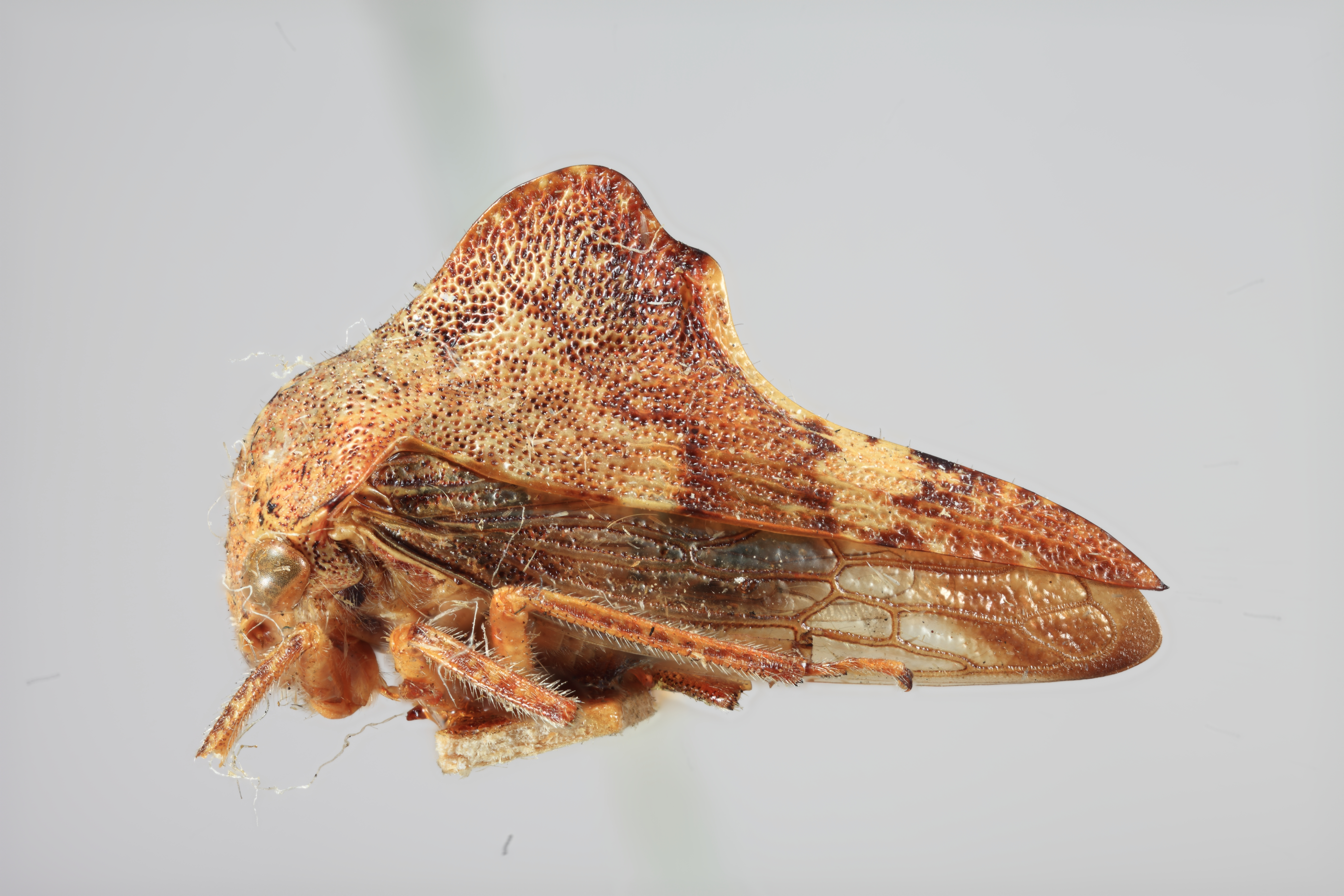

Scientific classification
- Kingdom: Animalia
- Phylum: Arthropoda
- Clade: Pancrustacea
- Class: Insecta
- Order: Hemiptera
- Suborder: Auchenorrhyncha
- Family: Membracidae
- Genus: Heliria
- Species: H. gemma

Binomial name
- Heliria gemma Ball, 1925

Synonyms
- Telamona gemma (Ball, 1925)

= Heliria gemma =

Species of insect

Heliria gemma is a species of treehopper in the family Membracidae. The species is found in Eastern North America.
