= Edward P. Van Duzee =

American entomologist

Edward Payson Van Duzee
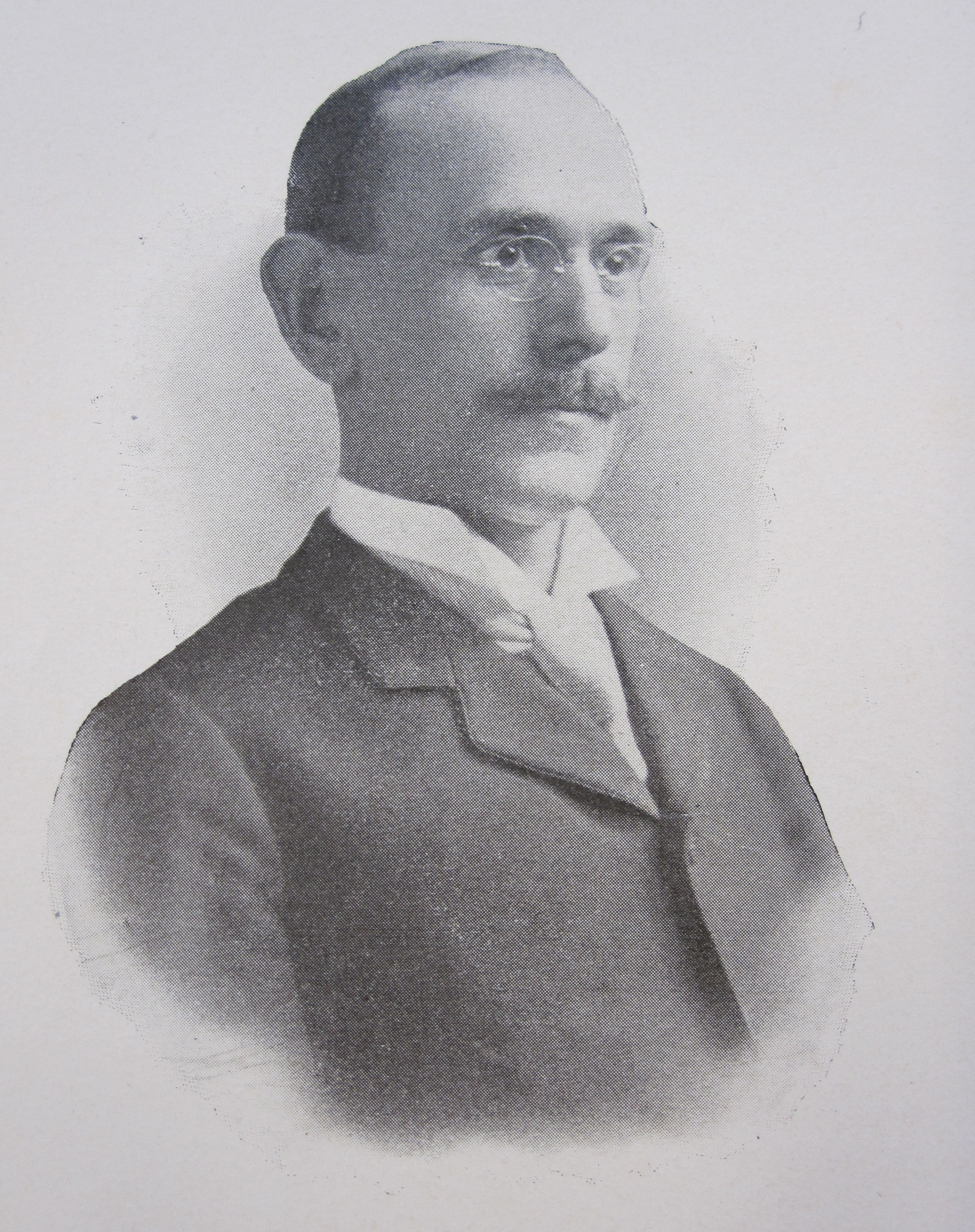
- Born: 6 April 1861; New York City, New York
- Died: 2 June 1940 (aged 79); Alameda, California
- Citizenship: United States
- Known for: Hemiptera taxonomy (Catalogue of the Hemiptera, 1917), founded Pan Pacific Entomologist, 1924
- Scientific career
- Fields: Entomology
- Workplaces: Grosvenor Library of Buffalo; California Academy of Sciences
- Author abbrev. (zoology): Van Duzee

Edward Payson Van Duzee (6 April 1861 – 2 June 1940) was an American entomologist noted for his work on Hemiptera. As of 1885, he was a librarian at Grosvenor Library of Buffalo New York for 28 years, and then relocated to California in 1912 where he took a position at Scripps Institute in La Jolla. The same year, Van Duzee became a fellow at the Entomological Society of America. Due to his fellowship, Van Duzee was appointed as an instructor of entomology at the University of California, Berkeley, from 1914 to 1916, after which he was served as curator of the entomology collection at the California Academy of Sciences from 1916 to 1940. At the time of his death, he had approximately 165 publications in addition to his noted Catalogue of the Hemiptera where he established 46 new genera and 906 species or subspecies.

The following is drawn from a brief unpublished autobiographical sketch written by Van Duzee in January, 1940: His father was Dr. William Sanford Van Duzee, natural historian and amateur astronomer (a Fitz refractory telescope intended for the University of Virginia came into his possession in 1861 due to a failed sale because of war conditions). Shortly after Edward Payson's birth, the family left New York and returned to Buffalo (corner of Main and Riley Streets) where the family home housed a small natural history museum and the Fitz telescope housed in a specially-built three-story structure that was opened for public viewing. Meetings of like-minded took place in the home and the Buffalo Society for Natural History was thus born. His brother, Millard Carr Van Duzee, published in entomology as well.
