= Elmer Darwin Ball =

American entomologist (1870–1943)

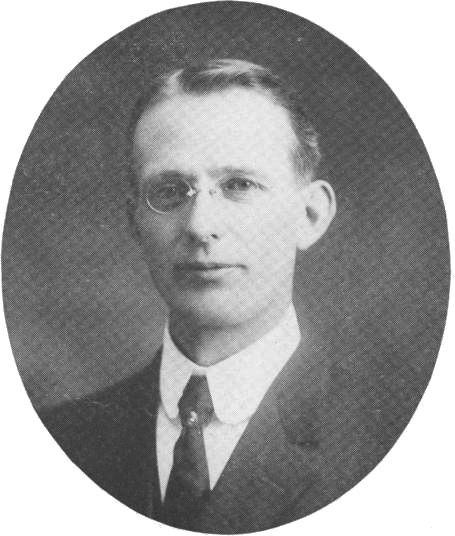
- Born: September 21, 1870; Athens, Vermont, U.S.
- Died: October 5, 1943 (aged 73); Pasadena, California, U.S.
- Scientific career
- Fields: Entomology

Assistant Secretary of Agriculture
- In office June 12, 1920 – September 30, 1921
- President: Woodrow Wilson; Warren G. Harding
- Preceded by: James R. Riggs
- Succeeded by: Charles W. Pugsley

Elmer Darwin Ball (September 21, 1870 – October 5, 1943) was an American entomologist. Ball is known for his contributions to the knowledge of the leafhoppers, treehoppers, froghoppers, and other related insects. He was Assistant Secretary of Agriculture from 1920 to 1921.

== Biography ==
Born in Athens, Vermont, his family moved to Iowa shortly after, where Ball received his early education. He earned B.S. and M.S. degrees from Iowa State College in 1895 and 1898, respectively. Ball married Mildred R. Norvell in 1899. After a brief stint as a school teacher and then assistant principal of Albion Seminary, he began teaching zoology and entomology at Iowa State College, and then at Colorado Agricultural College. After this he became a professor in the Utah Agricultural College, and commenced graduate work with Herbert Osborn as his mentor. Specializing in the biology of leafhoppers and related taxa, he received his Ph.D. from Ohio State University in 1907. That same year he became the dean of the Utah Agricultural College.

In 1908, Ball became a Fellow of the Entomological Society of America.

In 1916, Ball became the state entomologist of Wisconsin for two years before returning to serve as the head of the department of zoology and entomology at Iowa State. Ball went on leave from Iowa State to serve as Assistant Secretary of Agriculture for two years, from June 12, 1920, to September 30, 1921. He was employed at the U.S. Department of Agriculture from 1921 to 1925 as the scientific research director. Following this, he worked for the Florida State Plant Board, where he researched insect pathogens of celery. In 1928, he was appointed dean of the College of Agriculture and director of the Agricultural Experiment Station at the University of Arizona, where he worked until illness prevented him from doing so. After suffering a cerebral hemorrhage in February, 1938, he went on extended leave. After five years of illness, Ball died on October 5, 1943, in Pasadena, California. His papers are held in the collection of the Smithsonian Institution Archives.
