= Stenocranus felti =

Scientific classification
- Domain: Eukaryota
- Kingdom: Animalia
- Phylum: Arthropoda
- Class: Insecta
- Order: Hemiptera
- Suborder: Auchenorrhyncha
- Infraorder: Fulgoromorpha
- Family: Delphacidae
- Genus: Stenocranus
- Species: S. felti

Binomial name
- Stenocranus felti Van Duzee, 1910

Species of true bug

Stenocranus felti is a species of delphacid planthopper in the family Delphacidae. It is found in North America.
