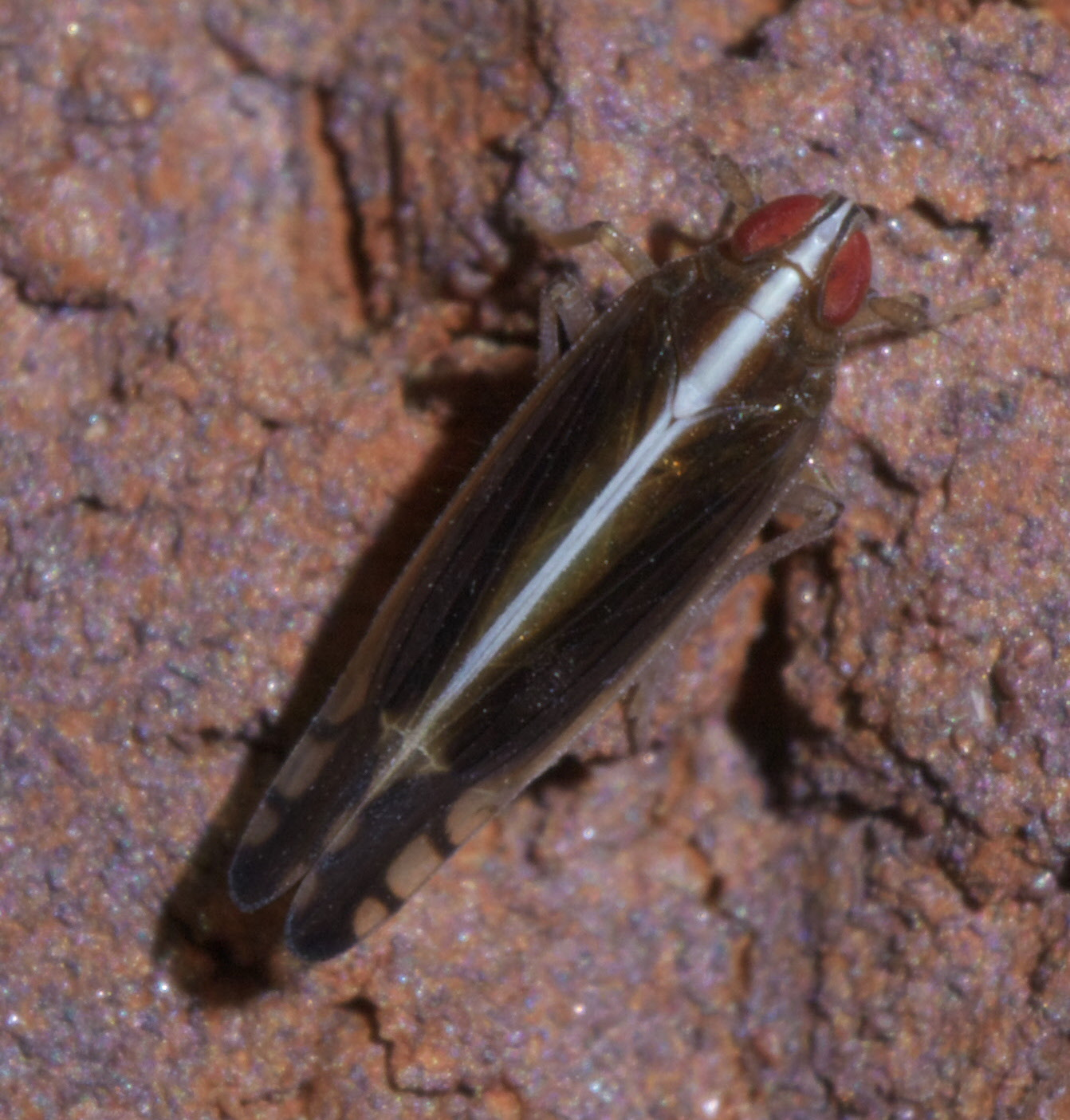

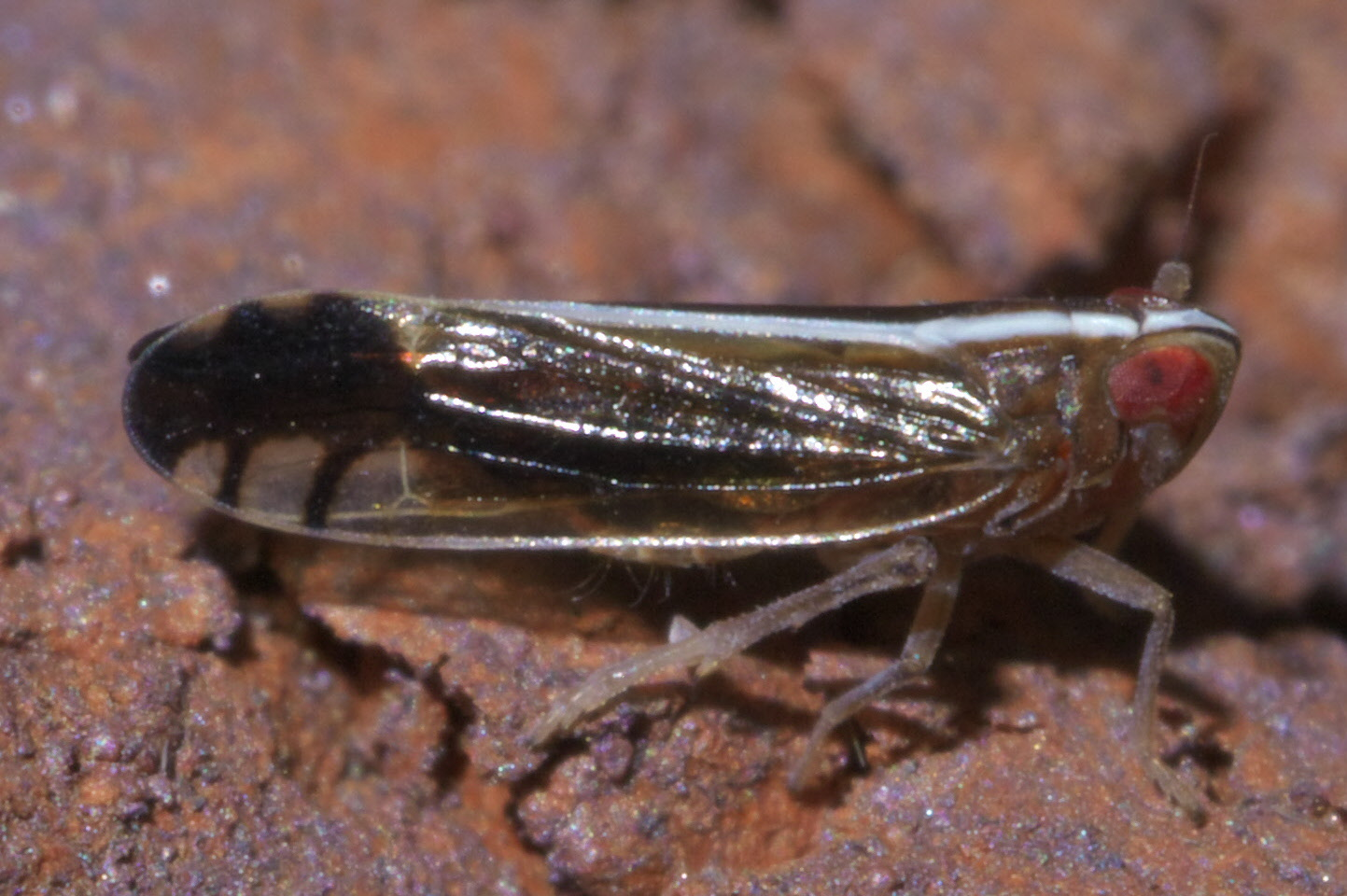

Scientific classification
- Kingdom: Animalia
- Phylum: Arthropoda
- Clade: Pancrustacea
- Class: Insecta
- Order: Hemiptera
- Suborder: Auchenorrhyncha
- Infraorder: Fulgoromorpha
- Family: Delphacidae
- Subfamily: Stenocraninae
- Genus: Stenocranus; Fieber, 1866

Diversity
- 70+ species

= Stenocranus =

Genus of true bugs

Stenocranus is a genus of planthoppers that belongs to the family Delphacidae.

== Taxonomy ==
=== Species ===
There are currently more than 70 described species that belong to this genus. They are listed below:

- Stenocranus acutus Beamer, 1946
- Stenocranus agamopsyche Kirkaldy, 1906
- Stenocranus ajmerensis Joseph, 1964
- Stenocranus akashiensis Matsumura, 1935
- Stenocranus angustus Crawford, 1914
- Stenocranus anomalus Chen & Liang, 2005
- Stenocranus arundineus Metcalf, 1923
- Stenocranus bakeri Muir, 1917
- Stenocranus brunneus Beamer, 1946
- Stenocranus carolinensis Metcalf, 1954
- Stenocranus castaneus Ding, 1981
- Stenocranus chenzhouensis Ding, 1981
- Stenocranus cyperi Ding, 2006
- Stenocranus danjicus Kuoh, 1980
- Stenocranus delicatus Beamer, 1946
- Stenocranus distinctus Muir, 1929
- Stenocranus dorsalis (Fitch, 1851)
- Stenocranus elongatus Matsumura, 1935
- Stenocranus fallax Matsumura, 1935
- Stenocranus felti Van Duzee, 1910
- Stenocranus formosanus Matsumura, 1935
- Stenocranus fuscovittatus (Stål, 1858)
- Stenocranus gialovus Asche & Hoch, 1983
- Stenocranus harimensis Matsumura, 1935
- Stenocranus hokkaidoensis Metcalf, 1943
- Stenocranus hongtiaus Kuoh, 1980
- Stenocranus hopponis Matsumura, 1935
- Stenocranus japonicus Esaki, 1932
- Stenocranus jiangpuensis Ding, 2006
- Stenocranus koreanus Matsumura, 1935
- Stenocranus lautus Van Duzee, 1897
- Stenocranus linearis Ding, 1981
- Stenocranus linnapallidus Asche, 1985
- Stenocranus longicapitis Ding, 1981
- Stenocranus longipennis (Curtis, 1837)
- Stenocranus luteus Muir, 1917
- Stenocranus macromaculatus Ding, 2006
- Stenocranus maculipes (Berg, 1879)
- Stenocranus major (Kirschbaum, 1868)
- Stenocranus matsumurai Metcalf, 1943
- Stenocranus minutus (Fabricius, 1787)
- Stenocranus montanus Huang & Ding, 1980
- Stenocranus neopacificus Muir, 1917
- Stenocranus nigrocaudatus Ding, 1981
- Stenocranus nigrofrons Muir
- Stenocranus niisimai Matsumura, 1935
- Stenocranus ogasawarensis Matsumura, 1935
- Stenocranus oroba Fennah, 1975
- Stenocranus ozenumensis Ishihara, 1952
- Stenocranus pacificus Kirkaldy, 1907
- Stenocranus pallidus Beamer, 1946
- Stenocranus philippinensis Muir, 1917
- Stenocranus planus Yang, 1989
- Stenocranus polenor Fennah, 1975
- Stenocranus pseudopacificus Muir, 1916
- Stenocranus qiandainus Kuoh, 1980
- Stenocranus ramosus Beamer, 1946
- Stenocranus rufilinearis Kuoh, 1981
- Stenocranus sandersoni Beamer, 1946
- Stenocranus sapporensis Matsumura, 1935
- Stenocranus seminigrifrons Muir, 1923
- Stenocranus silvicola Vilbaste, 1968
- Stenocranus silvicolus Vilbaste, 1968
- Stenocranus similis Crawford, 1914
- Stenocranus spinosus Ding, 1994
- Stenocranus sukumonus Matsumura, 1935
- Stenocranus takasagonis Matsumura, 1935
- Stenocranus tamagawanus Matsumura, 1935
- Stenocranus tartareus Fennah, 1958
- Stenocranus tateyamanus Matsumura, 1935
- Stenocranus testaceaus Kuoh, 1981
- Stenocranus testaceus Ding, 1981
- Stenocranus tonghuaensis Ding, 2006
- Stenocranus unipunctatus (Provancher, 1872)
- Stenocranus vittatus (Stål, 1862)
- Stenocranus yasumatsui Ishihara, 1952
- Stenocranus yuanmaonus Kuoh, 1980
- Stenocranus zalantunensis Ding & Hu, 1994
