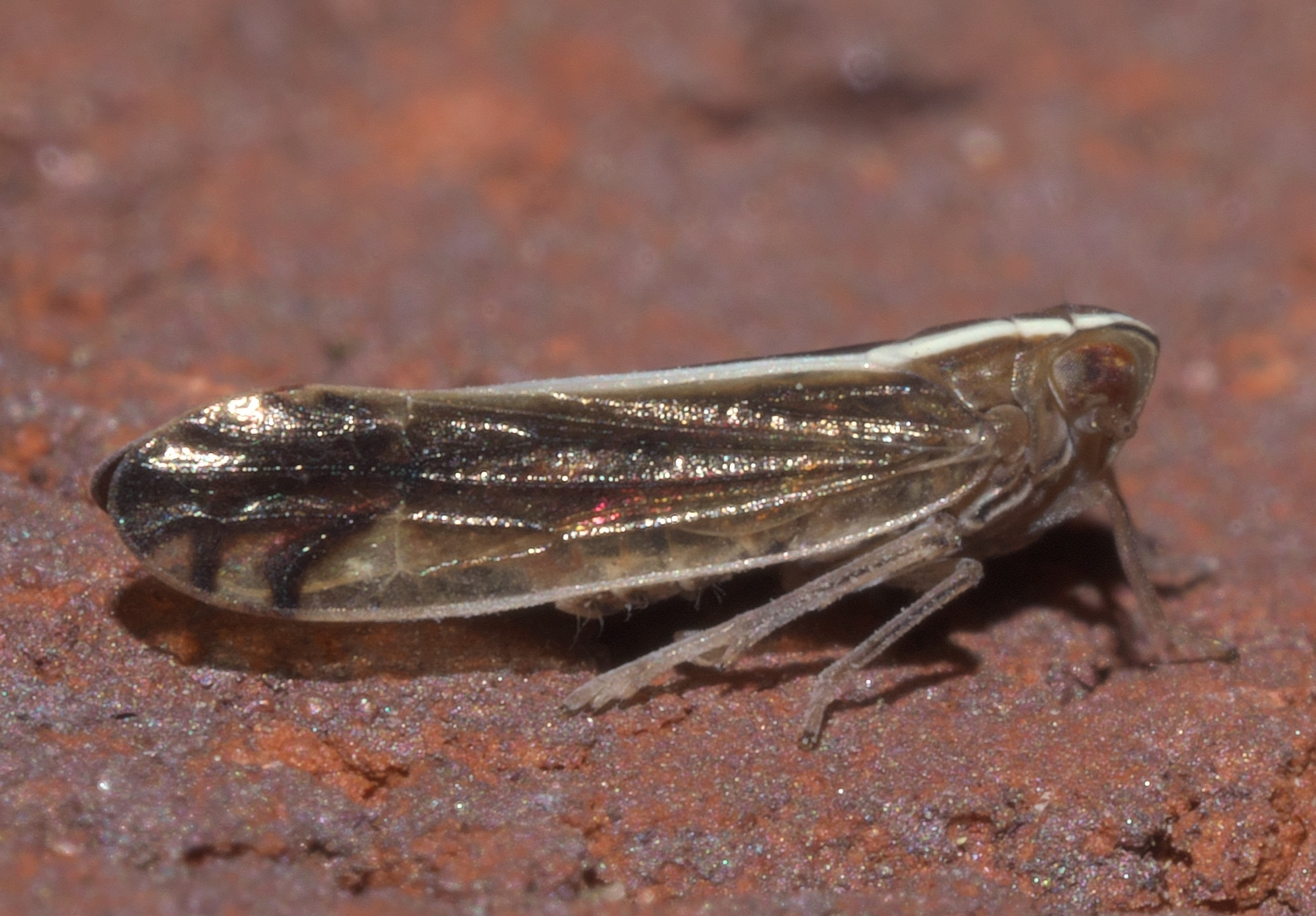
- Stenocranus vittatus, Oklahoma

Scientific classification
- Kingdom: Animalia
- Phylum: Arthropoda
- Clade: Pancrustacea
- Class: Insecta
- Order: Hemiptera
- Suborder: Auchenorrhyncha
- Infraorder: Fulgoromorpha
- Family: Delphacidae
- Genus: Stenocranus
- Species: S. vittatus

Binomial name
- Stenocranus vittatus (Stål, 1862)

= Stenocranus vittatus =

Species of true bug

Stenocranus vittatus is a species of delphacid planthopper in the family Delphacidae. It is found in North America.
