= List of Delphacodes species =

This is a list of more than 100 species in Delphacodes, a genus of delphacid planthoppers in the family Delphacidae.

== Delphacodes species ==
- Delphacodes aculeata Beamer, 1948
- Delphacodes acuministyla Dozier, 1926
- Delphacodes agropyri Ishihara, 1949
- Delphacodes amblystylis Fennah, 1956
- Delphacodes angulata Beamer, 1947
- Delphacodes anthracina (Horvath, 1909)
- Delphacodes anufrievi Wilson, 1992
- Delphacodes apicata Beamer, 1948
- Delphacodes arcuata Beamer, 1948
- Delphacodes argentina De Remes, Lenikov & Teson, 1979
- Delphacodes aterrima Muir, 1926
- Delphacodes atrior (Fowler, 1905)
- Delphacodes audrasi Ribaut, 1954
- Delphacodes axillaris (Sahlberg, 1876)
- Delphacodes balli Muir & Giffard, 1924
- Delphacodes banosensis Muir, 1926
- Delphacodes bellicosa Muir & Giffard, 1924
- Delphacodes bergi (Scott, 1881)
- Delphacodes bocana Beamer, 1946
- Delphacodes burjata (Kusnezov, 1929)
- Delphacodes caerulata Beamer, 1947
- Delphacodes capnodes (Scott, 1870) (Weißlippen-Spornzikade)
- Delphacodes carinata (Glover, 1877)
- Delphacodes catilina Fennah, 1958
- Delphacodes cayamensis (Crawford, 1914)
- Delphacodes celaeno Fennah, 1956
- Delphacodes cerberus Fennah, 1957
- Delphacodes chiloensis Muir, 1929
- Delphacodes choroebus Fennah, 1958
- Delphacodes conspicua (Horvath, 1904)
- Delphacodes culta (Van Duzee, 1907)
- Delphacodes curvistyla Dozier, 1926
- Delphacodes darwini Muir, 1929
- Delphacodes dentis Beamer, 1948
- Delphacodes detecta (Van Duzee, 1897)
- Delphacodes distanti Metcalf, 1943
- Delphacodes elongatus Teson, De Remes & Lenicov, 1983
- Delphacodes esakii Matsumura & Ishihara, 1945
- Delphacodes fascia (Lindberg, 1960)
- Delphacodes flava Metcalf, 1943
- Delphacodes flavida (Melichar, 1903)
- Delphacodes framarib Asche & Remane, 1983
- Delphacodes fukuokae Ishihara, 1949
- Delphacodes furcata (Provancher, 1872)
- Delphacodes fuscifrons (Fieber, 1879)
- Delphacodes gilveola (Kirschbaum, 1868)
- Delphacodes gluciophila Muir, 1926
- Delphacodes gracilis (Matsumura, 1915)
- Delphacodes graminis Lindberg, 1958
- Delphacodes hemiptera (Germar, 1818)
- Delphacodes indentistyla Dozier, 1926
- Delphacodes ixion Fennah, 1958
- Delphacodes kahavalu Kirkaldy, 1906
- Delphacodes koebelei Muir & Giffard, 1924
- Delphacodes kotonis (Matsumura, 1940)
- Delphacodes kuscheli Fennah, 1955
- Delphacodes lappae Beamer, 1946
- Delphacodes latifrons (Puton, 1875)
- Delphacodes latus De Remes, Lenikov & Teson, 1979
- Delphacodes leptypha (Amyot, 1847)
- Delphacodes linnavuori (Le Quense, 1960)
- Delphacodes livida Beamer, 1948
- Delphacodes marginalis (Motschulsky, 1863)
- Delphacodes marginicornis (Fowler, 1905)
- Delphacodes mcateei Muir & Giffard, 1924
- Delphacodes melanocephala (Fieber, 1879)
- Delphacodes mesada Caldwell, 1951
- Delphacodes modesta (Fieber, 1866)
- Delphacodes muirella Metcalf, 1943
- Delphacodes muirianus Izzard, 1936
- Delphacodes mulsanti (Fieber, 1866)
- Delphacodes nastasi Asche & Remane, 1983
- Delphacodes nigerrima Ishihara, 1949
- Delphacodes nigrinota Beamer, 1951
- Delphacodes nigripennata Beamer, 1946
- Delphacodes ornatipennis (Haupt, 1927)
- Delphacodes pacifica (Crawford, 1914)
- Delphacodes pallidula (Melichar, 1903)
- Delphacodes paludicola Muir, 1926
- Delphacodes parvistylus Muir, 1929
- Delphacodes patruelis (Stal, 1859)
- Delphacodes penepuella Beamer, 1948
- Delphacodes platystylus Muir, 1930
- Delphacodes quadridentis Beamer, 1948
- Delphacodes quadrispinosa Muir & Giffard, 1924
- Delphacodes radiata (Costa, 1834)
- Delphacodes rectangularis (Crawford, 1914)
- Delphacodes recurvata Beamer, 1948
- Delphacodes reducta (Van Duzee, 1907)
- Delphacodes rivularis (Germar, 1830)
- Delphacodes sabrina Fennah, 1958
- Delphacodes saccharicola Muir, 1926
- Delphacodes sagata (Fowler, 1905)
- Delphacodes saxicola Muir, 1926
- Delphacodes schinias Asche & Remane, 1983
- Delphacodes scolochloa Cronin & Wilson, 2007
- Delphacodes securigera Muir, 1926
- Delphacodes selkirki Fennah, 1955
- Delphacodes seminigra (Stal, 1854)
- Delphacodes semiobscura Metcalf, 1943
- Delphacodes shermani (Metcalf, 1923)
- Delphacodes silvae Beamer, 1946
- Delphacodes sitarea De Remes, Lenikov & Teson, 1979
- Delphacodes spinosus Teson & de Remes Lenicov, 1983
- Delphacodes staminata (Metcalf, 1923)
- Delphacodes stigmaticalis (Curtis, 1837)
- Delphacodes stricklandi Metcalf, 1946
- Delphacodes sucinea Beamer, 1948
- Delphacodes tapina (Fieber, 1866)
- Delphacodes thersander Fennah, 1956
- Delphacodes trimaculata Beamer, 1948
- Delphacodes truncata Beamer, 1948
- Delphacodes turgida Beamer, 1948
- Delphacodes uncinata (Fieber, 1866)
- Delphacodes unistrigosa (Motschulsky, 1863)
- Delphacodes univittata (Berg, 1879)
- Delphacodes venosus (Germar, 1830)
- Delphacodes waldeni (Metcalf, 1923)
- Delphacodes walkeri Metcalf, 1943
- Delphacodes xerophila Muir, 1926
