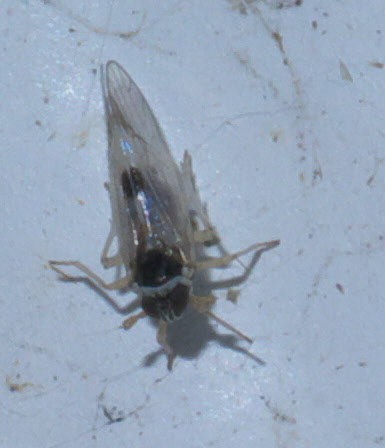

Scientific classification
- Domain: Eukaryota
- Kingdom: Animalia
- Phylum: Arthropoda
- Class: Insecta
- Order: Hemiptera
- Suborder: Auchenorrhyncha
- Infraorder: Fulgoromorpha
- Family: Delphacidae
- Genus: Chionomus
- Species: C. puellus

Binomial name
- Chionomus puellus (Van Duzee, 1897)

Synonyms
- Delphacodes puella (Van Duzee, 1897)

= Chionomus puellus =

Species of true bug

Chionomus puellus is a species of delphacid planthopper in the family Delphacidae. It is found in the Caribbean, Central America, North America, and South America.

This species was formerly a member of the genus Delphacodes. As a result of genomic research published in 2020, it was transferred to the genus Chionomus along with several other species.
