= Delphacodes recurvata =

Scientific classification
- Domain: Eukaryota
- Kingdom: Animalia
- Phylum: Arthropoda
- Class: Insecta
- Order: Hemiptera
- Suborder: Auchenorrhyncha
- Infraorder: Fulgoromorpha
- Family: Delphacidae
- Genus: Delphacodes
- Species: D. recurvata

Binomial name
- Delphacodes recurvata Beamer, 1948

Species of true bug

Delphacodes recurvata is a species of delphacid planthopper in the family Delphacidae. It is found in North America.
