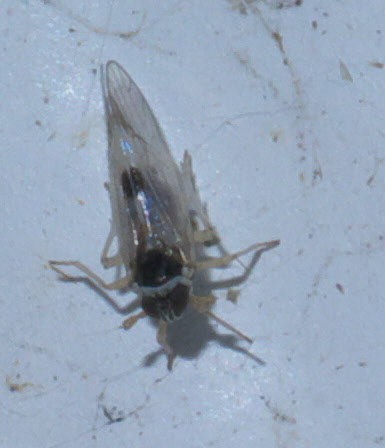
- Chionomus puellus, Oklahoma

Scientific classification
- Domain: Eukaryota
- Kingdom: Animalia
- Phylum: Arthropoda
- Class: Insecta
- Order: Hemiptera
- Suborder: Auchenorrhyncha
- Infraorder: Fulgoromorpha
- Family: Delphacidae
- Genus: Chionomus; Fennah, 1971

= Chionomus =

Genus of planthoppers

Chionomus is a genus of delphacid planthoppers in the family Delphacidae. There are about 14 described species in Chionomus. They are found in North, Central, and South America, including the Caribbean.

== Species ==
These species belong to the genus Chionomus:

- Chionomus balboae (Muir & Giffard, 1924)
- Chionomus banosensis (Muir, 1926)
- Chionomus bellicosus (Muir & Giffard, 1924)
- Chionomus cultus (Van Duzee, 1907)
- Chionomus dissipatus (Muir, 1926)
- Chionomus dolonus Weglarz & Bartlett 2020
- Chionomus gluciophilus (Muir, 1926)
- Chionomus havanae (Muir & Giffard, 1924)
- Chionomus haywardi (Muir, 1929)
- Chionomus herkos Weglarz & Bartlett 2020
- Chionomus pacificus (Crawford, 1914)
- Chionomus puellus (Van Duzee, 1897)
- Chionomus quadrispinosus (Muir & Giffard, 1924)
- Chionomus tenae (Muir, 1926)
