= Delphacodes =

Scientific classification
- Domain: Eukaryota
- Kingdom: Animalia
- Phylum: Arthropoda
- Class: Insecta
- Order: Hemiptera
- Suborder: Auchenorrhyncha
- Infraorder: Fulgoromorpha
- Family: Delphacidae
- Tribe: Delphacini
- Genus: Delphacodes; Fieber, 1866

Diversity
- more than 100 species

Genus of true bugs

Delphacodes is a genus of delphacid planthoppers in the family Delphacidae. There are more than 100 described species in Delphacodes, found worldwide.

== See also ==
- List of Delphacodes species
