= Kelisia axialis =

Scientific classification
- Domain: Eukaryota
- Kingdom: Animalia
- Phylum: Arthropoda
- Class: Insecta
- Order: Hemiptera
- Suborder: Auchenorrhyncha
- Infraorder: Fulgoromorpha
- Family: Delphacidae
- Genus: Kelisia
- Species: K. axialis

Binomial name
- Kelisia axialis Van Duzee, 1897

Species of true bug

Kelisia axialis is a species of delphacid planthopper in the family Delphacidae. It is found in North America.
