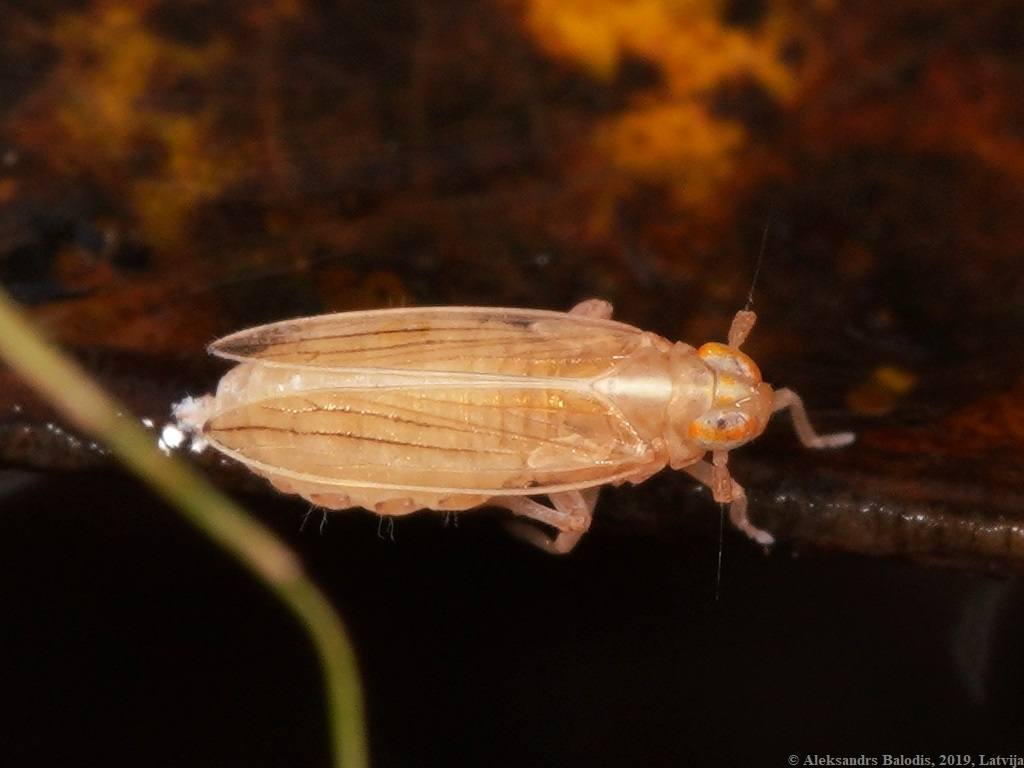
- Kelisia confusa

Scientific classification
- Domain: Eukaryota
- Kingdom: Animalia
- Phylum: Arthropoda
- Class: Insecta
- Order: Hemiptera
- Suborder: Auchenorrhyncha
- Infraorder: Fulgoromorpha
- Family: Delphacidae
- Subfamily: Kelisiinae
- Genus: Kelisia; Fieber, 1866

= Kelisia =

Genus of true bugs

Kelisia is a genus of delphacid planthoppers in the family Delphacidae. There are more than 50 described species in Kelisia.

== Species ==
These 56 species belong to the genus Kelisia:

- Kelisia asahinai Hori, 1982
- Kelisia axialis Van Duzee, 1897
- Kelisia bajancogta Dlabola, 1965
- Kelisia bellatula Ding & Zhang, 1994
- Kelisia bicarinata Haupt, 1935
- Kelisia bimaculata Beamer, 1945
- Kelisia bispinifera Dlabola, 1967
- Kelisia brucki Fieber, 1878
- Kelisia confusa Linnavuori, 1957
- Kelisia creticola Asche, 1982
- Kelisia curvata Beamer, 1945
- Kelisia flagellata Beamer, 1945
- Kelisia flava Beamer, 1951
- Kelisia gargano Asche, 1982
- Kelisia guttula (Germar, 1818)
- Kelisia guttulifera (Kirschbaum, 1868)
- Kelisia hagemini Remane & Jung, 1995
- Kelisia halpina Remane & Jung, 1995
- Kelisia haupti Wagner, 1939
- Kelisia henschii Horváth, 1897
- Kelisia hyalina Beamer, 1945
- Kelisia irregulata Haupt, 1935
- Kelisia italica Guglielmino & Remane, 2002
- Kelisia melanops Fieber, 1878
- Kelisia melanura Vilbaste, 1968
- Kelisia minima Ribaut, 1934
- Kelisia monoceros Ribaut, 1934
- Kelisia nervosa Vilbaste, 1972
- Kelisia nigripennis Muir, 1929
- Kelisia occirrega Remane & Guglielmino, 2002
- Kelisia orchonica Dlabola, 1970
- Kelisia pallidula (Boheman, 1847)
- Kelisia pannonica Matsumura, 1910
- Kelisia parvata Ball
- Kelisia parvicurvata Beamer, 1951
- Kelisia parvula Ball, 1902
- Kelisia pascuorum Ribaut, 1934
- Kelisia pectinata Beamer, 1945
- Kelisia perrieri Ribaut, 1934
- Kelisia praecox Haupt, 1935
- Kelisia punctulum (Kirschbaum, 1868)
- Kelisia retrorsa Beamer, 1945
- Kelisia ribauti Wagner, 1938
- Kelisia riboceros Asche, 1987
- Kelisia sabulicola Wagner, 1952
- Kelisia sima Ribaut, 1934
- Kelisia snelli Muir, 1925
- Kelisia spinosa Beamer, 1945
- Kelisia sulcata Ribaut, 1934
- Kelisia tarda Haupt, 1935
- Kelisia torquata Beamer, 1951
- Kelisia vesiculata Beamer, 1951
- Kelisia vittata Muir, 1926
- Kelisia vittipennis (Sahlberg, 1868)
- Kelisia xiphura Vilbaste, 1968
- Kelisia yarkonensis Linnavuori, 1962
