= Kelisia pectinata =

Scientific classification
- Domain: Eukaryota
- Kingdom: Animalia
- Phylum: Arthropoda
- Class: Insecta
- Order: Hemiptera
- Suborder: Auchenorrhyncha
- Infraorder: Fulgoromorpha
- Family: Delphacidae
- Genus: Kelisia
- Species: K. pectinata

Binomial name
- Kelisia pectinata Beamer, 1945

Species of true bug

Kelisia pectinata is a species of delphacid planthopper in the family Delphacidae. It is found in North America.
