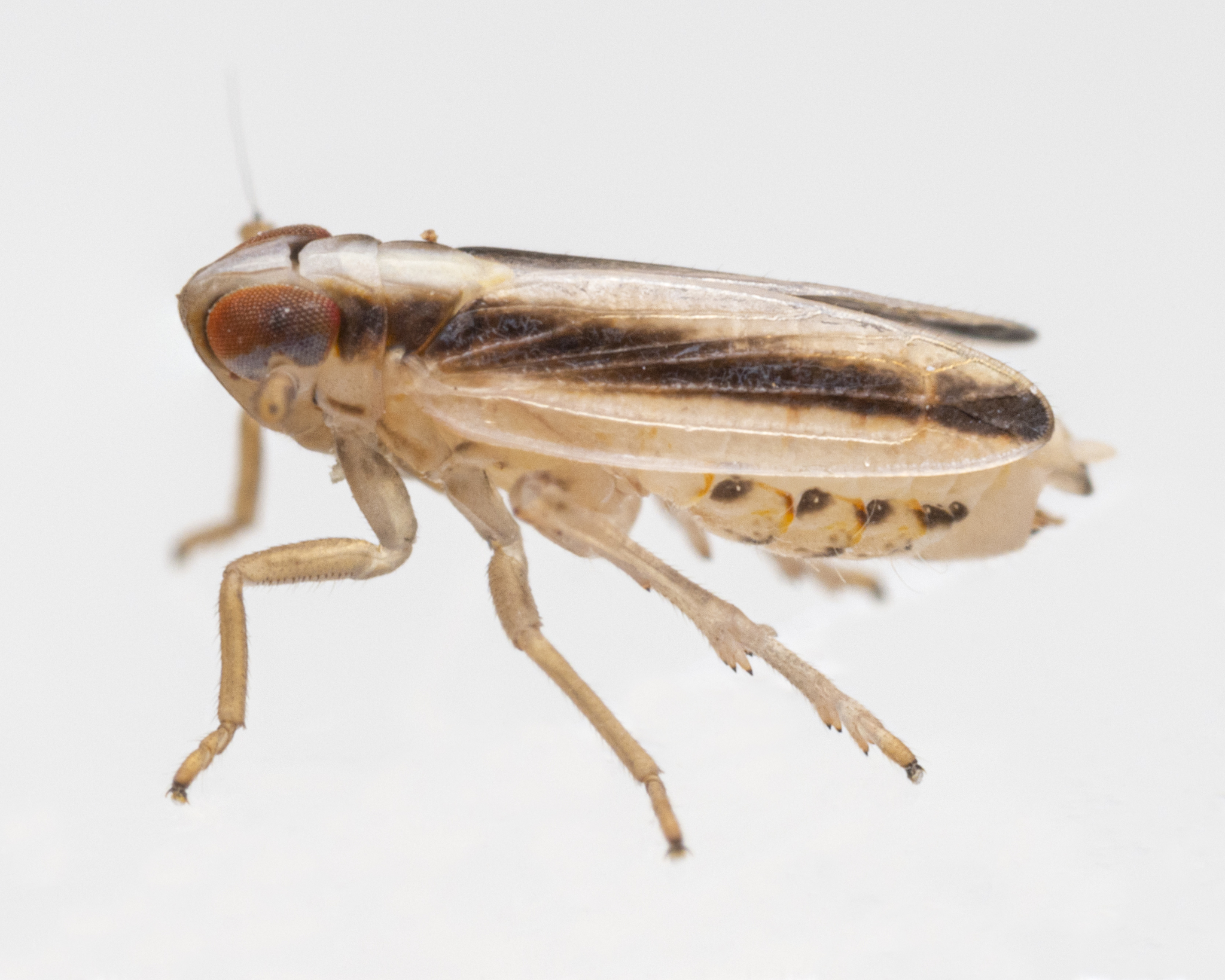

Scientific classification
- Kingdom: Animalia
- Phylum: Arthropoda
- Class: Insecta
- Order: Hemiptera
- Suborder: Auchenorrhyncha
- Infraorder: Fulgoromorpha
- Family: Delphacidae
- Genus: Kelisia
- Species: K. curvata

Binomial name
- Kelisia curvata Beamer, 1945

= Kelisia curvata =

Species of true bug

Kelisia curvata is a species of delphacid planthopper in the family Delphacidae. It is found in North America.
