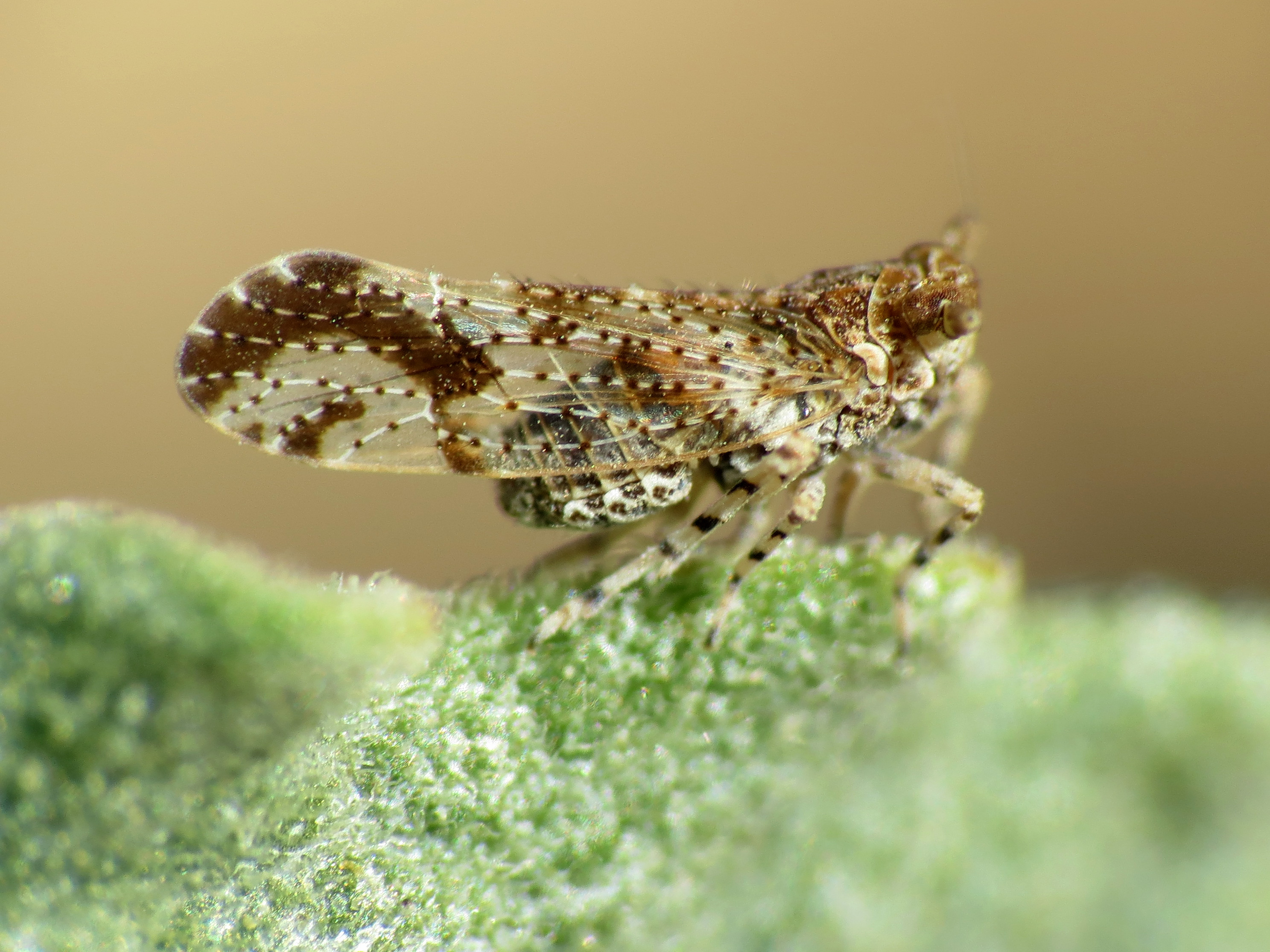

Scientific classification
- Kingdom: Animalia
- Phylum: Arthropoda
- Clade: Pancrustacea
- Class: Insecta
- Order: Hemiptera
- Suborder: Auchenorrhyncha
- Infraorder: Fulgoromorpha
- Family: Delphacidae
- Tribe: Delphacini
- Genus: Stobaera; Stål, 1859

= Stobaera =

Genus of true bugs

Stobaera is a genus of delphacid planthoppers in the family Delphacidae. There are about 14 described species in Stobaera.

== Species ==
These 14 species belong to the genus Stobaera:

- Stobaera affinis Van Duzee, 1909
- Stobaera azteca Muir, 1913
- Stobaera biblobata Van Duzee, 1914
- Stobaera bilobata Van Duzee, 1914
- Stobaera caldwelli Kramer, 1974
- Stobaera concinna (Stål, 1859)
- Stobaera giffardi Van Duzee, 1917
- Stobaera granulosa (Fowler, 1905)
- Stobaera koebeli Muir, 1913
- Stobaera minuta Osborn, 1905
- Stobaera muiri Kramer, 1974
- Stobaera nigripennis Crawford, 1914
- Stobaera pallida Osborn, 1905
- Stobaera tricarinata (Say, 1825)
