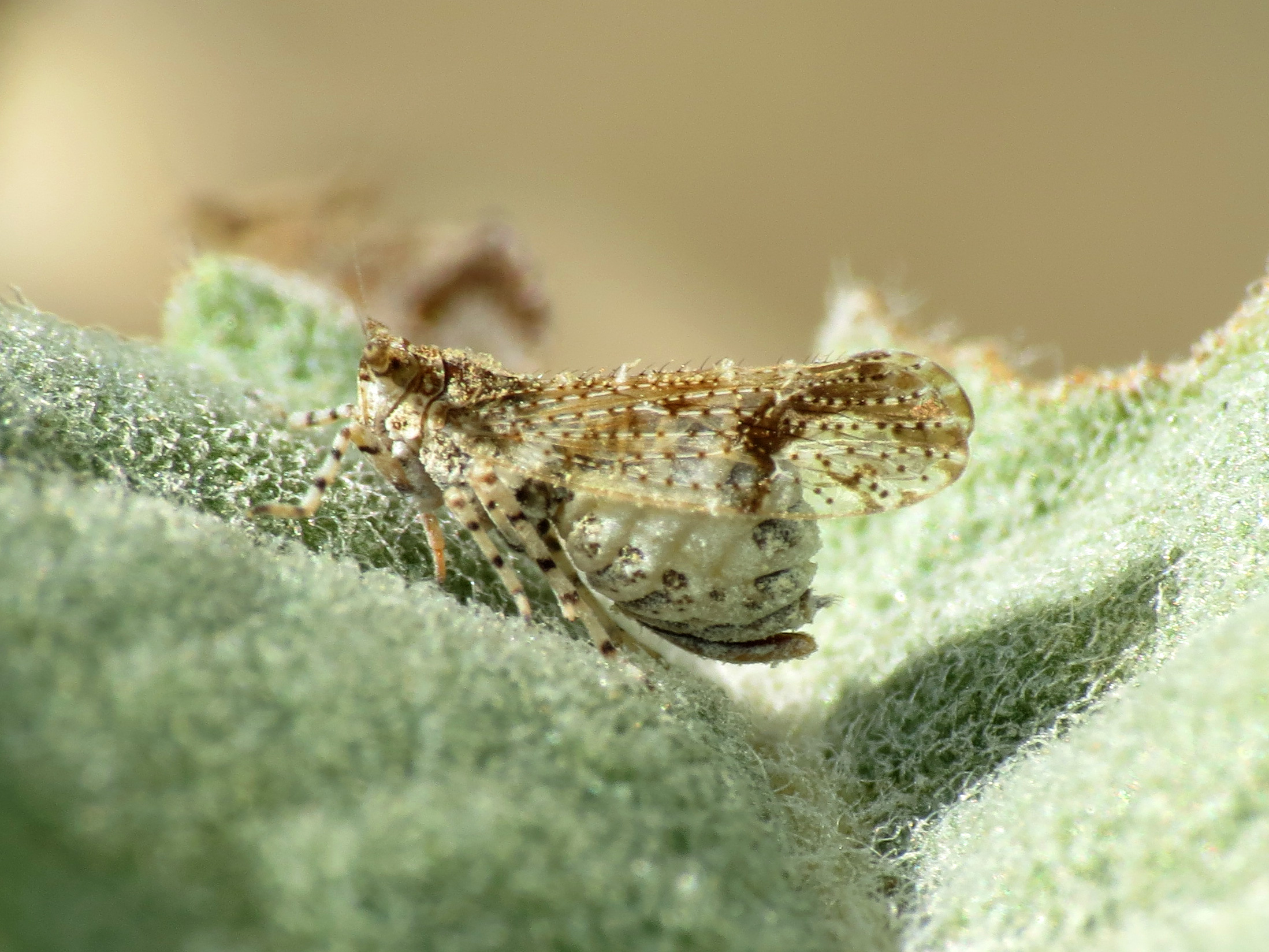
- Stobaera pallida on Ambrosia ambrosioides. King Canyon Wash, Tucson Mountains, Saguaro National Park West, Tucson, Arizona, USA.

Scientific classification
- Domain: Eukaryota
- Kingdom: Animalia
- Phylum: Arthropoda
- Class: Insecta
- Order: Hemiptera
- Suborder: Auchenorrhyncha
- Infraorder: Fulgoromorpha
- Family: Delphacidae
- Genus: Stobaera
- Species: S. pallida

Binomial name
- Stobaera pallida Osborn, 1905

= Stobaera pallida =

Species of true bug

Stobaera pallida is a species of delphacid planthopper in the family Delphacidae. It is found in Central America and North America.
