= Stobaera concinna =

Scientific classification
- Kingdom: Animalia
- Phylum: Arthropoda
- Clade: Pancrustacea
- Class: Insecta
- Order: Hemiptera
- Suborder: Auchenorrhyncha
- Infraorder: Fulgoromorpha
- Family: Delphacidae
- Genus: Stobaera
- Species: S. concinna

Binomial name
- Stobaera concinna (Stål, 1859)

Species of true bug

Stobaera concinna is a species of delphacid planthopper in the family Delphacidae. It is found in the Caribbean, Central America, and North America.
