= Stobaera caldwelli =

Scientific classification
- Domain: Eukaryota
- Kingdom: Animalia
- Phylum: Arthropoda
- Class: Insecta
- Order: Hemiptera
- Suborder: Auchenorrhyncha
- Infraorder: Fulgoromorpha
- Family: Delphacidae
- Genus: Stobaera
- Species: S. caldwelli

Binomial name
- Stobaera caldwelli Kramer, 1974

Species of true bug

Stobaera caldwelli is a species of delphacid planthopper in the family Delphacidae. It is found in Central America and North America.
