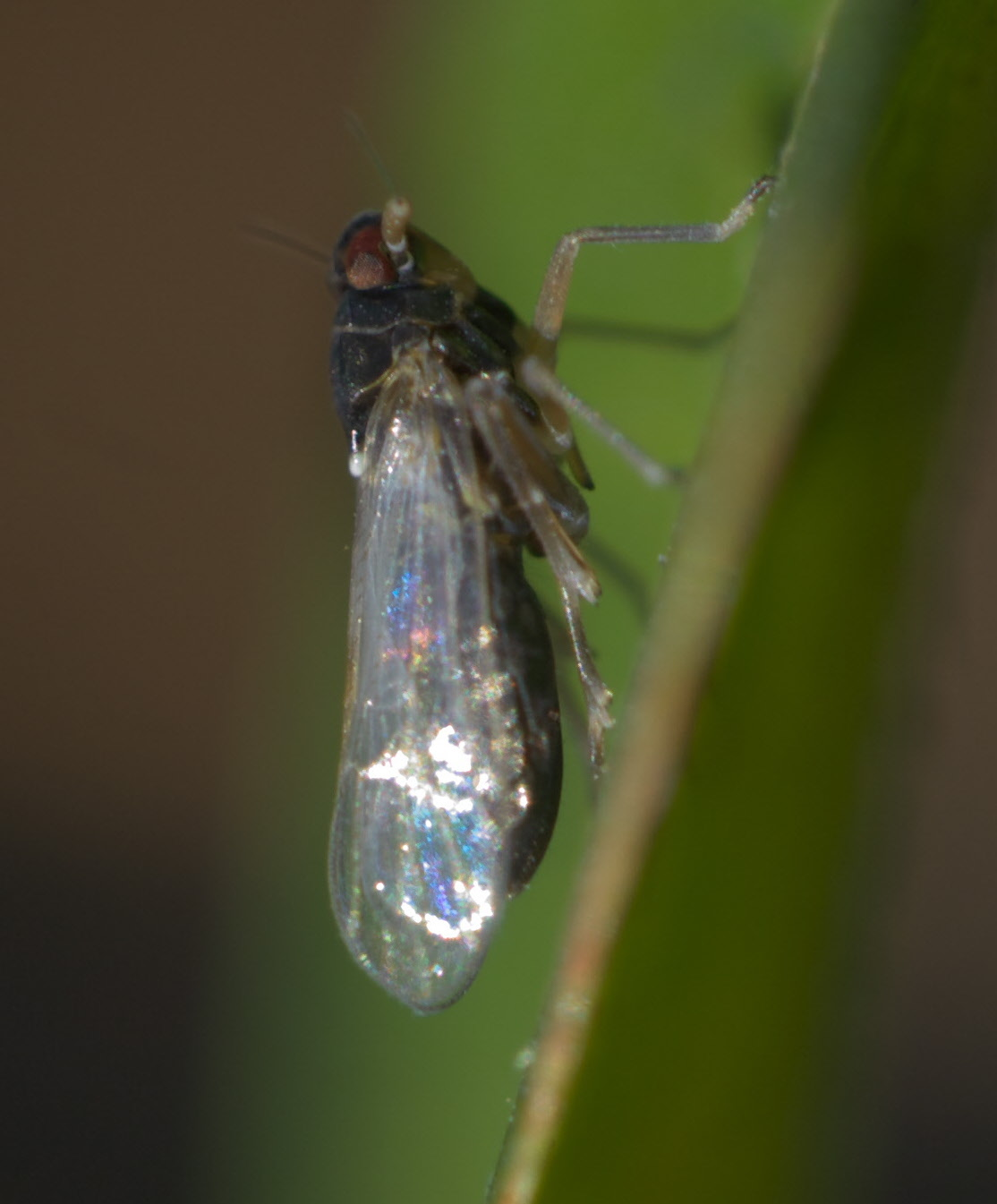

Scientific classification
- Domain: Eukaryota
- Kingdom: Animalia
- Phylum: Arthropoda
- Class: Insecta
- Order: Hemiptera
- Suborder: Auchenorrhyncha
- Infraorder: Fulgoromorpha
- Family: Delphacidae
- Genus: Isodelphax
- Species: I. basivitta

Binomial name
- Isodelphax basivitta (Van Duzee, 1909)

= Isodelphax basivitta =

Species of true bug

Isodelphax basivitta is a species of delphacid planthopper in the family Delphacidae. It is found in North America.

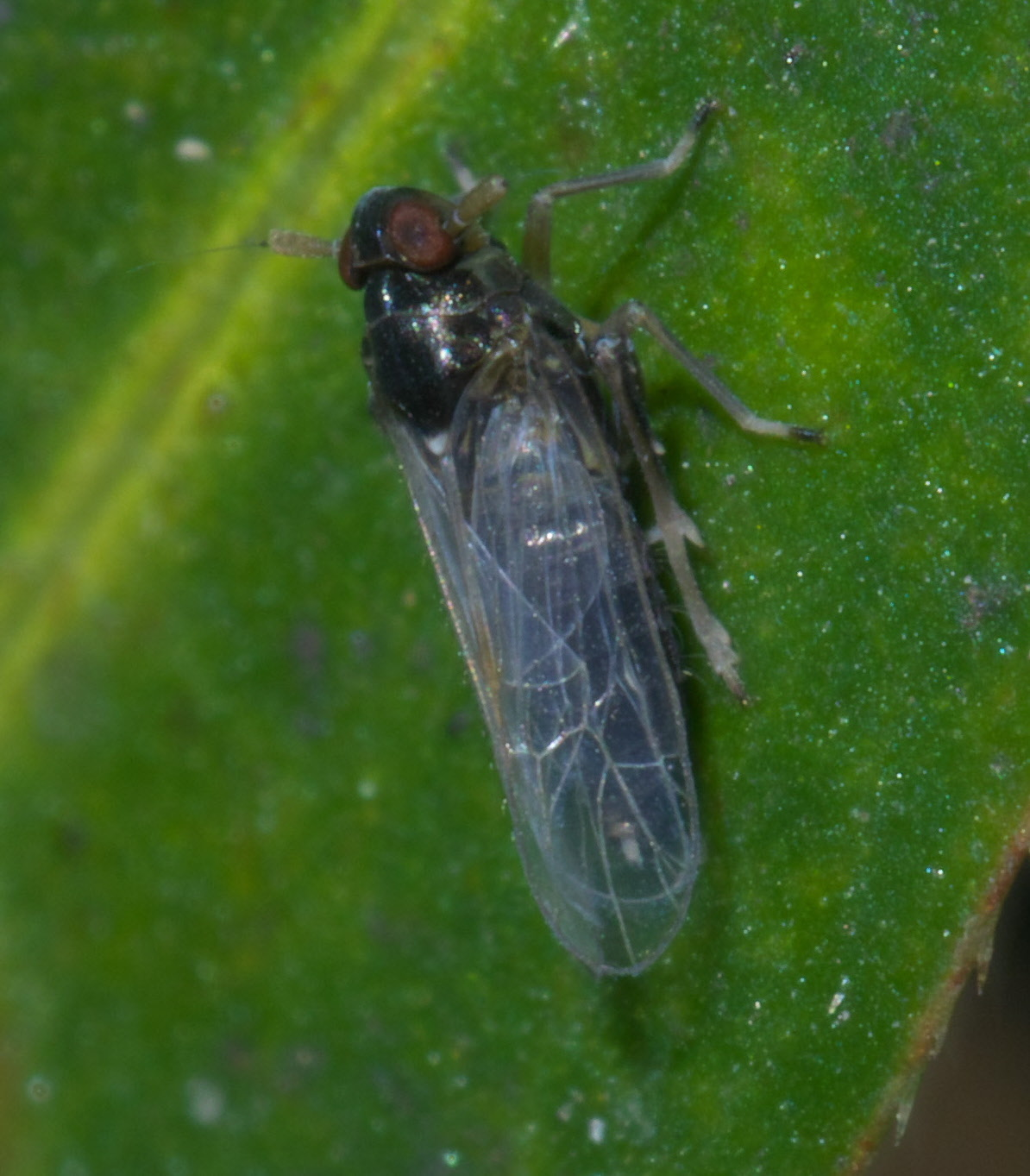
Isodelphax basivitta, Pryor, OK, USA
