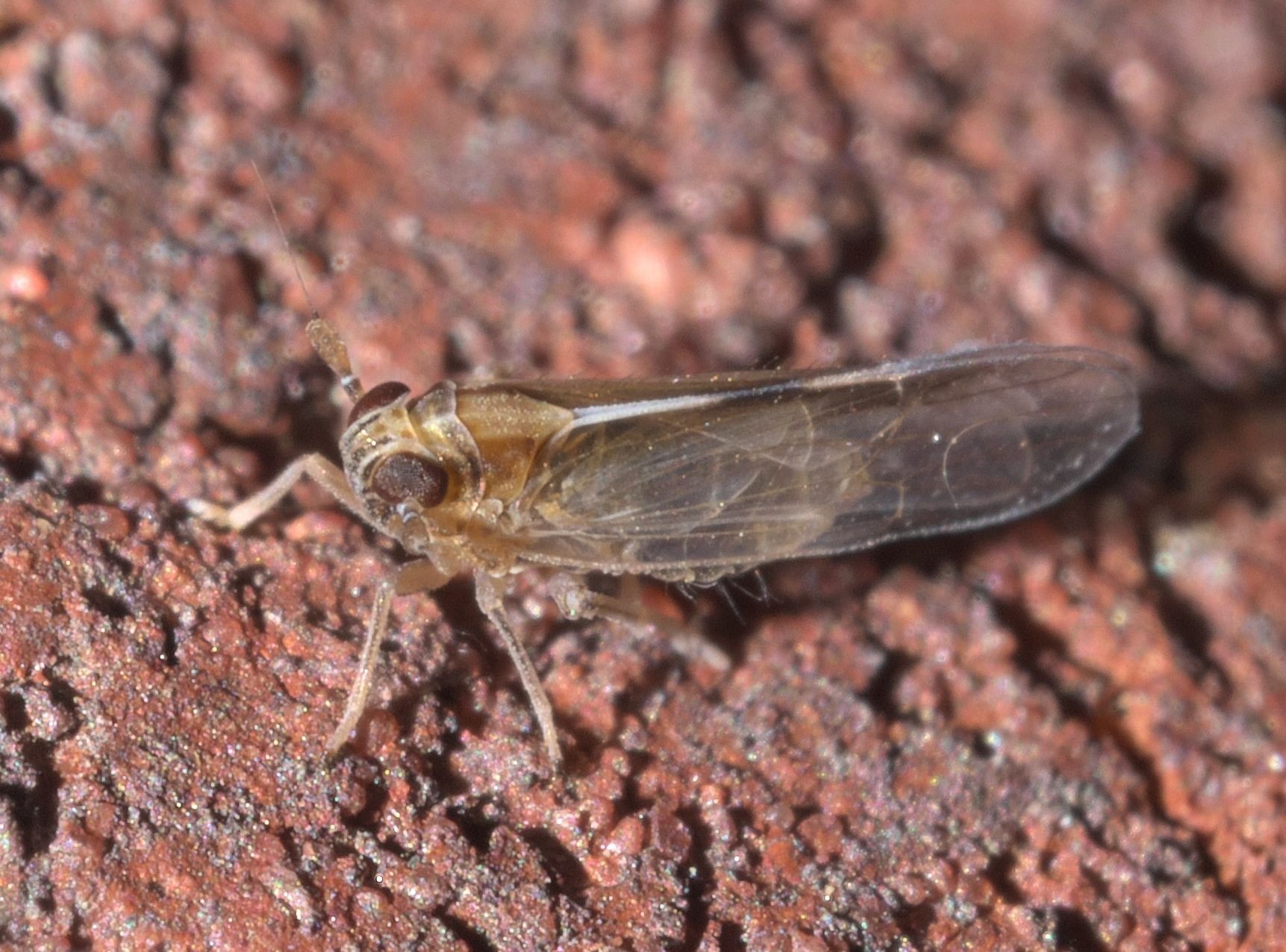
- Muellerianella laminalis, Oklahoma

Scientific classification
- Domain: Eukaryota
- Kingdom: Animalia
- Phylum: Arthropoda
- Class: Insecta
- Order: Hemiptera
- Suborder: Auchenorrhyncha
- Infraorder: Fulgoromorpha
- Family: Delphacidae
- Genus: Muellerianella
- Species: M. laminalis

Binomial name
- Muellerianella laminalis (Van Duzee, 1897)

= Muellerianella laminalis =

Species of true bug

Muellerianella laminalis is a species of delphacid planthopper in the family Delphacidae. It is found in the Caribbean and North America.
