= Syndelphax =

Scientific classification
- Domain: Eukaryota
- Kingdom: Animalia
- Phylum: Arthropoda
- Class: Insecta
- Order: Hemiptera
- Suborder: Auchenorrhyncha
- Infraorder: Fulgoromorpha
- Family: Delphacidae
- Subfamily: Delphacinae
- Genus: Syndelphax; Fennah, 1963

Genus of true bugs

Syndelphax is a genus of planthoppers in the family Delphacidae, comprising 19 species:

- Syndelphax agametor Fennah, 1975
- Syndelphax alexanderi (Metcalf, 1923)
- Syndelphax capellana (Jacobi, 1917)
- Syndelphax capellanus (Jacobi, 1917)
- Syndelphax disonymos (Kirkaldy, 1907)
- Syndelphax disonymus (Kirkaldy, 1907)
- Syndelphax dissipatus (Muir, 1926)
- Syndelphax dolosa (Muir, 1926)
- Syndelphax euonymus (Fennah, 1965)
- Syndelphax euroclydon Fennah, 1975
- Syndelphax fallax (Muir, 1926)
- Syndelphax floridae (Muir & Giffard, 1924)
- Syndelphax fulvidorsum (Metcalf, 1923)
- Syndelphax humilis (Van Duzee, 1907)
- Syndelphax matanitu (Kirkaldy, 1907)
- Syndelphax nigripennis (Crawford, 1914)
- Syndelphax pero Fennah, 1971
- Syndelphax pseudoseminiger (Muir & Giffard, 1924)
- Syndelphax pseudoseminigra (St. Augustine grass planthopper)
