= Syndelphax alexanderi =

Scientific classification
- Domain: Eukaryota
- Kingdom: Animalia
- Phylum: Arthropoda
- Class: Insecta
- Order: Hemiptera
- Suborder: Auchenorrhyncha
- Infraorder: Fulgoromorpha
- Family: Delphacidae
- Genus: Syndelphax
- Species: S. alexanderi

Binomial name
- Syndelphax alexanderi (Metcalf, 1923)

Synonyms
- Delphacodes uhleri Muir and Giffard, 1924

Species of true bug

Syndelphax alexanderi is a species of delphacid planthopper in the family Delphacidae. It is found in North America.
