= Syndelphax fulvidorsum =

Scientific classification
- Domain: Eukaryota
- Kingdom: Animalia
- Phylum: Arthropoda
- Class: Insecta
- Order: Hemiptera
- Suborder: Auchenorrhyncha
- Infraorder: Fulgoromorpha
- Family: Delphacidae
- Genus: Syndelphax
- Species: S. fulvidorsum

Binomial name
- Syndelphax fulvidorsum (Metcalf, 1923)

Species of true bug

Syndelphax fulvidorsum is a species of delphacid planthopper in the family Delphacidae. It is found in the Caribbean and North America.
