= Laccocera =

Scientific classification
- Domain: Eukaryota
- Kingdom: Animalia
- Phylum: Arthropoda
- Class: Insecta
- Order: Hemiptera
- Suborder: Auchenorrhyncha
- Infraorder: Fulgoromorpha
- Family: Delphacidae
- Subfamily: Delphacinae
- Genus: Laccocera; Van Duzee, 1897

Genus of true bugs

Laccocera is a genus of delphacid planthoppers in the family Delphacidae. There are about 10 described species in Laccocera.

== Species ==
These 10 species belong to the genus Laccocera:

- Laccocera bicornata Crawford, 1914
- Laccocera canadensis Beirne, 1950
- Laccocera flava Crawford, 1914
- Laccocera lineata Scudder, 1963
- Laccocera minuta Penner, 1945
- Laccocera obesa Van Duzee, 1897
- Laccocera oregonensis Penner, 1945
- Laccocera vanduzeei Penner, 1945
- Laccocera vittipennis Van Duzee, 1897
- Laccocera zonata (Van Duzee, 1897)
