= Laccocera flava =

Scientific classification
- Domain: Eukaryota
- Kingdom: Animalia
- Phylum: Arthropoda
- Class: Insecta
- Order: Hemiptera
- Suborder: Auchenorrhyncha
- Infraorder: Fulgoromorpha
- Family: Delphacidae
- Genus: Laccocera
- Species: L. flava

Binomial name
- Laccocera flava Crawford, 1914

Species of true bug

Laccocera flava is a species of delphacid planthopper in the family Delphacidae. It is found in North America.
