= Tumidagena =

Scientific classification
- Domain: Eukaryota
- Kingdom: Animalia
- Phylum: Arthropoda
- Class: Insecta
- Order: Hemiptera
- Suborder: Auchenorrhyncha
- Infraorder: Fulgoromorpha
- Family: Delphacidae
- Tribe: Delphacini
- Genus: Tumidagena; McDermott, 1952

Genus of true bugs

Tumidagena is a genus of delphacid planthoppers in the family Delphacidae. There are at least three described species in Tumidagena.

== Species ==
These three species belong to the genus Tumidagena:

- Tumidagena minuta McDermott, 1952
- Tumidagena propinqua McDermott, 1952
- Tumidagena terminalis (Metcalf, 1923)
