= Tumidagena terminalis =

Scientific classification
- Domain: Eukaryota
- Kingdom: Animalia
- Phylum: Arthropoda
- Class: Insecta
- Order: Hemiptera
- Suborder: Auchenorrhyncha
- Infraorder: Fulgoromorpha
- Family: Delphacidae
- Genus: Tumidagena
- Species: T. terminalis

Binomial name
- Tumidagena terminalis (Metcalf, 1923)

Species of true bug

Tumidagena terminalis is a species of delphacid planthopper in the family Delphacidae. It is found in North America.
