= Phrictopyga =

Scientific classification
- Domain: Eukaryota
- Kingdom: Animalia
- Phylum: Arthropoda
- Class: Insecta
- Order: Hemiptera
- Suborder: Auchenorrhyncha
- Infraorder: Fulgoromorpha
- Family: Delphacidae
- Subfamily: Delphacinae
- Genus: Phrictopyga; Caldwell in Caldwell & Martorell, 1951

Genus of true bugs

Phrictopyga is a genus of delphacid planthoppers in the family Delphacidae. There are about 12 described species in Phrictopyga.

== Species ==
These 12 species belong to the genus Phrictopyga:

- Phrictopyga contorta (Muir, 1926)
- Phrictopyga curvistilus (Muir, 1926)
- Phrictopyga escadensis (Muir, 1926)
- Phrictopyga fuscovittata (Muir, 1926)
- Phrictopyga graminicola (Muir, 1926)
- Phrictopyga holmgreni (Muir, 1930)
- Phrictopyga nugax Fennah, 1959
- Phrictopyga occidentalis (Muir, 1926)
- Phrictopyga parvula (Osborn, 1926)
- Phrictopyga semele Fennah, 1959
- Phrictopyga urbana (Muir, 1926)
- Phrictopyga vittata (Muir, 1926)
