= Phyllodinus =

Scientific classification
- Kingdom: Animalia
- Phylum: Arthropoda
- Class: Insecta
- Order: Hemiptera
- Suborder: Auchenorrhyncha
- Infraorder: Fulgoromorpha
- Family: Delphacidae
- Subfamily: Delphacinae
- Genus: Phyllodinus; Van Duzee, 1897

Genus of true bugs

Phyllodinus is a genus of delphacid planthoppers in the family Delphacidae. There are about six described species in Phyllodinus.

== Species ==
These six species belong to the genus Phyllodinus:

- Phyllodinus affinis (Schumacher, 1915)
- Phyllodinus albofasciatus Muir, 1929
- Phyllodinus aritainoides (Schumacher, 1915)
- Phyllodinus kotoshonis (Matsumura, 1940)
- Phyllodinus luzonensis Muir, 1916
- Phyllodinus nervatus Van Duzee, 1897
