= Pygospina spinata =

Scientific classification
- Domain: Eukaryota
- Kingdom: Animalia
- Phylum: Arthropoda
- Class: Insecta
- Order: Hemiptera
- Suborder: Auchenorrhyncha
- Infraorder: Fulgoromorpha
- Family: Delphacidae
- Genus: Pygospina
- Species: P. spinata

Binomial name
- Pygospina spinata Caldwell in Caldwell & Martorell, 1951

Species of true bug

Pygospina spinata is a species of delphacid planthopper in the family Delphacidae. It is found in the Caribbean and North America.
