= Pygospina =

Scientific classification
- Domain: Eukaryota
- Kingdom: Animalia
- Phylum: Arthropoda
- Class: Insecta
- Order: Hemiptera
- Suborder: Auchenorrhyncha
- Infraorder: Fulgoromorpha
- Family: Delphacidae
- Subfamily: Delphacinae
- Genus: Pygospina; Caldwell in Caldwell & Martorell, 1951

Genus of true bugs

Pygospina is a genus of delphacid planthoppers in the family Delphacidae. There are about five described species in Pygospina.

== Species ==
These five species belong to the genus Pygospina:

- Pygospina aurantii (Crawford, 1914)
- Pygospina reducta Caldwell in Caldwell & Martorell, 1951
- Pygospina rezendensis (Muir, 1926)
- Pygospina spinata Caldwell in Caldwell & Martorell, 1951
- Pygospina spinigera (Fennah, 1945)
