= Pareuidella weedi =

Scientific classification
- Domain: Eukaryota
- Kingdom: Animalia
- Phylum: Arthropoda
- Class: Insecta
- Order: Hemiptera
- Suborder: Auchenorrhyncha
- Infraorder: Fulgoromorpha
- Family: Delphacidae
- Genus: Pareuidella
- Species: P. weedi

Binomial name
- Pareuidella weedi (Van Duzee, 1897)

Species of true bug

Pareuidella weedi is a species of delphacid planthopper in the family Delphacidae. It is found in the Caribbean Sea, Central America, and North America.
