= Pareuidella =

Scientific classification
- Domain: Eukaryota
- Kingdom: Animalia
- Phylum: Arthropoda
- Class: Insecta
- Order: Hemiptera
- Suborder: Auchenorrhyncha
- Infraorder: Fulgoromorpha
- Family: Delphacidae
- Subfamily: Delphacinae
- Genus: Pareuidella; Beamer, 1951

Genus of true bugs

Pareuidella is a genus of delphacid planthoppers in the family Delphacidae. There are about five described species in Pareuidella.

== Species ==
These five species belong to the genus Pareuidella:

- Pareuidella avicephaliforma Beamer, 1951
- Pareuidella magnistyla (Crawford, 1914)
- Pareuidella spatulata Beamer, 1951
- Pareuidella triloba (Metcalf, 1923)
- Pareuidella weedi (Van Duzee, 1897)
