= Criomorphus inconspicuus =

Scientific classification
- Domain: Eukaryota
- Kingdom: Animalia
- Phylum: Arthropoda
- Class: Insecta
- Order: Hemiptera
- Suborder: Auchenorrhyncha
- Infraorder: Fulgoromorpha
- Family: Delphacidae
- Genus: Criomorphus
- Species: C. inconspicuus

Binomial name
- Criomorphus inconspicuus (Uhler, 1877)

Species of true bug

Criomorphus inconspicuus is a species of delphacid planthopper in the family Delphacidae. It is found in North America.
