= Paraliburnia kilmani =

Scientific classification
- Domain: Eukaryota
- Kingdom: Animalia
- Phylum: Arthropoda
- Class: Insecta
- Order: Hemiptera
- Suborder: Auchenorrhyncha
- Infraorder: Fulgoromorpha
- Family: Delphacidae
- Genus: Paraliburnia
- Species: P. kilmani

Binomial name
- Paraliburnia kilmani (Van Duzee, 1897)

Species of true bug

Paraliburnia kilmani is a species of delphacid planthopper in the family Delphacidae. It is found in North America.
