= Toya idonea =

Scientific classification
- Domain: Eukaryota
- Kingdom: Animalia
- Phylum: Arthropoda
- Class: Insecta
- Order: Hemiptera
- Suborder: Auchenorrhyncha
- Infraorder: Fulgoromorpha
- Family: Delphacidae
- Genus: Toya
- Species: T. idonea

Binomial name
- Toya idonea (Beamer, 1947)

Species of true bug

Toya idonea is a species of delphacid planthopper in the family Delphacidae. It is found in the Caribbean, Central America, North America, and South America.
