= Aesculus (Carnea Group) 'Pendula' =

Weeping tree cultivar

- Genus: Aesculus
- Species: Aesculus (Carnea Group)
- Cultivar: 'Pendula'
- Origin: England

Aesculus (Carnea Group) 'Pendula', or Weeping Red Horse Chestnut, is a weeping tree and a cultivar of the Aesculus Carnea Group, the Red Horse Chestnut Group, which is a cultivar group of artificial hybrids between Aesculus pavia and A. hippocastanum. The name first appeared in the 1902 edition of the Hand-list of Trees and Shrubs of the Royal Botanic Gardens, Kew without description. A few specimens of this cultivar are now known to survive.

== Description ==
A weeping tree with a leader and with arching branches. Young plants are reported not to be weeping. The weeping shape only seems to appear when older. It may be that this is not a true weeping cultivar as older Horse Chestnuts often display arching branches.

== Accessions ==
This cultivar was previously recorded as not having been cultivated outside of England, but they now appear to have been thriving all these years in the Tayside Region of Scotland. They do not seem to have been widely cultivated, but more than 10 of these trees are now known to have survived ( the first being recognised/rediscovered on 18 September 2020 in Arbroath.) [2]

== Synonymy ==
- Aesculus × carnea var. pendulum A.Henry (1907)
