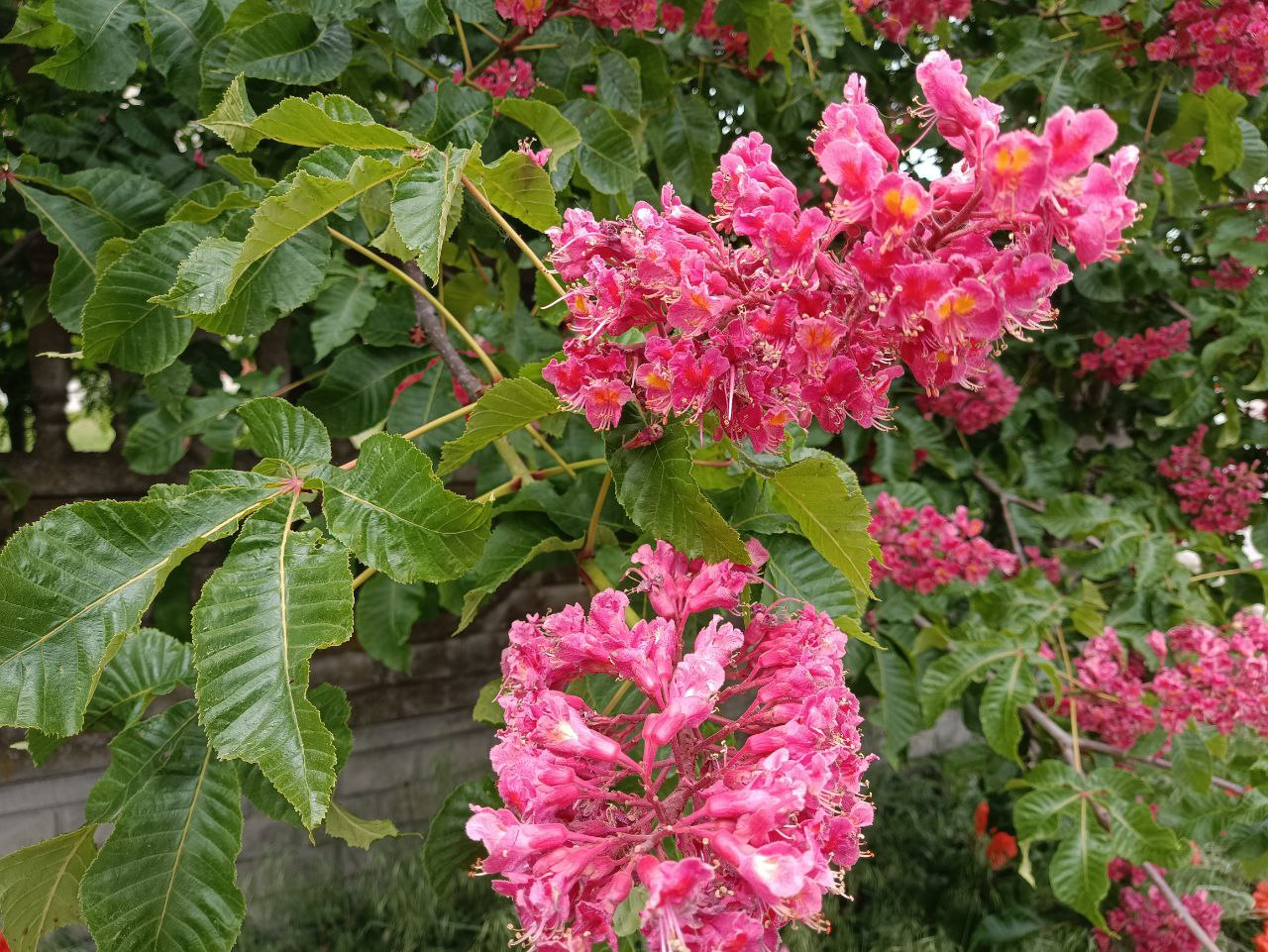

Scientific classification
- Kingdom: Plantae
- Clade: Tracheophytes
- Clade: Angiosperms
- Clade: Eudicots
- Clade: Rosids
- Order: Sapindales
- Family: Sapindaceae
- Genus: Aesculus
- Species: A. × carnea

Binomial name
- Aesculus × carnea Zeyh.

= Aesculus × carnea =

Species of flowering plant

Aesculus × carnea, or red horse-chestnut, is a medium-sized tree, an artificial hybrid between Aesculus hippocastanum (European horse-chestnut) and Aesculus pavia (red buckeye). Its exact origin is uncertain, arising in Germany around 1818. It is a popular tree in large gardens and parks, widely planted throughout Europe.

It is a tetraploid plant, arising from autopolyploidy with chromosome doubling of its diploid parent species. The result of this is that it is fertile, producing viable seeds that breed true, the progeny identical or near-identical to the parent tree. It is locally naturalised in England, and more rarely so in Ireland, Scotland, and Wales.

Aesculus × carnea has features typically intermediate between the parent species, but it inherits the red flowers of Ae. pavia. It grows to 15–25 metres (49–82 ft) tall, rarely to 28 metres (92 ft), with a trunk diameter of up to 1 m and a rounded crown that casts dense shade when mature. The leaves are deciduous, dark green, coarse and often rough and wrinkled or irregular; they are palmately compound, each leaf divided into five large, toothed leaflets; the central leaflet the largest, up to 25 cm long. The autumn colour is very poor. The flowers are dull red, borne on 12–20 cm long panicles on branch ends, flowering in May and producing pale brown leathery fruit capsules 4 cm diameter containing 1–3 seeds in autumn.

It is very vulnerable to a canker disease on the trunk and branches, which results in heavily disfigured bark, and often a short lifespan for the trees. It has no known causal agent, and may be due to the abnormal development and breakup of its cells with age. (Note: This disease is not the Bleeding canker of horse-chestnut that has recently become prevalent in Europe, long after Bean and Mitchell mentioned the canker) The cultivar 'Briotii' is less affected than the species generally.

== Cultivars ==
- 'Briotii' (named in 1858 after Pierre Louis Briot (1804–1888), the chief horticulturist of the State gardens at Trianon-Versailles near Paris, France). This is the most commonly seen cultivar; it has brighter red flowers, and matures as a smaller tree. It is propagated by grafting.
- 'O'Neil', which produce larger panicles with brighter red flowers.
- 'Fort McNair' (named from Fort Lesley J. McNair, where it was selected) it has dark pink flowers with yellow throats and resists leaf scorch and leaf blotch.
- 'Pendula' with arching branches.
- 'Plantierensis' which has paler rose-pink flowers with yellow throats. It is a sterile triploid back-cross hybrid between Ae. × carnea and Ae. hippocastanum, so does not set fruit.

== Gallery ==
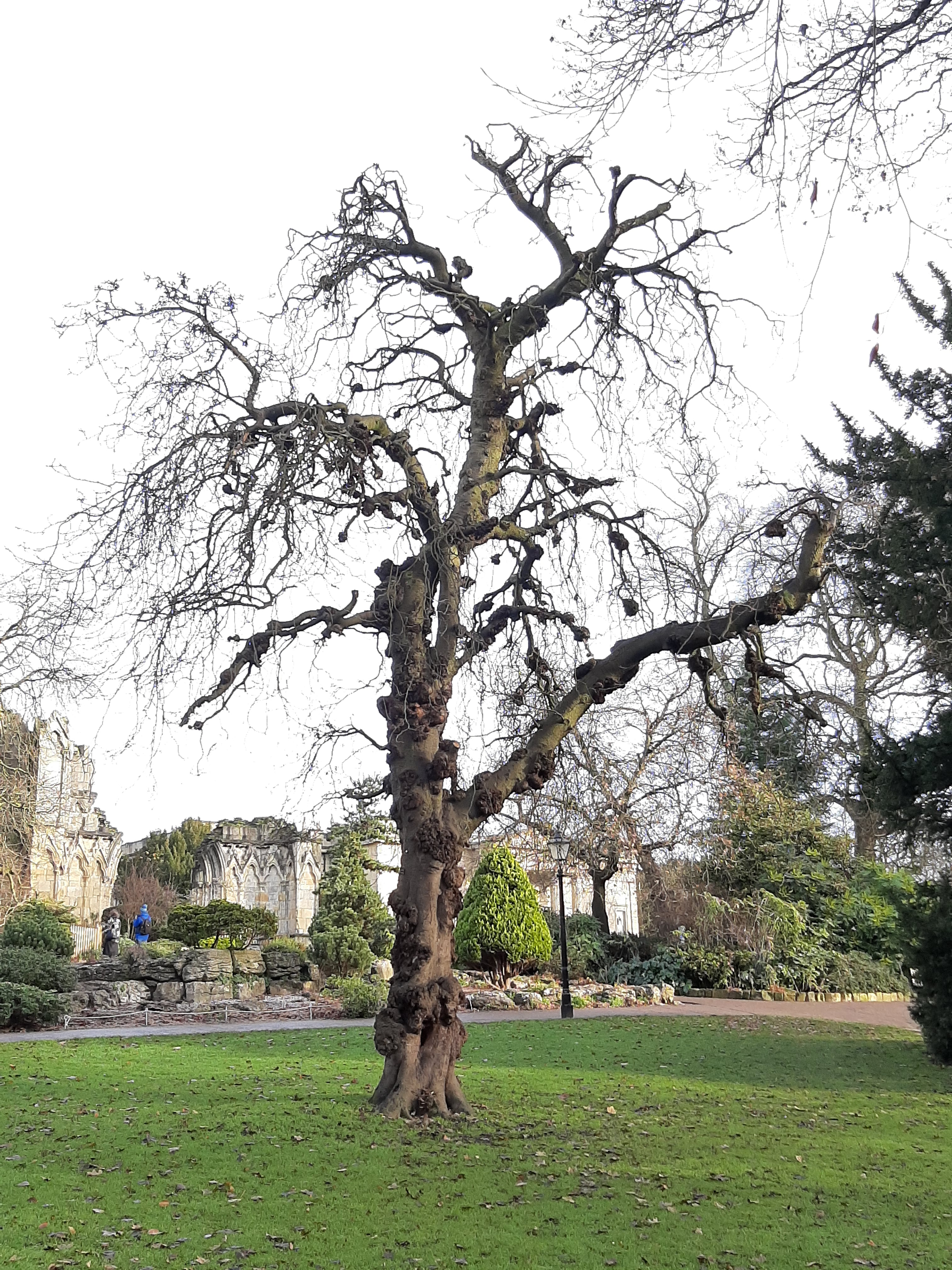
Tree in York in winter, showing the typically heavily cankered bark

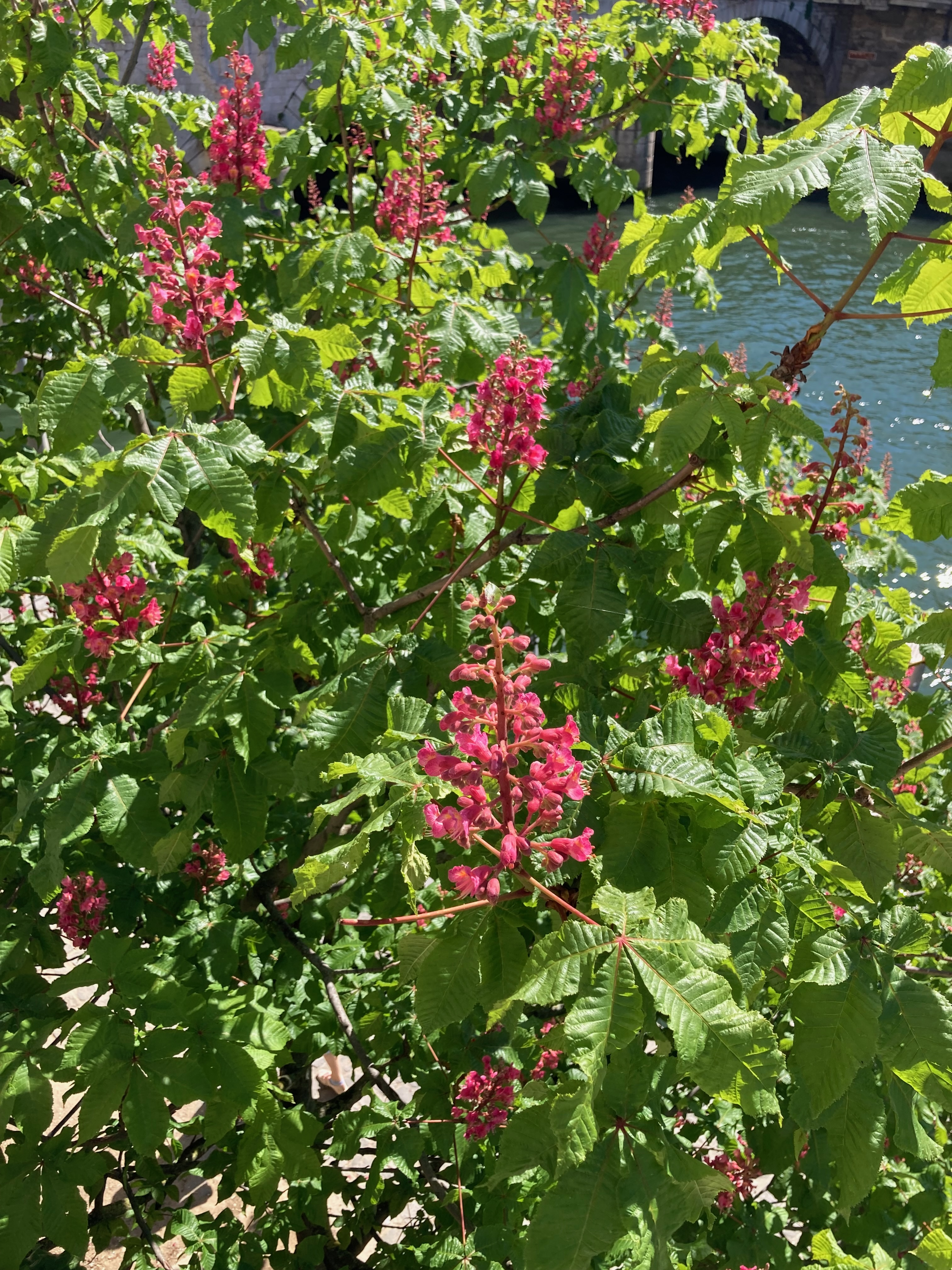
Aesculus × carnea inflorescences

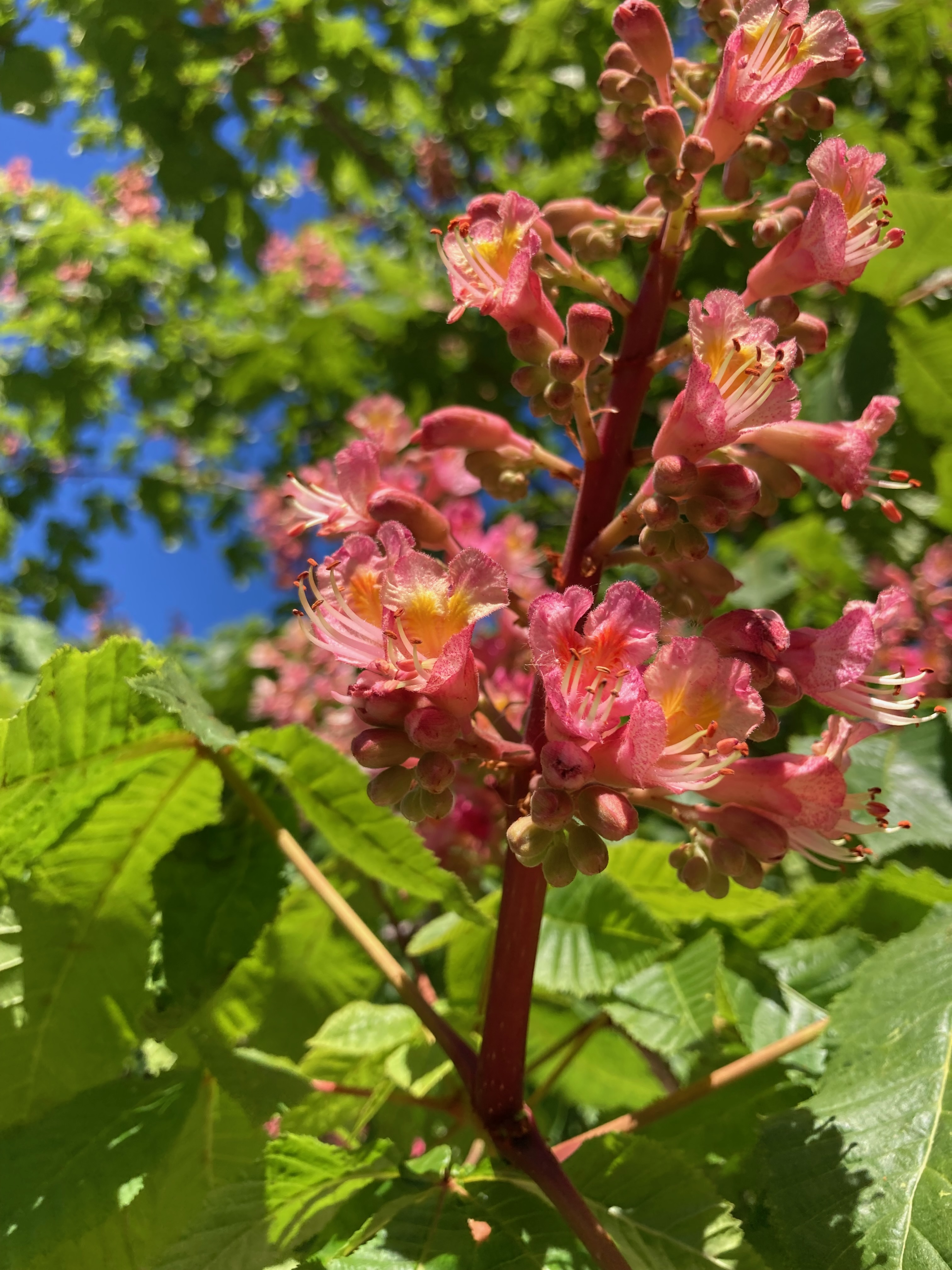
Detail of Aesculus × carnea flower

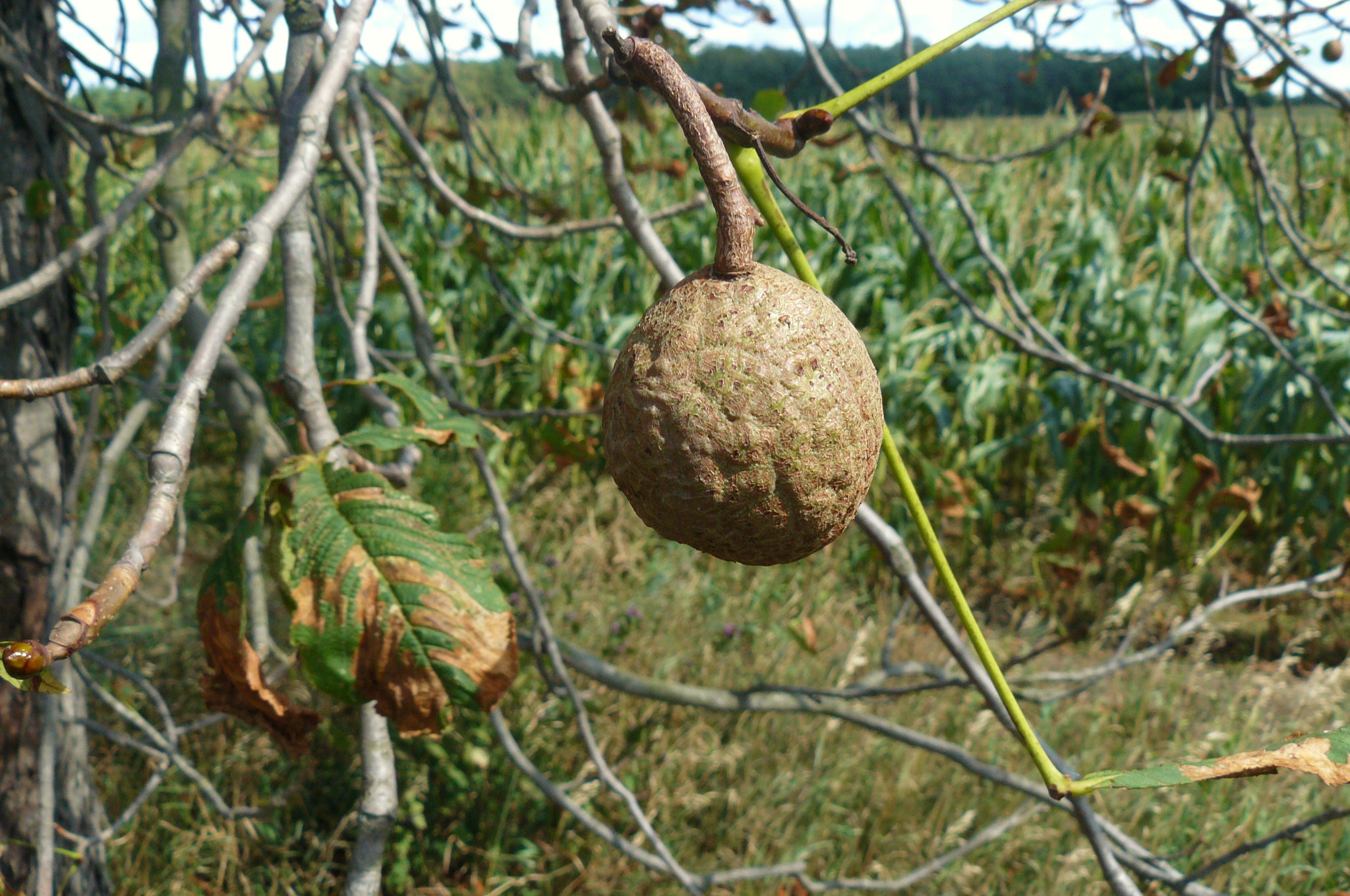
Aesculus × carnea fruit is usually spineless

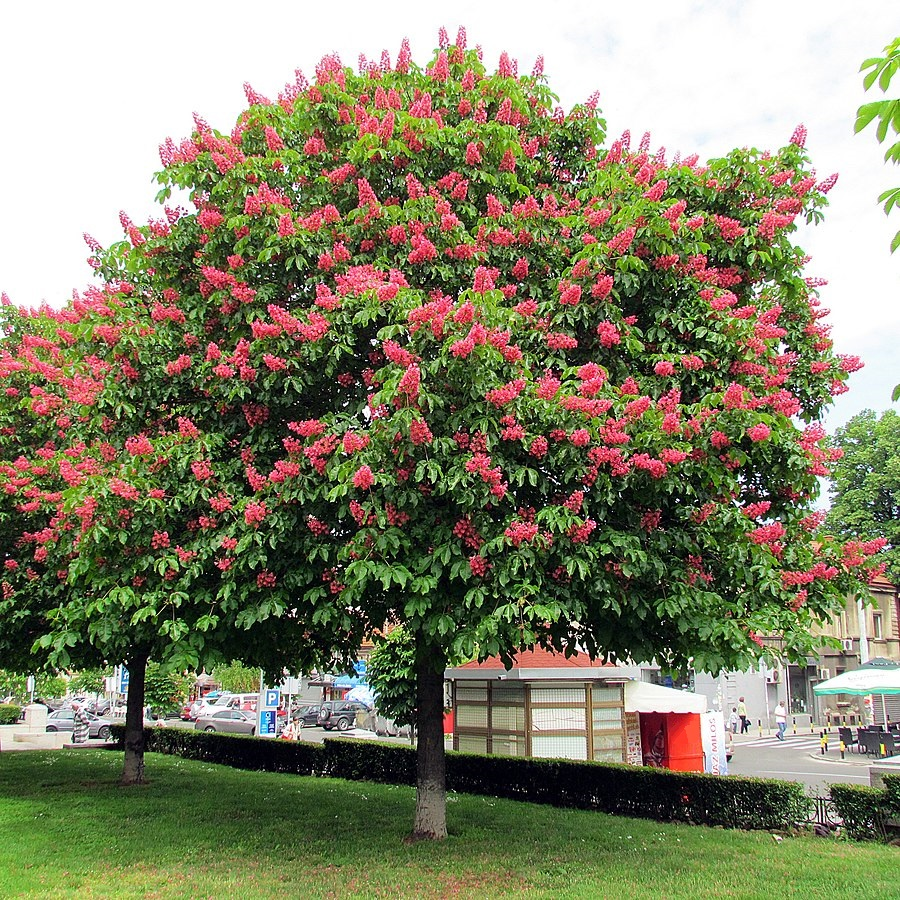
Mature tree in Belgrade

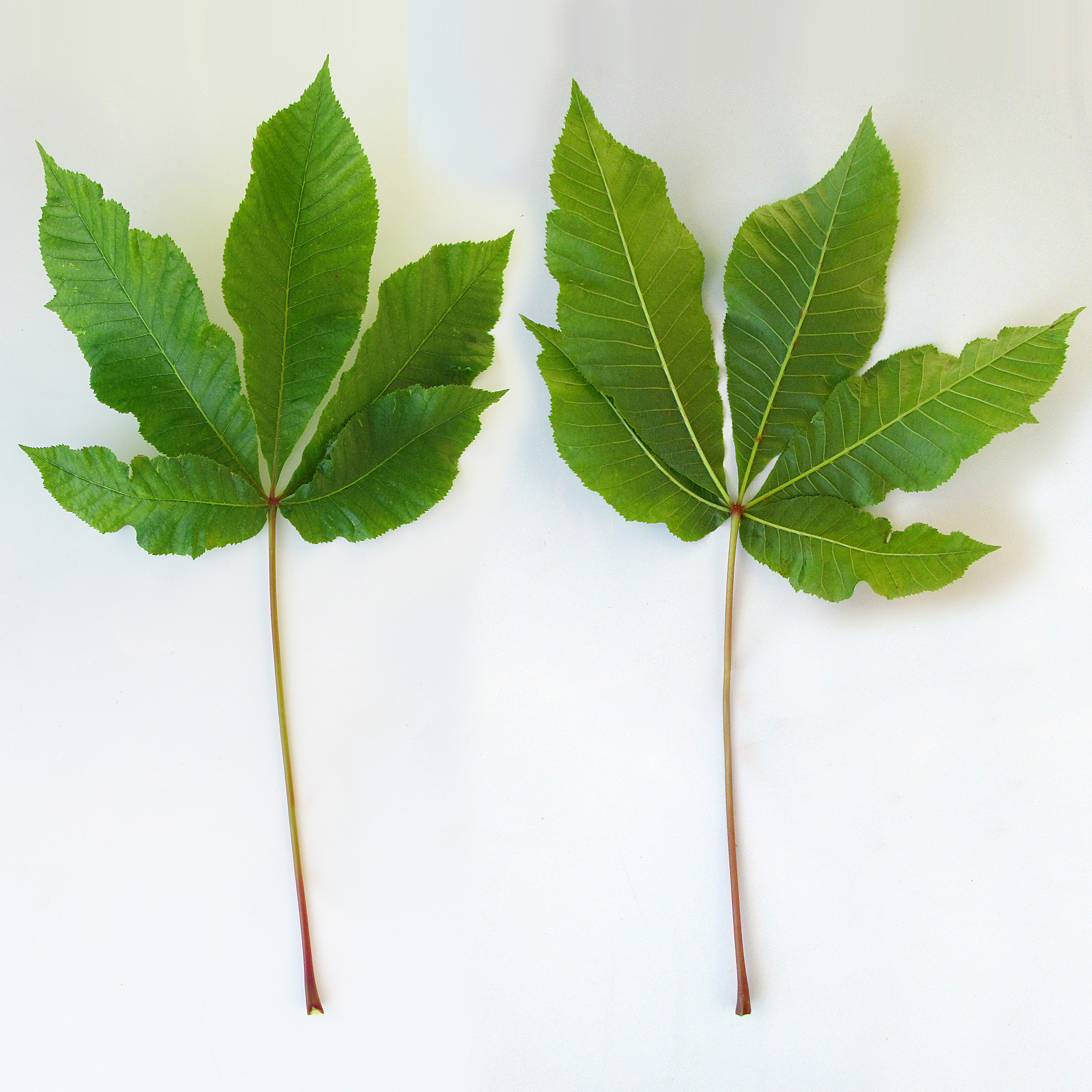
Detail of the leaves
