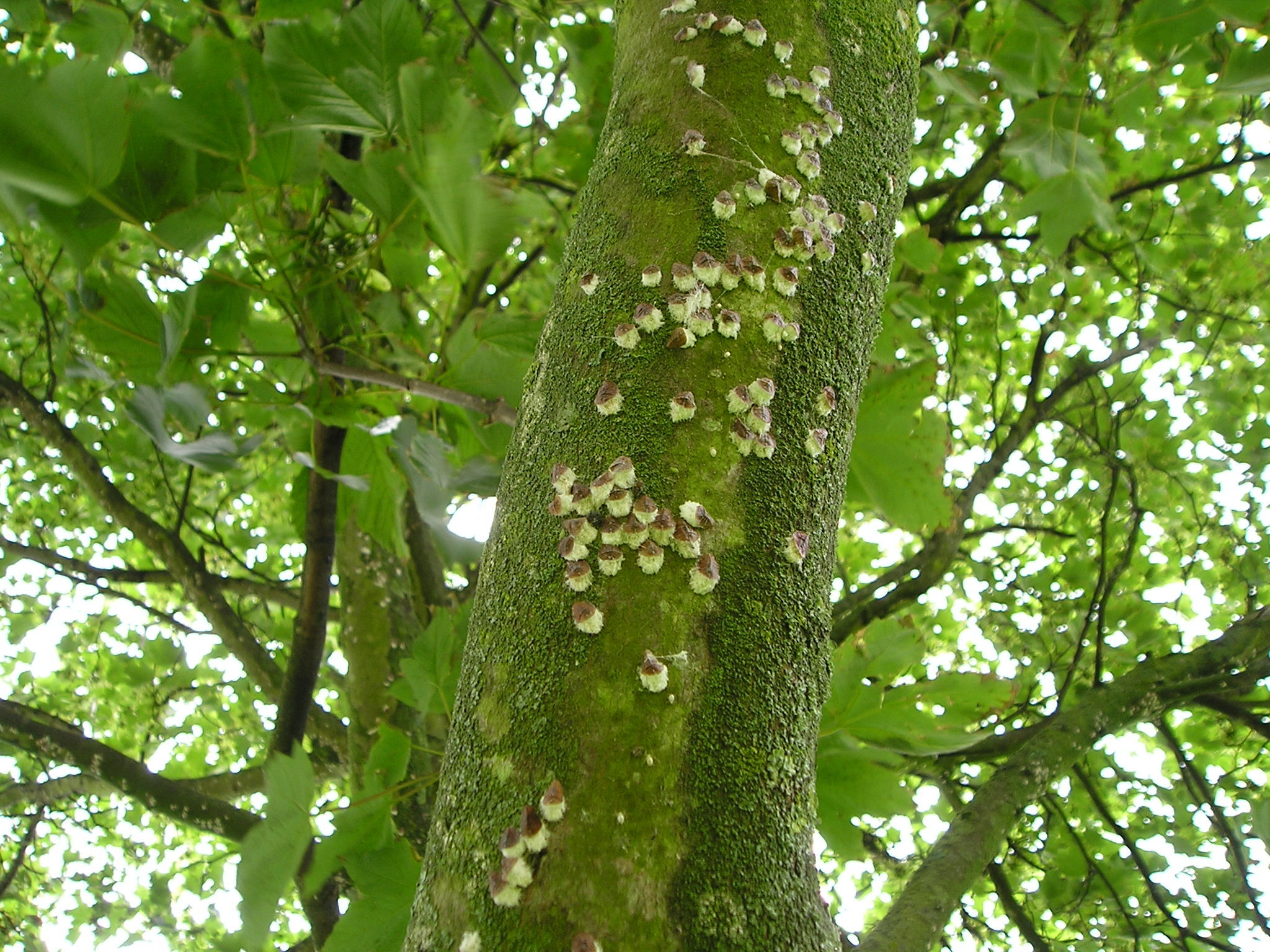
- P. regalis in Llanelli, Wales

Scientific classification
- Domain: Eukaryota
- Kingdom: Animalia
- Phylum: Arthropoda
- Class: Insecta
- Order: Hemiptera
- Suborder: Sternorrhyncha
- Family: Coccidae
- Genus: Pulvinaria
- Species: P. regalis

Binomial name
- Pulvinaria regalis Canard, 1968

= Pulvinaria regalis =

Species of true bug

Pulvinaria regalis is a species of scale insect in the family Coccidae. Although it is commonly known as the horse chestnut scale, it affects other trees besides horse chestnuts as well as many species of woody shrubs. Adults are normally all female and produce eggs by parthenogenesis. The insects are thought to have originated in Asia but arrived in Europe in the second half of the twentieth century.

== Host species ==
Pulvinaria regalis is known to be hosted by 65 species of plant from 25 families. The main species of tree which act as hosts for this scale insect are horse chestnut, sycamore, maple, lime, elm, magnolia, bay and dogwood.

== Distribution and habitat ==
Pulvinaria regalis is thought to be native to Asia. It was first detected in Europe in the 1960s when it became established in London, it arrived in Paris by 1968 and had spread to Germany by 1989, where it has since been detected in many cities. The female insects have no wings and are therefore unable to fly, and their means of transportation is thought to be either with tree prunings, or on nursery stock. The nymphs at their crawler stage may be transported by wind and it is possible that they, or the eggs, are sometimes carried on the legs of birds.

Scale insects can occur in both rural and urban environments, but town trees are usually less healthy and pest burdens tend to be higher in towns. This is thought to be due to various habitat differences in urban settings; higher temperatures, more air pollution, lower availability of nutrients, and more stress caused by lack of moisture (more run-off and less water penetrating the ground). P. regalis is primarily a pest of urban trees; its sap-sucking activities reduce its hosts' vigour, and the excess honeydew produced by the insects encourages the growth of sooty mould, which is unsightly.

== Biology ==
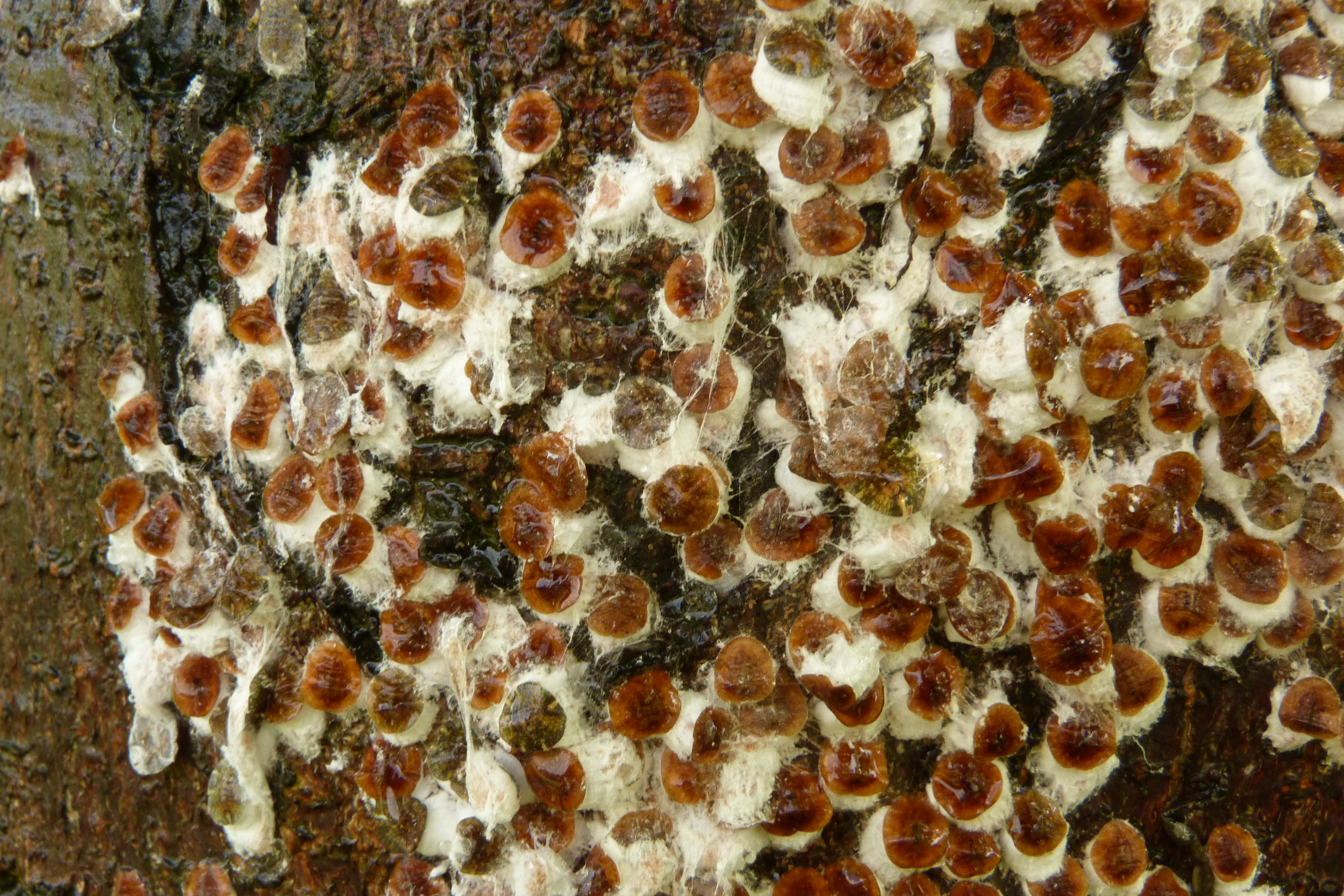
P. regalis infecting horse chestnut in Denmark

The adult scale insect resembles a limpet and remains stationary on the bark of its host tree where it feeds on sap. Although males can occur, the insects are normally all female, and reproduce by parthenogenesis. In early summer, the mature female lays white, circular egg masses which become visible as they protrude slightly from under her brown scale. The eggs hatch into nymphs which crawl away from the mother along the branches to find foliage, where they start to suck sap. In the autumn, they return to the trunk and larger branches where they spend the winter as flat scales about 1 mm (0.04 in) long. They resume feeding in spring and are fully grown by early summer. There is a single generation each year and the adults die after reproducing. This insect has glands that produce several forms of wax; some glands produce water-repellent wax that keeps the air passages leading to the spiracles open. Other glands produce long white filaments of wax that serve a function in the construction of the sac that surrounds the eggs. To avoid getting contaminated by its own honeydew, the scale insect has a six-bristled mechanism close to the anus, with which it can flick away its excrement.
