= 4H-1-Benzopyran =

Names
- Preferred IUPAC name 4H-1-Benzopyran

Identifiers
CAS Number	254-03-5
3D model (JSmol)	Interactive image
Beilstein Reference	111589
ChEBI	CHEBI:35603
ChemSpider	119845
PubChem CID	136068
CompTox Dashboard (EPA)	DTXSID20180050
- InChI: InChI=1S/C9H8O/c1-2-6-9-8(4-1)5-3-7-10-9/h1-4,6-7H,5H2 Key: JCIDEANDDNSHQC-UHFFFAOYSA-N
- SMILES: C1C=COC2=CC=CC=C21

Properties
Chemical formula	C_{9}H_{8}O
Molar mass	132.162 g·mol^{−1}
Appearance	colorless
Density	1.0732 g/cm^{3}
Boiling point	80 °C (176 °F; 353 K) 13 Torr
- Except where otherwise noted, data are given for materials in their standard state (at 25 °C [77 °F], 100 kPa). (what is ?) Infobox references

4H-1-Benzopyran is an organic compound with the formula C_{6}H_{4}C_{3}H_{4}O. It is one of two isomers of benzopyran, the other being 2H-1-benzopyran, which is more prevalent. It can be viewed as the fusion of a benzene ring to a heterocyclic pyran ring.

Some benzopyrans have shown anticancerous activity in vitro.

The radical form of benzopyran is paramagnetic. The unpaired electron is delocalized over the whole benzopyran molecule, rendering it less reactive than one would expect otherwise. A similar example is the cyclopentadienyl radical. Commonly, benzopyran is encountered in the reduced state, in which it is partially saturated with one hydrogen atom, introducing a tetrahedral CH_{2} group in the pyran ring. Therefore, there are many structural isomers owing to the multiple possible positions of the oxygen atom and the tetrahedral carbon atom:

Structural isomers of chromene
2H-chromene (2H-1-benzopyran)	4H-chromene (4H-1-benzopyran)
5H-chromene	7H-chromene
8aH-chromene	

Structural isomers of isochromene
1H-isochromene (1H-2-benzopyran)	3H-isochromene (3H-2-benzopyran)

== Nomenclature ==
According to current IUPAC nomenclature, the name chromene used in previous recommendations is retained; however, systematic ‘benzo’ names, for example 2H-1-benzopyran, are preferred IUPAC names for chromene, isochromene, chromane, isochromane, and their chalcogen analogues. There are two isomers of benzopyran that vary by the orientation of the fusion of the two rings compared to the oxygen, resulting in 1-benzopyran (chromene) and 2-benzopyran (isochromene)—the number denotes where the oxygen atom is located by standard naphthalene-like nomenclature.

== See also ==
- Benzofuran
- Benzopyrone
