= Bleeding canker of horse chestnut =

Disease of horse chestnut trees

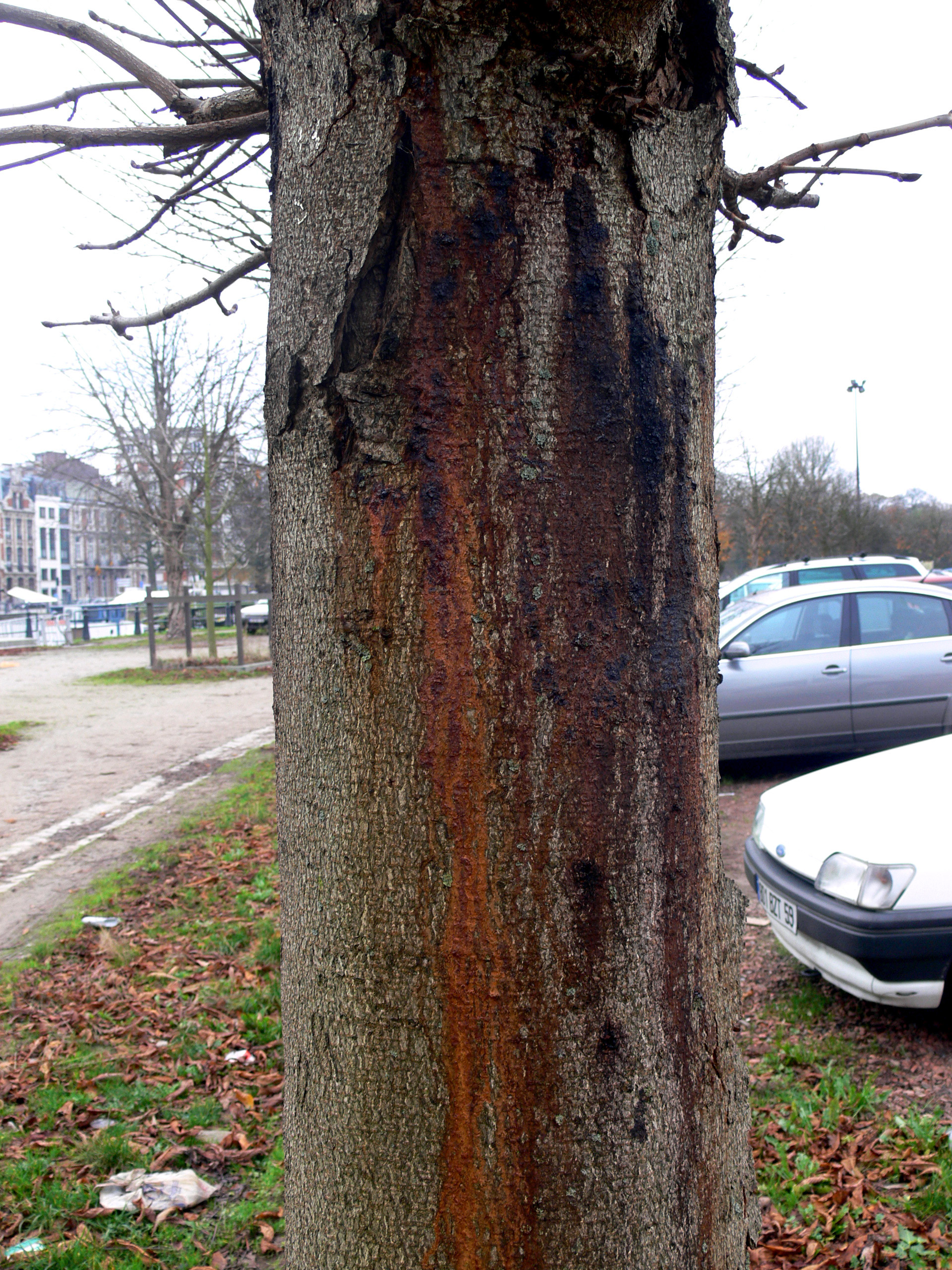
Bleeding canker and bark cracking on the trunk of Horse Chestnut

Bleeding canker of horse chestnut is a common canker of horse chestnut trees (Aesculus hippocastanum, also known as conker trees) that is known to be caused by infection with several different pathogens.

Infections by the gram-negative fluorescent bacterium Pseudomonas syringae pathovar aesculi are a new phenomenon, and have caused most of the bleeding cankers on horse chestnut that are now frequently seen in Britain.

== Disease cycle ==
Pseudomonas syringae pv. Aesculi is a bacterium that causes bleeding canker of horse chestnut. The pathogen overwinters in the soil and can survive in the soil for about a year. It is spread by water, rain, and tools that were used on the infected tree. It causes lesions on the bark of the tree that can be near the base of the trunk or higher. The bleeding from the cankers mostly occurs in the spring and fall. Infection of the tree through lenticels and leaf scars when inoculated in a study occurred most readily in the spring and summer. In contrast, lesion growth from an artificial wound was less severe in the summer. The lesions developed the most (after inoculation) in October and November, during the dormant period of the tree. Development of the disease occurs throughout the year. The disease starts with local lesions, but becomes systematic when it affects the crown of the tree, usually after several years of infection. This is a bacterium so the pathogen reproduces by binary fission. The pathogen is spreading rapidly across western Europe though movement mostly by wind blown rain.

== Causes ==
=== Pseudomonas syringae pathovar aesculi ===
In the past few years, the bacterial pathogen Pseudomonas syringae pv. aesculi has emerged as a new and virulent agent for this disease in Western Europe. Specific to horse chestnut trees, this pathogen infects the bark (cambium) around the trunk and main branches. As it spreads, it cuts off the water supply to the crown; and when it completely encircles the trunk, the tree will die.

This particular infective agent emerged in the past few years, and has now spread rapidly to infect many trees in Western Europe.

Initially the outbreak was attributed to Phytophthora, until DNA tests suggested that a pathovar of Pseudomonas syringae was responsible; and this hypothesis was confirmed in 2007 with tests satisfying Koch's postulates.

The disease has risen markedly in the UK since 2003, and now approximately one half of all horse chestnuts in Great Britain are affected and showing symptoms to some degree. The disease is spreading at an alarming rate in the Netherlands, where one third of all horse chestnuts are affected to a greater or lesser extent. A similar upsurge is reported in Belgium and France.

== Management ==
Management of Bleeding Canker of Chestnut is not definitive and treatments are currently being investigated. Because the pathogen can be spread by contaminated tools, cultural practices are important to management. Tools should be cleaned and used with caution after being used on infected trees. Recovery of trees is possible, so management strategies are focused on keeping trees healthy so they can recover. One recommendation is to add fertilizer that contains Potassium phosphate. Soil de-compaction, providing good drainage, and mulching to minimize fluctuation of soil temperature and moisture are all ways to improve or maintain tree health and to manage the pathogen.

Chemical methods can be used to help the tree maintain health and avoid progress of the disease. Management strategies are currently being developed. A study performed in 2015 examined the infection on trees and found that 41 F1 progeny parent tree source had the most promising lines of viability for resistance.

Effective Heat methods: Heating up the bark of the trunk of the Chestnut trees with warm water or heat blankets of Chestnut Tree Treatment. Heat Trial in Station Dordrecht Zuid: initially established success in the laboratory by Wageningen Plant Research. After heating up the bacterium for two days at approximately 40°C the bacterium was no longer able to continue to grow and multiply. Seedlings were able to restore their wounds. Packing of chestnut trees with water or heat blankets is used in studies to improve the effectiveness of the Heat treatment to larger chestnut trees.

Larger scale tests of the Heat method with electric blankets of Chestnut Tree Treatment are currently being investigated for public Chestnut Trees in the Dutch Amsterdam Region, see the map here:

== Importance ==
The Horse Chestnut is considered an economically and socially important tree. It is estimated that there are 470,000 trees in Great Britain. Many are urban, in parks and gardens. They are desirable because they can tolerate many conditions including dry sandy soils, wet clays and chalk. The tree is economically important because it contains aescin which can be used for its anti-inflammatory properties. Wildlife also benefit from the nuts the tree provides.
