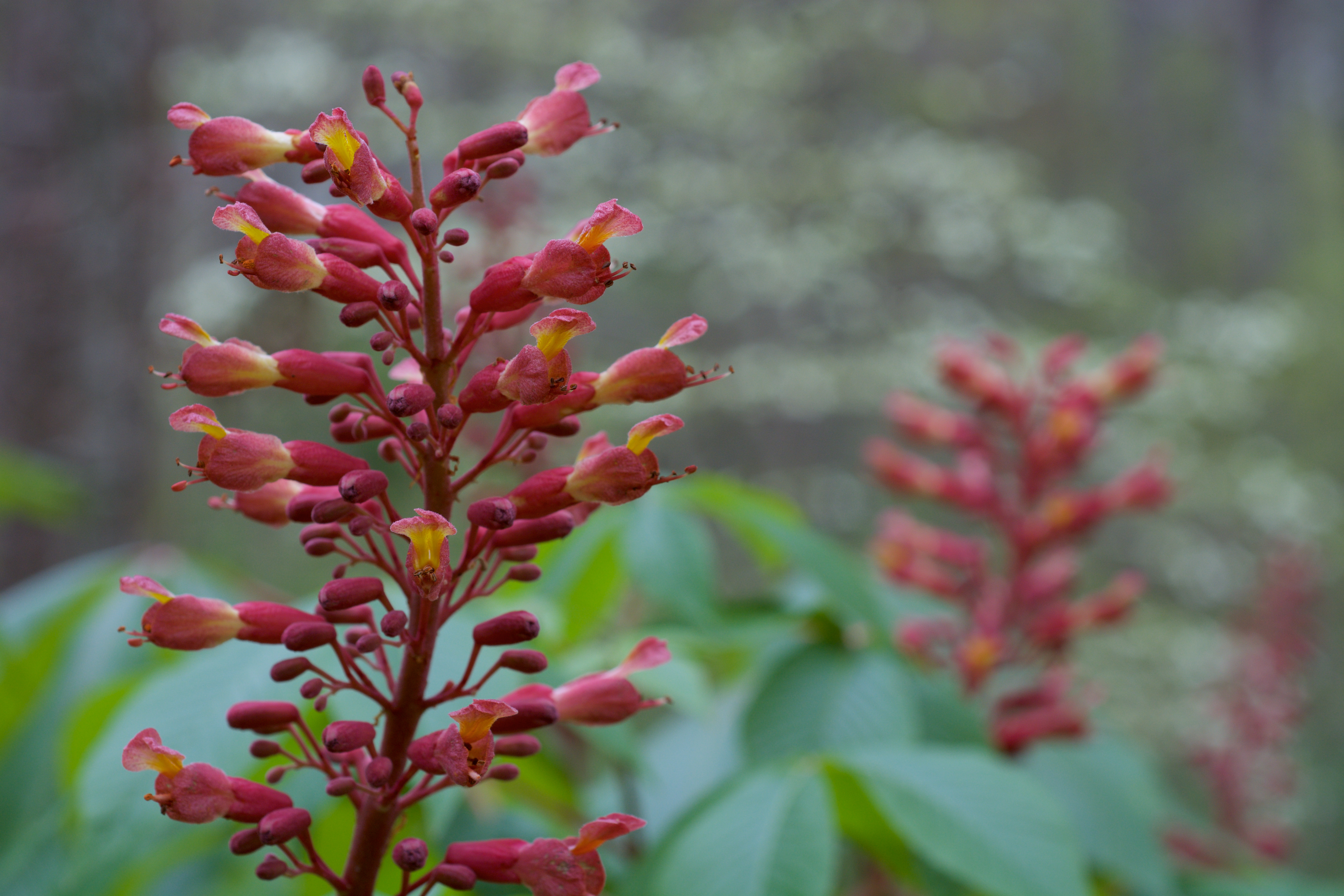

Conservation status
- Least Concern (IUCN 3.1)

Scientific classification
- Kingdom: Plantae
- Clade: Tracheophytes
- Clade: Angiosperms
- Clade: Eudicots
- Clade: Rosids
- Order: Sapindales
- Family: Sapindaceae
- Genus: Aesculus
- Species: A. pavia

Binomial name
- Aesculus pavia L.
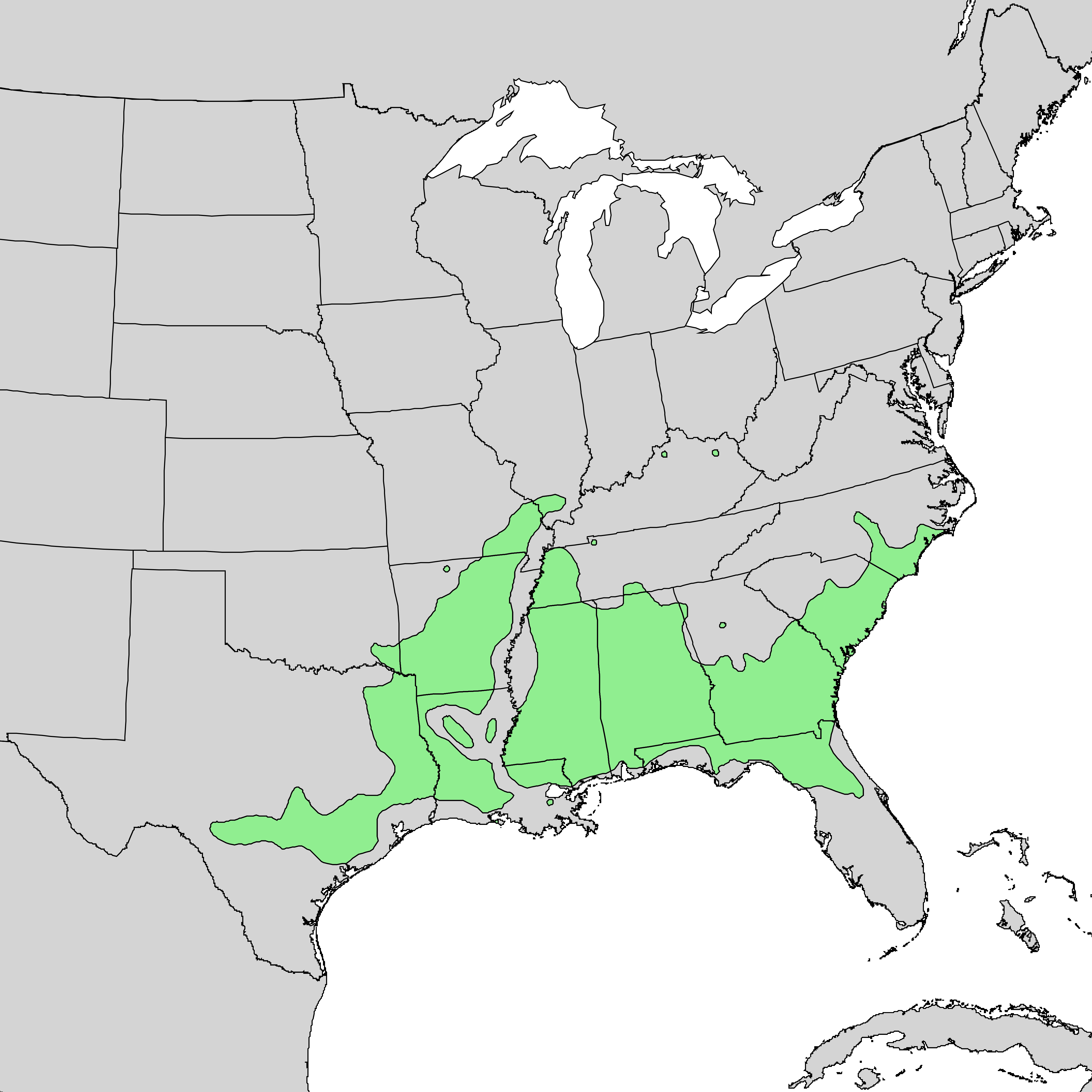

= Aesculus pavia =

Species of tree

Aesculus pavia, known as red buckeye or firecracker plant (formerly Pavia rubra), is a species of deciduous flowering plant. The small tree or shrub is native to the southern and eastern parts of the United States, found from Illinois to Virginia in the north and from Texas to Florida in the south. It is hardy far to the north of its native range, with successful cultivation poleward to Arboretum Mustila in Finland.

It has a number of local names, such as scarlet buckeye, woolly buckeye and firecracker plant.

== Description ==
The red buckeye is a large shrub or small tree. It reaches a height of 5–8 m (16–26 ft), often growing in a multi-stemmed form. Its leaves are opposite, and are composed usually of five elliptical serrated leaflets, each 10–15 cm (4–6 in) long. It bears 10–18-centimetre-long (4–7 in) clusters of attractive dark red tubular flowers in the spring. The flowers are hermaphrodite. The smooth light brown fruits, about 2.5 cm (1 in) or so in diameter, reach maturity in early fall.

The flowers are attractive to hummingbirds as well as bees.

== Varieties ==
There are two varieties:

- Aesculus pavia var. pavia: typical red buckeye.
- Aesculus pavia var. flavescens: yellow-flowered red buckeye.

The yellow-flowered variety, var. flavescens, is found in higher country in Texas, and hybrids with intermediate flower color occur.

Ornamental cultivars, such as the low-growing 'Humilis', have been selected for garden use.

=== Hybrids ===
Red buckeye has hybridized with common horse-chestnut (Aesculus hippocastanum) in cultivation, the hybrid being named Aesculus × carnea, red horse-chestnut. The hybrid is a medium-sized tree to 13.5–17 m (45–55 ft) tall, intermediate between the parent species in most respects, but inheriting the red flower color from A. pavia. It is a popular tree in large gardens and parks, most commonly the selected cultivar 'Briotii'. Hybrids of red buckeye with yellow buckeye (A. flava) have also been found, and named Aesculus × hybrida.

== Uses ==
The fruits are rich in saponins, which are poisonous to humans, although not particularly dangerous because they are not ingested easily. The seeds are poisonous. The oils can be extracted to make soap, although this is not viable commercially.

== Gallery ==
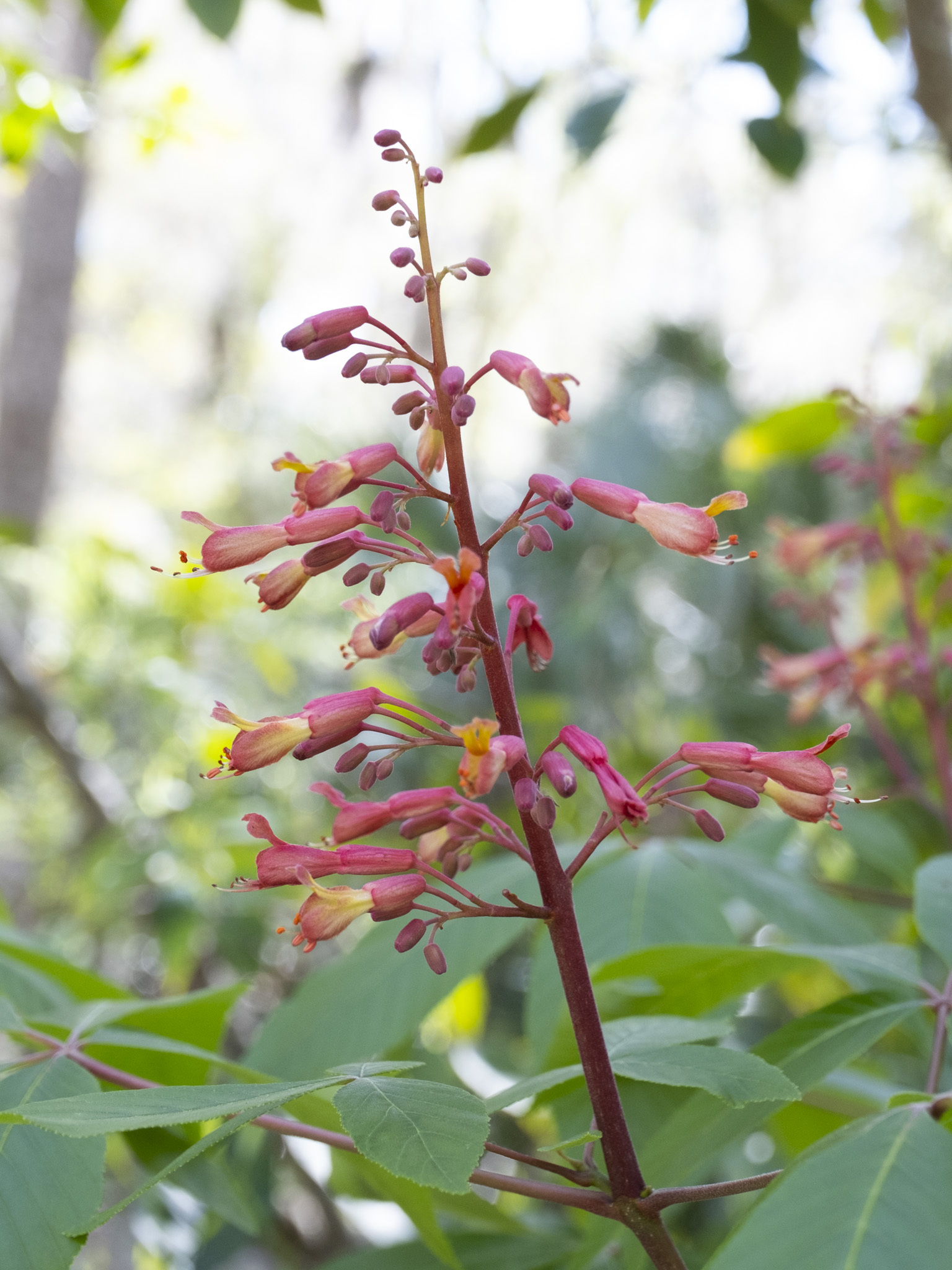
Red inflorescence close up

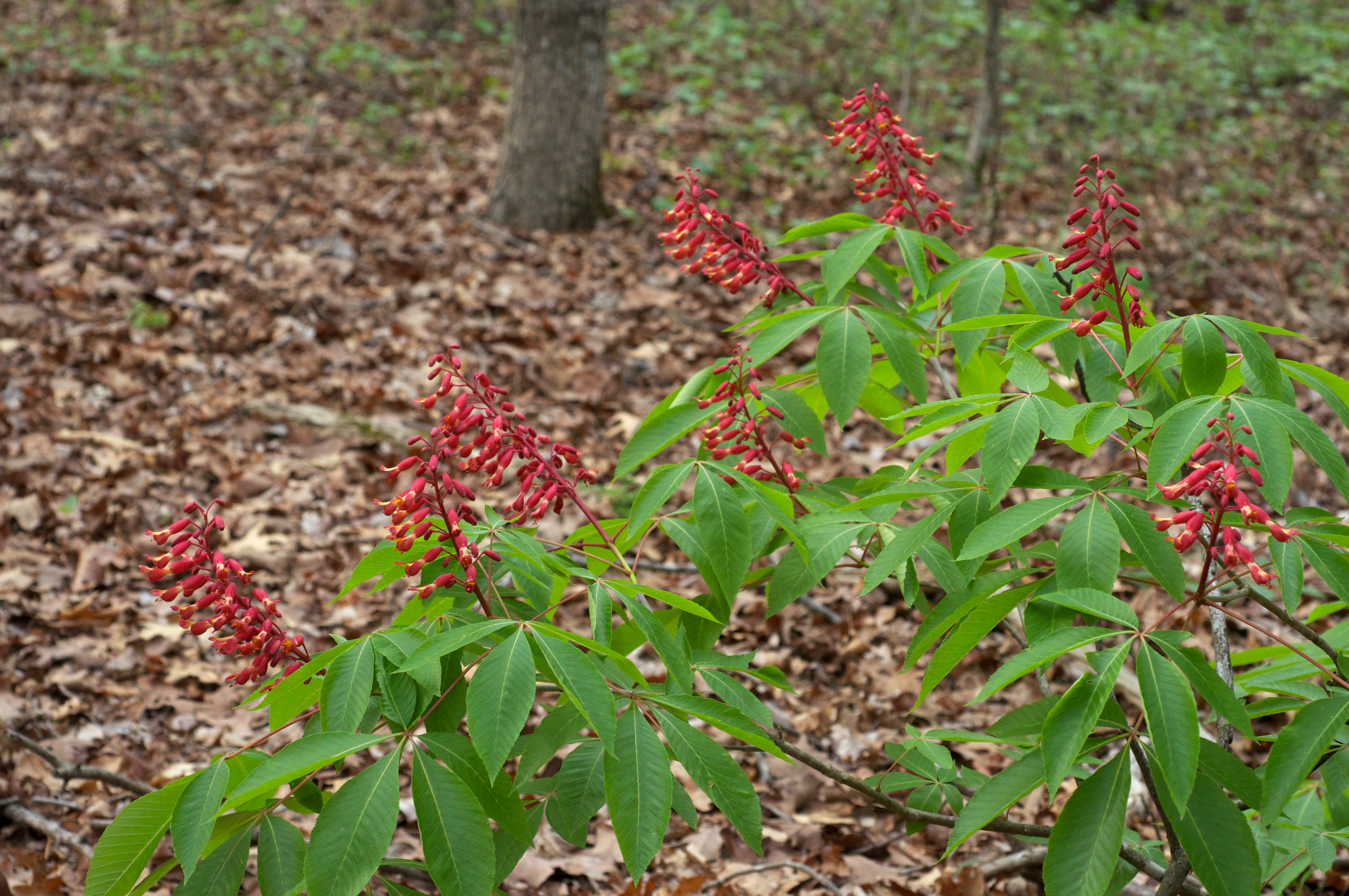
Group of inflorescences

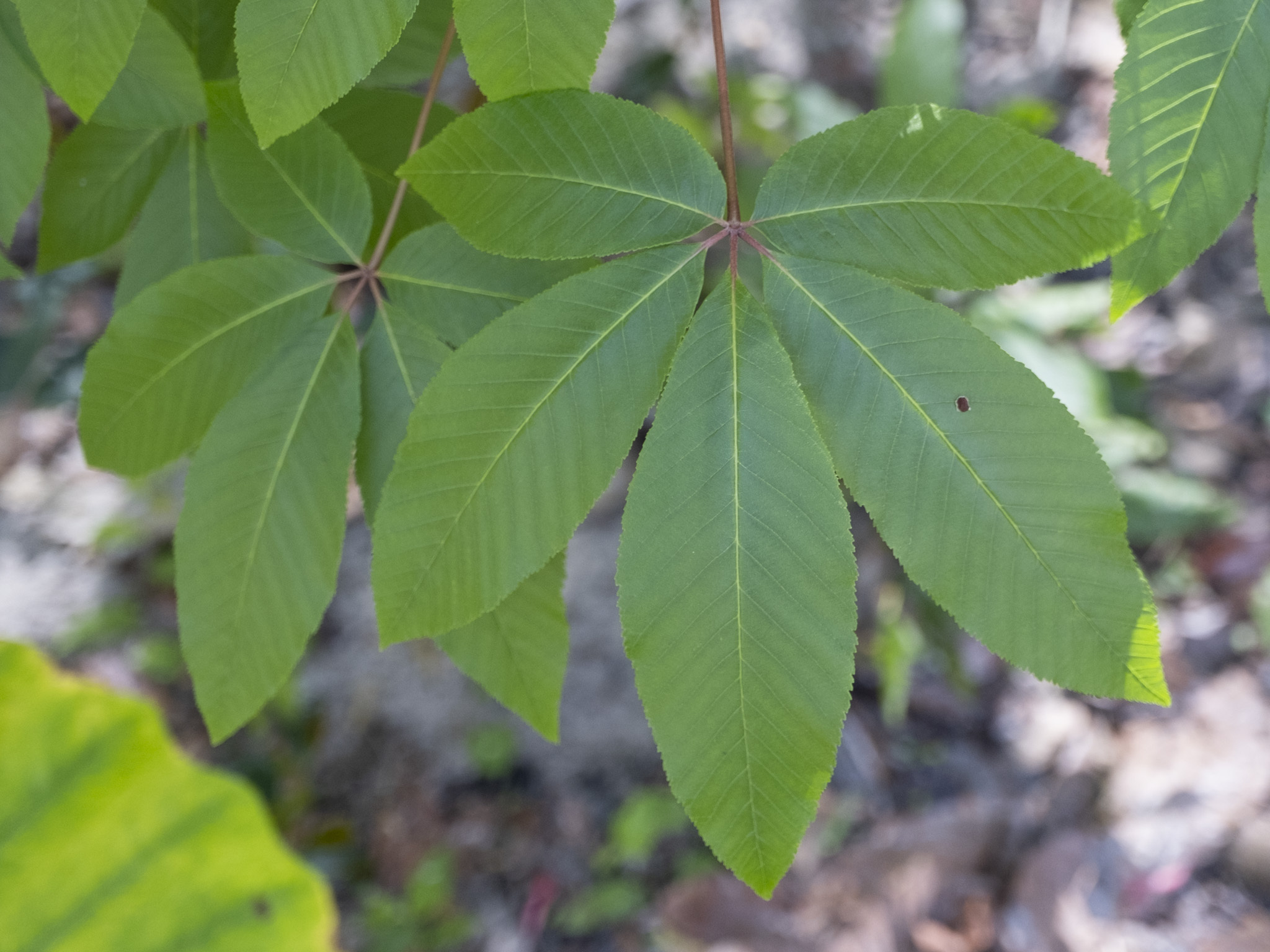
Leaves

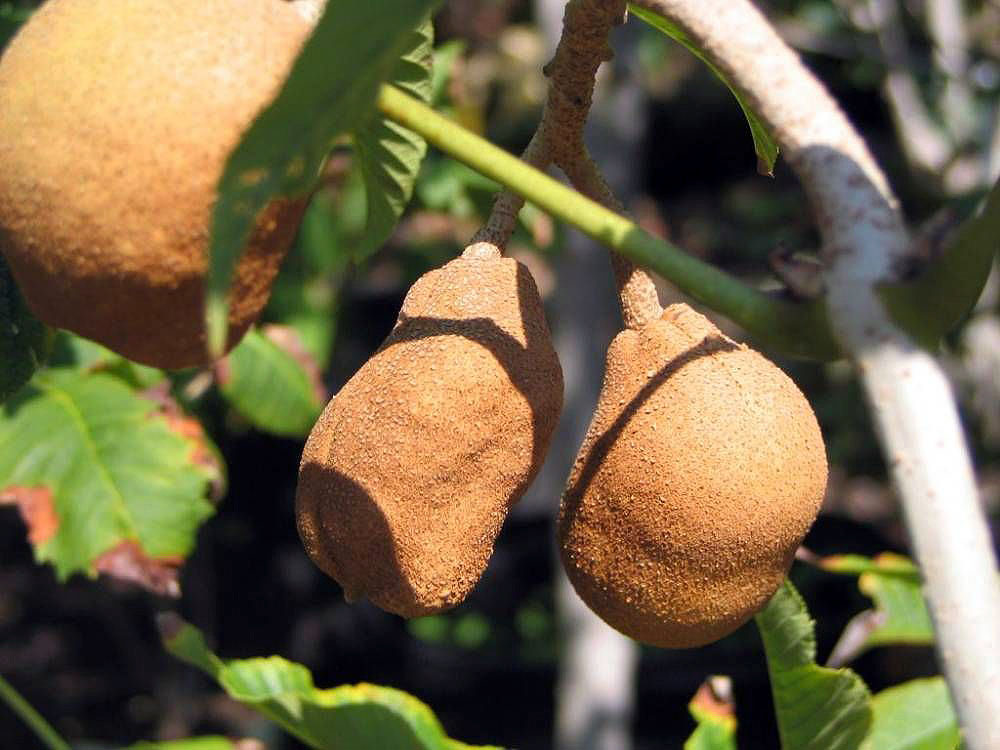
Maturing fruits

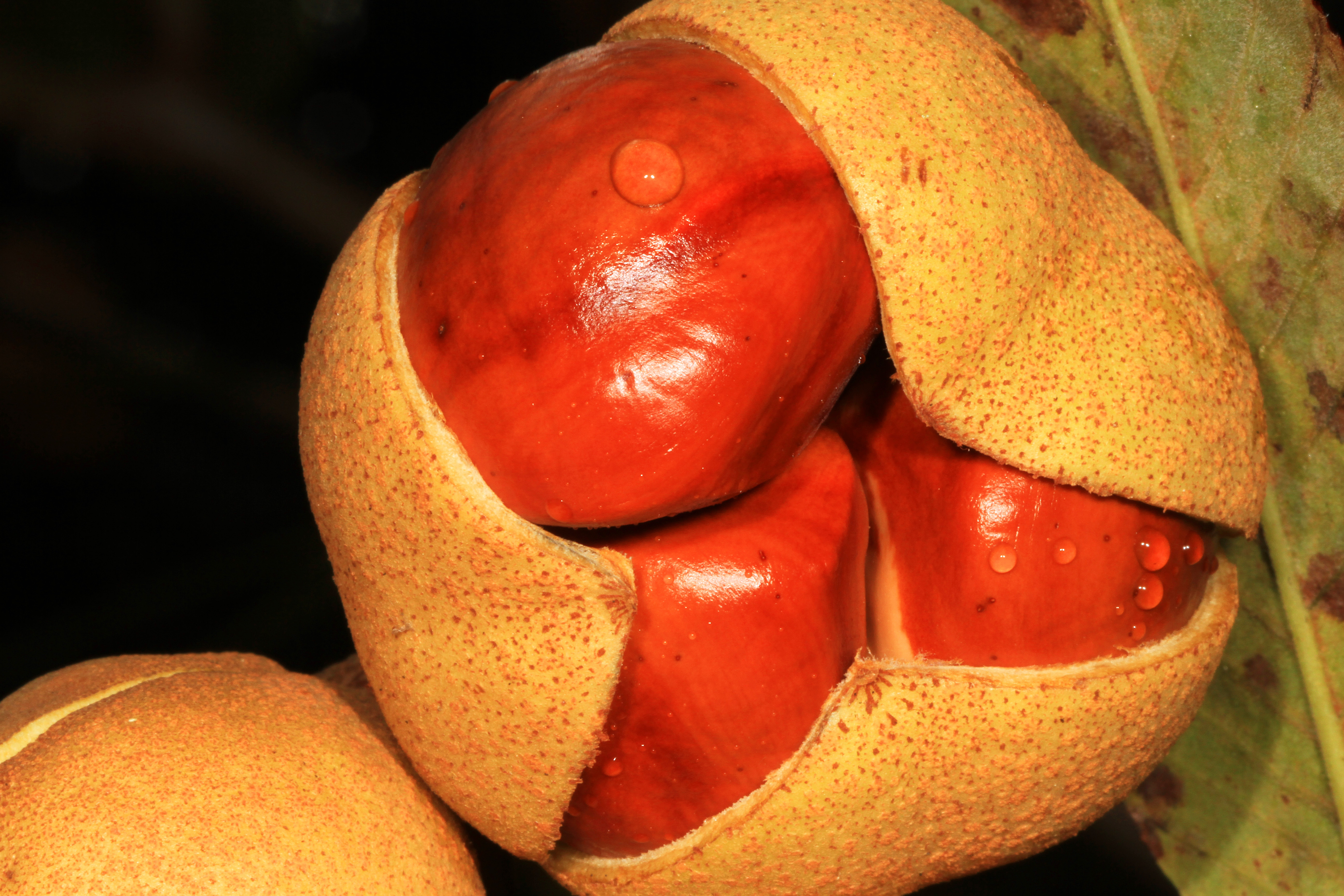
Mature fruit

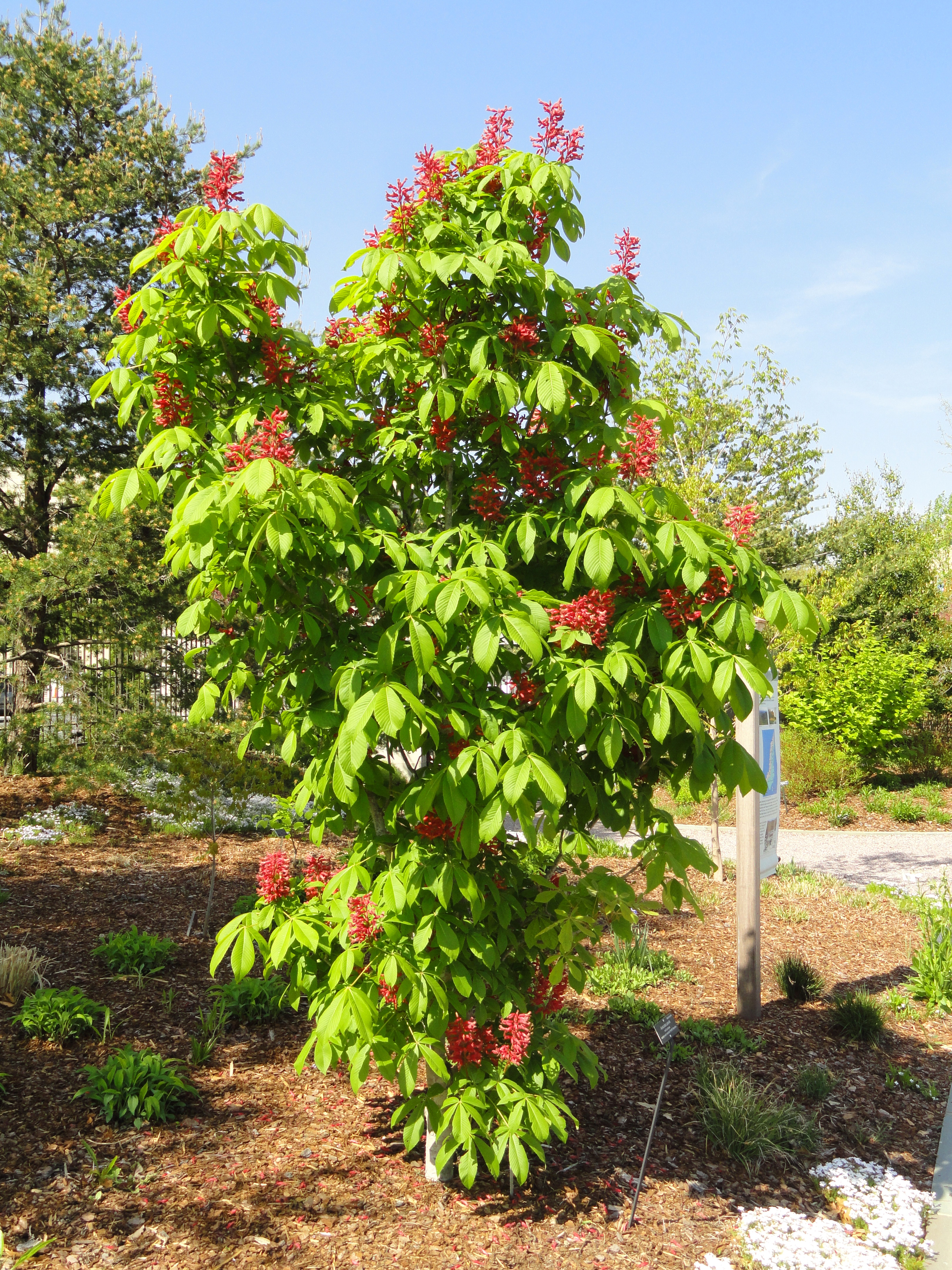
Young tree habit (cultivated)
