= Pulvinaria mesembryanthemi =

- Pulvinaria mesembryanthemi photographed in Morro Bay, California, United States

Scientific classification
- Kingdom: Animalia
- Phylum: Arthropoda
- Clade: Pancrustacea
- Class: Insecta
- Order: Hemiptera
- Suborder: Sternorrhyncha
- Family: Coccidae
- Genus: Pulvinaria
- Species: P. mesembryanthemi

Binomial name
- Pulvinaria mesembryanthemi (Vallot, 1829)

Synonyms
- Coccus mesembryanthemi Vallot, 1829; Pulvinaria biplicata Targioni Tozzetti, 1868; Pulvinaria mesembrianthemi (Vallot, 1829); Icerya mesembryanthemi Péringuey, 1893; Pulvinariella mesembryanthemi (Vallot, 1829); Calypticus mesembryanthemi Gill, 1988; Pulvirariella mesembrianthemi (Signoret, 1873)

Species of scale insect

Pulvinaria mesembryanthemi, commonly known as iceplant scale, is a species of soft scale insect that feeds on plants in the family Aizoaceae. Originally native to South Africa, it is widely introduced elsewhere in regions with a Mediterranean climate including parts of the Americas, Europe, and Oceania.

== Distribution and ecology ==
Pulvinaria mesembryanthemi is originally native to South Africa but is widely introduced elsewhere, mostly in coastal areas with Mediterranean climates. In its native range its primary host plant is Carpobrotus edulis, and the dispersal of P. mesembryanthemi appears to be linked to the spread of this host plant. Besides C. edulis, known host plants include other species of Carpobrotus and species of Disphyma, Lampranthus, Mesembryanthemum, and Ruschia.

In Africa it is known from its native South Africa as well as Algeria, Egypt, Kenya, Eswatini, and Zimbabwe. In Eurasia it is known from France (including Corsica), Greece (including Crete), Hungary, Israel, Italy (including Sardinia and Sicily), Malta, the Netherlands, Portugal (including Madeira), Romania, Slovenia, Spain (including the Canary Islands), Turkey, and the United Kingdom (including the Isles of Scilly).

In the Americas it is known from Argentina, Chile, and the United States. In the United States it is known from the Hawaiian Islands and California.

In Oceania it is known from Australia and New Zealand. In Australia it occurs mostly in coastal areas and is known from the Australian Capital Territory, New South Wales, Queensland, South Australia, Tasmania, Victoria, and Western Australia. In addition to Carpobrotus edulis, known hosts plants in Australia include Atriplex vesicaria, Carpobrotus glaucescens, Lampranthus glaucus, Mesembryanthemum crystallinum, and Sesuvium portulacastrum. In New Zealand it is known from Auckland, Christchurch, Thames, Napier, and the Three Kings Islands.
