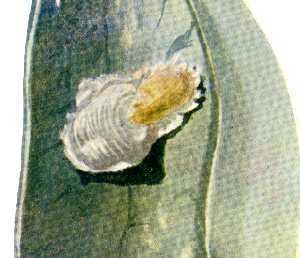

Scientific classification
- Kingdom: Animalia
- Phylum: Arthropoda
- Class: Insecta
- Order: Hemiptera
- Suborder: Sternorrhyncha
- Family: Coccidae
- Genus: Pulvinaria
- Species: P. psidii

Binomial name
- Pulvinaria psidii Maskell, 1893

Synonyms
- Chloropulvinaria Maskell, 1893

= Pulvinaria psidii =

Species of insect

Pulvinaria psidii (guava scale; green shield scale; guava mealy scale), is a species of soft scale insect in the family Coccidae.
