= Aescin =

Main active component in horse chestnut

β-Aescin (main component)
- Beta-aescin molecular structure

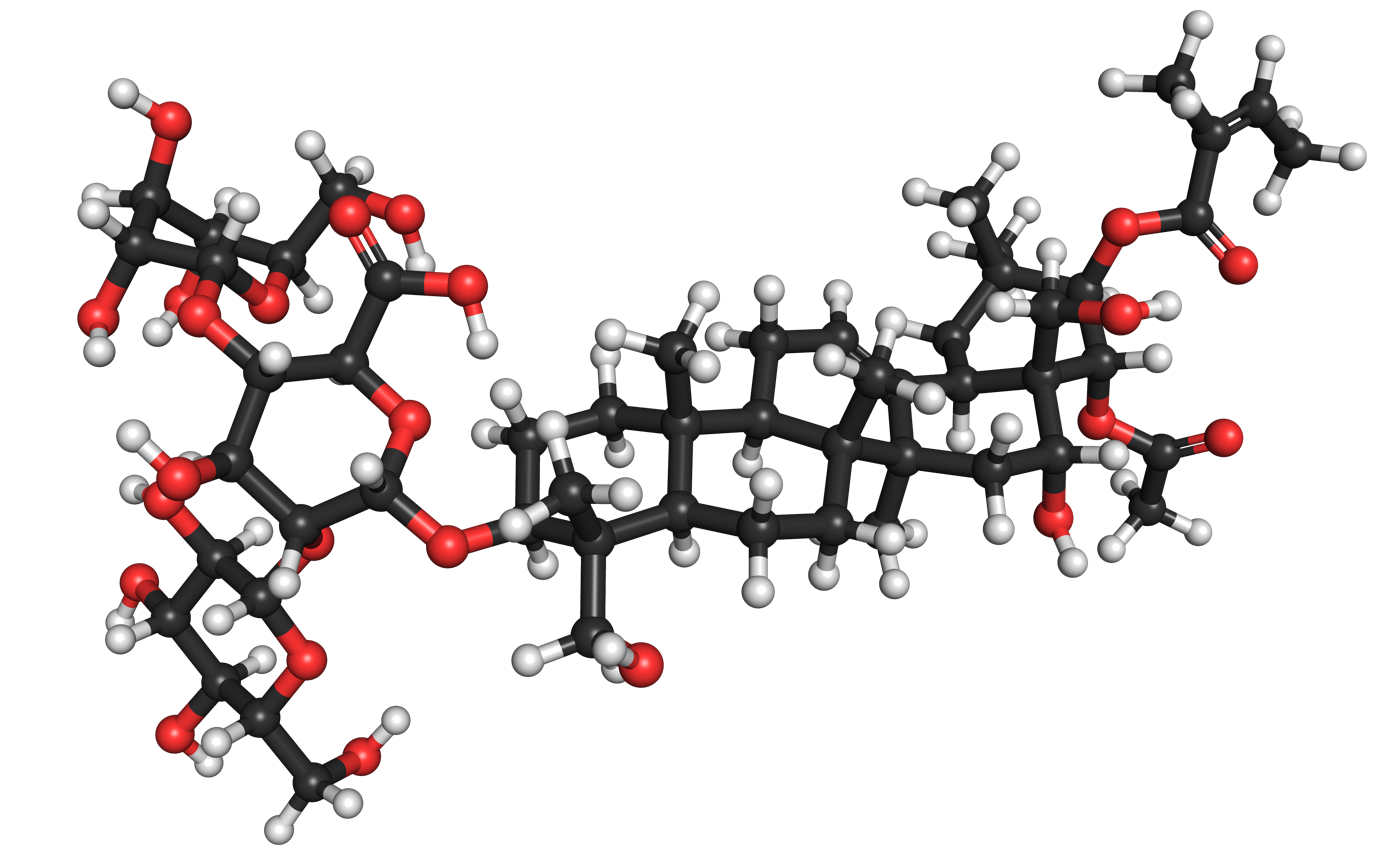
- A 3D representation of a beta-aescin molecule

Names
- IUPAC name β-D-Glucopyranosyl-(1→2)-[β-D-glucopyranosyl-(1→4)]-(22α-(acetyloxy)-16α,24,28-trihydroxy-21β-{[(2Z)-2-methylbut-2-enoyl]oxy}olean-12-en-3β-yl β-D-glucopyranosiduronic acid)
- Systematic IUPAC name (2S,3S,4S,5R,6R)-6-{[(3S,4S,4aR,6aR,6bS,8R,8aR,9R,10R,12aS,14aR,14bR)-9-(Acetyloxy)-8-hydroxy-4,8a-bis(hydroxymethyl)-4,6a,6b,11,11,14b-hexamethyl-10-{[2-methylbut-2-enoyl]oxy}-1,2,3,4,4a,5,6,6a,6b,7,8,8a,9,10,11,12,12a,14,14a,14b-icosahydropicen-3-yl]oxy}-4-hydroxy-3,5-bis{[(2S,3R,4S,5S,6R)-3,4,5-trihydroxy-6-(hydroxymethyl)oxan-2-yl]oxy}oxane-2-carboxylic acid
- Other names Escin

Identifiers
CAS Number	6805-41-0 Aescin; 11072-93-8 β-Aescin
3D model (JSmol)	Interactive image
ChEMBL	ChEMBL505939
ChemSpider	4977652
ECHA InfoCard	100.027.164
KEGG	C08921
PubChem CID	6476031
UNII	RUU8G67GQM Aescin; QYK0D6H79O β-Aescin
- InChI: InChI=1S/C55H86O24/c1-10-23(2)46(71)79-43-44(72-24(3)60)55(22-59)26(17-50(43,4)5)25-11-12-30-51(6)15-14-32(52(7,21-58)29(51)13-16-53(30,8)54(25,9)18-31(55)61)75-49-41(77-48-38(67)36(65)34(63)28(20-57)74-48)39(68)40(42(78-49)45(69)70)76-47-37(66)35(64)33(62)27(19-56)73-47/h10-11,26-44,47-49,56-59,61-68H,12-22H2,1-9H3,(H,69,70)/b23-10-/t26-,27+,28+,29+,30+,31+,32-,33+,34+,35-,36-,37+,38+,39-,40-,41+,42-,43-,44-,47-,48-,49+,51-,52+,53+,54+,55-/m0/s1 Key: AXNVHPCVMSNXNP-OXPBSUTMSA-N; InChI=1/C55H86O24/c1-10-23(2)46(71)79-43-44(72-24(3)60)55(22-59)26(17-50(43,4)5)25-11-12-30-51(6)15-14-32(52(7,21-58)29(51)13-16-53(30,8)54(25,9)18-31(55)61)75-49-41(77-48-38(67)36(65)34(63)28(20-57)74-48)39(68)40(42(78-49)45(69)70)76-47-37(66)35(64)33(62)27(19-56)73-47/h10-11,26-44,47-49,56-59,61-68H,12-22H2,1-9H3,(H,69,70)/b23-10-/t26-,27+,28+,29+,30+,31+,32-,33+,34+,35-,36-,37+,38+,39-,40-,41+,42-,43-,44-,47-,48-,49+,51-,52+,53+,54+,55-/m0/s1 Key: AXNVHPCVMSNXNP-OXPBSUTMBO
- SMILES: CC=C(C)C(=O)OC1C(C2(C(CC1(C)C)C3=CCC4C5(CCC(C(C5CCC4(C3(CC2O)C)C)(C)CO)OC6C(C(C(C(O6)C(=O)O)OC7C(C(C(C(O7)CO)O)O)O)O)OC8C(C(C(C(O8)CO)O)O)O)C)CO)OC(=O)C

Properties
Chemical formula	C_{55}H_{86}O_{24}
Molar mass	1131.269 g·mol^{−1}
- Except where otherwise noted, data are given for materials in their standard state (at 25 °C [77 °F], 100 kPa). verify (what is ?) Infobox references

Aescin or escin is a mixture of saponins with anti-inflammatory, vasoconstrictor and vasoprotective effects found in Aesculus hippocastanum (the horse chestnut). Aescin is the main active component in horse chestnut, and is responsible for most of its medicinal properties. The main active compound of aescin is β-aescin, although the mixture also contains various other components including α-aescin, protoescigenin, barringtogenol, cryptoescin and benzopyrones.

Evidence suggests that aescin, especially pure β-aescin, is a safe and effective treatment for short-term treatment of chronic venous insufficiency; however, more high quality randomized controlled trials are required to confirm the effectiveness. Horse chestnut extract may be as effective and well tolerated as the use of compression stockings.

== Mechanism of action ==
Aescin appears to produce effects through a wide range of mechanisms. It induces endothelial nitric oxide synthesis by making endothelial cells more permeable to calcium ions, and also induces release of prostaglandin F_{2α}. Other possible mechanisms include serotonin antagonism and histamine antagonism and reduced catabolism of tissue mucopolysaccharides.
