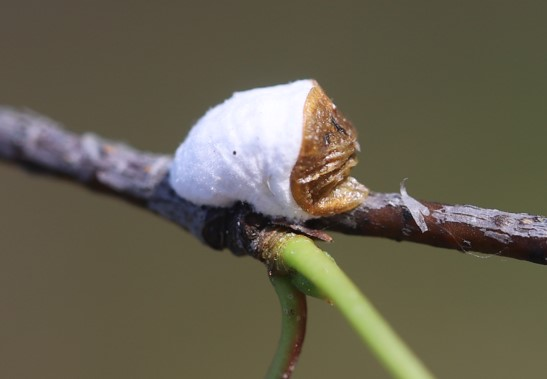

Scientific classification
- Kingdom: Animalia
- Phylum: Arthropoda
- Clade: Pancrustacea
- Class: Insecta
- Order: Hemiptera
- Suborder: Sternorrhyncha
- Family: Coccidae
- Genus: Pulvinaria
- Species: P. vitis

Binomial name
- Pulvinaria vitis (Linnaeus, 1758)

Synonyms
- List: Coccus vitis Linnaeus, 1758; Calypticus spumosus Costa, 1829; Chermes carpini (Linnaeus, 1758); Coccus carpini Linnaeus, 1758\; Pulvinaria carpini (Linnaeus, 1758); Pulvinaria vitis Ben-Dov, 1993; Pulvinaria vitis Malumphy, 1991; Pulvinaria vites Tang, 1984; Pulvinaria betulae Danzig, 1980; Pulvinaria hunteri King, 1901; Pulvinaria innumerabilis tiliae King & Cockerell, 1898; Pulvinaria tiliae King, 1901; Pulvinaria betulae alni Douglas, 1891; Pulvinaria betulae Signoret, 1873; Pulvinaria carpini Signoret, 1873; Pulvinaria oxyacanthae Signoret, 1873; Pulvinaria populi Signoret, 1873; Pulvinaria ribesiae Signoret, 1873; Pulvinaria vitis Signoret, 1873; Lecanium americanum Targioni Tozzetti, 1868; Lecanium maclurae Fitch, 1855; Pulvinaria maclurae (Fitch, 1855); Lecanium crataegi Walker, 1852; Coccus salicis Fitch, 1851; Chermes carpini Olivier, 1792; Chermes crataegi Olivier, 1792; Coccus mespili Gmelin, 1790; Coccus mespili Goeze, 1778; Coccus crataegi Fabricius, 1775; Coccus crataegi Linnaeus, 1766; Coccus betulae Linnaeus, 1758; Coccus oxyacanthae Linnaeus, 1758; Pulvinaria oxyacanthae (Linnaeus, 1758); Eulecanium maclurarum (Cockerell, 1898); Lecanium maclurarum Cockerell, 1898; Pulvinaria maclurae Cockerell, 1894

= Pulvinaria vitis =

Species of insect

Pulvinaria vitis is a species of scale insect and the type species of the genus Pulvinaria. It is found in 55 countries in Asia, Europe, and North America.
