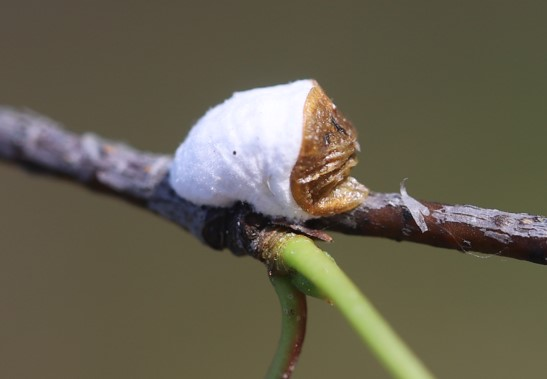
- P. vitis
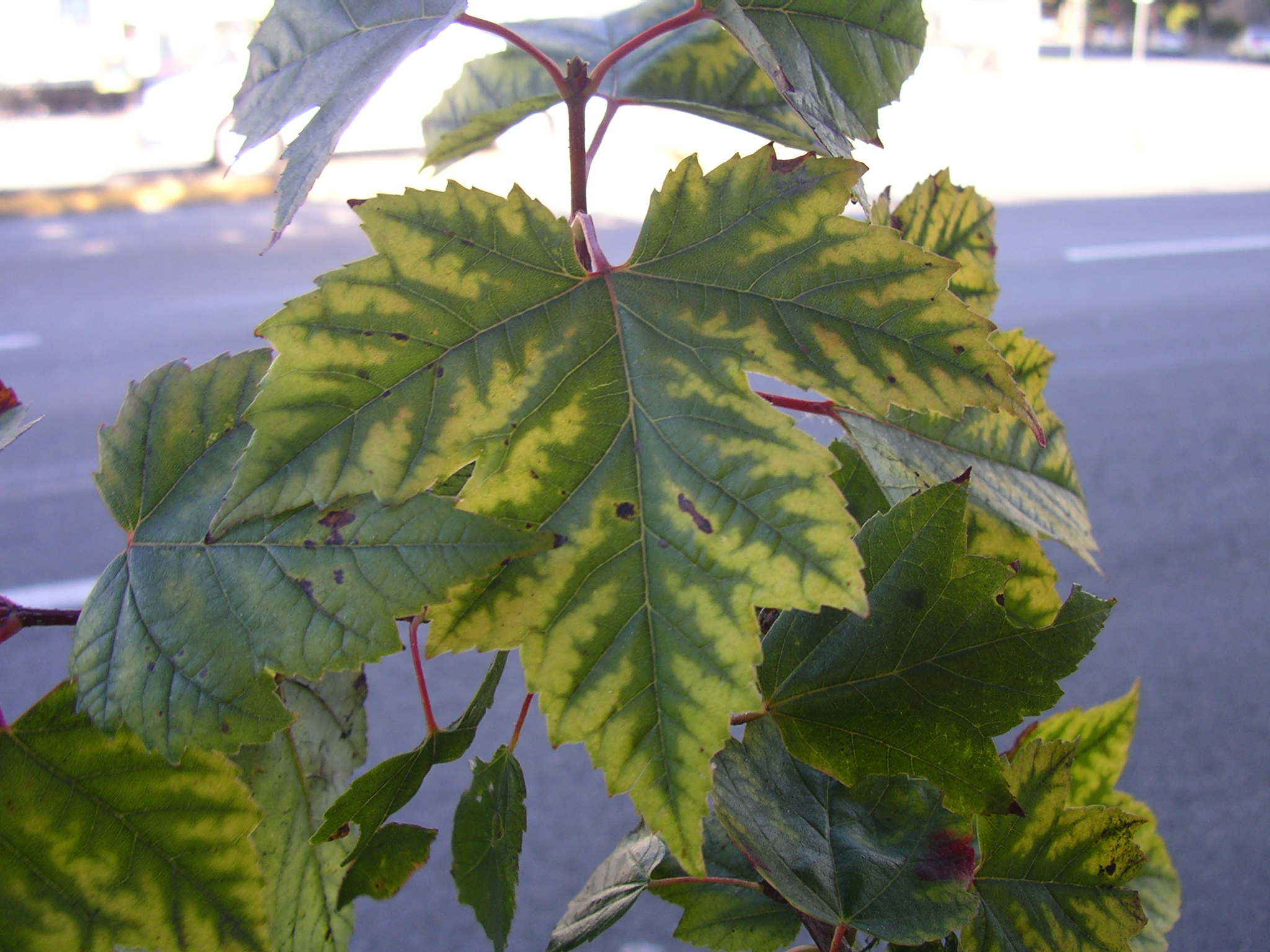
- Damage to maple by P. innumerabilis

Scientific classification
- Kingdom: Animalia
- Phylum: Arthropoda
- Clade: Pancrustacea
- Class: Insecta
- Order: Hemiptera
- Suborder: Sternorrhyncha
- Family: Coccidae
- Genus: Pulvinaria; Targioni Tozzetti, 1866

Type species
- Coccus vitis Linnaeus, 1758

Synonyms
- Chloropulvinaria Borchsenius, 1952

= Pulvinaria =

Genus of true bugs

Pulvinaria is a scale insect genus in the family Coccidae.

== Species ==
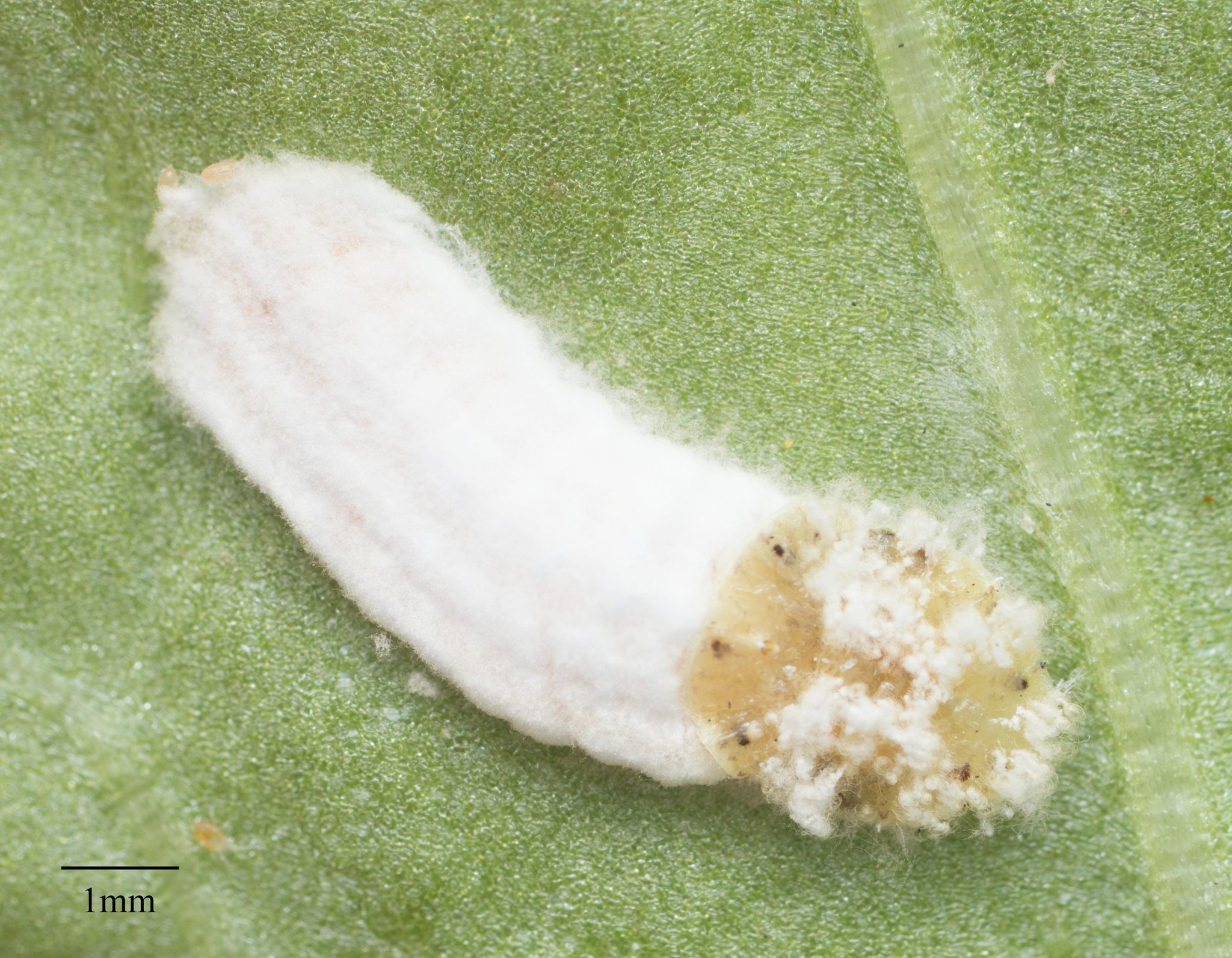
Pulvinaria floccifera

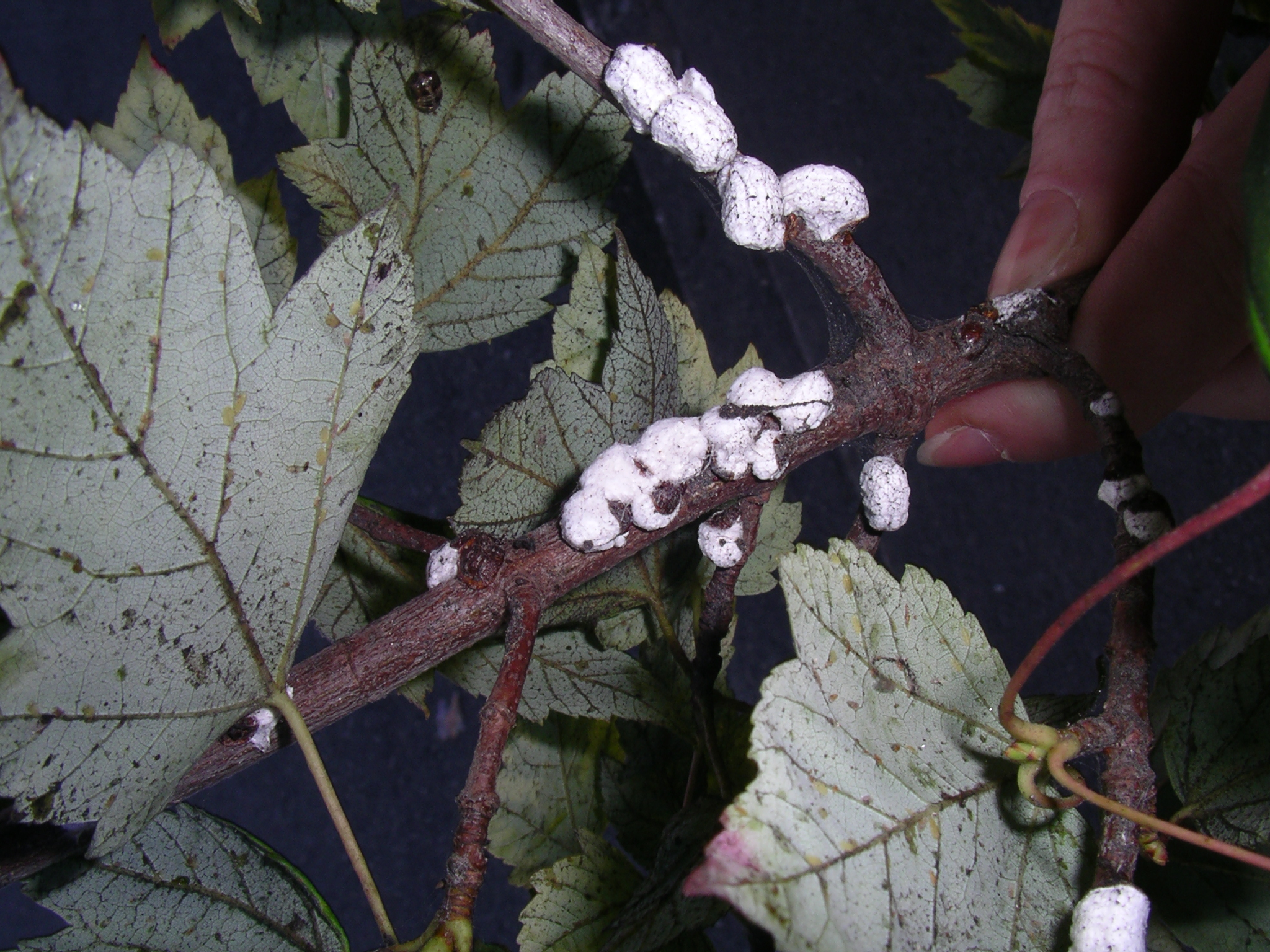
P. innumerabilis waxy egg sacs

- Pulvinaria acericola
- Pulvinaria aestivalis
- Pulvinaria aethiopica
- Pulvinaria alboinducta
- Pulvinaria aligarhensis
- Pulvinaria ampelopsidis
- Pulvinaria amygdali
- Pulvinaria aonoae
- Pulvinaria araliae
- Pulvinaria areolata
- Pulvinaria aurantii
- Pulvinaria avasthii
- Pulvinaria bambusicola
- Pulvinaria bigeloviae
- Pulvinaria borchsenii
- Pulvinaria brachiungualis
- Pulvinaria brevicornis
- Pulvinaria cacao
- Pulvinaria callosa
- Pulvinaria carieri
- Pulvinaria cestri
- Pulvinaria chrysanthemi
- Pulvinaria citricola
- Pulvinaria claviseta
- Pulvinaria coccolobae
- Pulvinaria cockerelli
- Pulvinaria convexa
- Pulvinaria corni
- Pulvinaria costata
- Pulvinaria crassispina
- Pulvinaria decorata
- Pulvinaria delottoi
- Pulvinaria dendrophthorae
- Pulvinaria depressa
- Pulvinaria dicrostachys
- Pulvinaria dodonaeae
- Pulvinaria drimyswinteri
- Pulvinaria durantae
- Pulvinaria ellesmerensis
- Pulvinaria elongata
- Pulvinaria enkianthi
- Pulvinaria ericicola
- Pulvinaria eryngii
- Pulvinaria eugeniae
- Pulvinaria euonymi
- Pulvinaria ferrisi
- Pulvinaria ficus
- Pulvinaria flava
- Pulvinaria flavescens
- Pulvinaria floccifera
- Pulvinaria fraxini
- Pulvinaria fujisana
- Pulvinaria gamazumii
- Pulvinaria glacialis
- Pulvinaria globosa
- Pulvinaria goethei
- Pulvinaria gossypii
- Pulvinaria grabhami
- Pulvinaria grandis
- Pulvinaria hakonensis
- Pulvinaria hazeae
- Pulvinaria hemiacantha
- Pulvinaria horii
- Pulvinaria hydrangeae
- Pulvinaria iceryi
- Pulvinaria idesiae
- Pulvinaria inconspiqua
- Pulvinaria indica
- Pulvinaria innumerabilis
- Pulvinaria ixorae
- Pulvinaria juglandii
- Pulvinaria justaserpentina
- Pulvinaria katsurae
- Pulvinaria kirgisica
- Pulvinaria kuwacola
- Pulvinaria lineolatae
- Pulvinaria loralaiensis
- Pulvinaria mammeae
- Pulvinaria marmorata
- Pulvinaria maskelli
- Pulvinaria merwei
- Pulvinaria mesembryanthemi
- Pulvinaria minuscula
- Pulvinaria minuta
- Pulvinaria mkuzei
- Pulvinaria myricariae
- Pulvinaria neocellulosa
- Pulvinaria nishigaharae
- Pulvinaria obscura
- Pulvinaria occidentalis
- Pulvinaria ochnaceae
- Pulvinaria okitsuensis
- Pulvinaria ornata
- Pulvinaria oyamae
- Pulvinaria paranaensis
- Pulvinaria peninsularis
- Pulvinaria peregrina
- Pulvinaria persicae
- Pulvinaria phaiae
- Pulvinaria photiniae
- Pulvinaria platensis
- Pulvinaria plucheae
- Pulvinaria polygonata
- Pulvinaria populeti
- Pulvinaria portblairensis
- Pulvinaria pruni
- Pulvinaria psidii
- Pulvinaria pulchra
- Pulvinaria randiae
- Pulvinaria regalis
- Pulvinaria rehi
- Pulvinaria rhizophila
- Pulvinaria rhoicina
- Pulvinaria rhois
- Pulvinaria saccharia
- Pulvinaria salicicola
- Pulvinaria salicis
- Pulvinaria salicorniae
- Pulvinaria satoi
- Pulvinaria savescui
- Pulvinaria sericea
- Pulvinaria shinjii
- Pulvinaria simplex
- Pulvinaria simulans
- Pulvinaria sorghicola
- Pulvinaria subterranea
- Pulvinaria taiwana
- Pulvinaria tapiae
- Pulvinaria tenuivalvata
- Pulvinaria terrestris
- Pulvinaria tessellata
- Pulvinaria thompsoni
- Pulvinaria tomentosa
- Pulvinaria torreyae
- Pulvinaria tremulae
- Pulvinaria tromelini
- Pulvinaria tuberculata
- Pulvinaria tyleri
- Pulvinaria uapacae
- Pulvinaria urbicola
- Pulvinaria vangueriae
- Pulvinaria viburni
- Pulvinaria vini
- Pulvinaria vinifera
- Pulvinaria vitis
