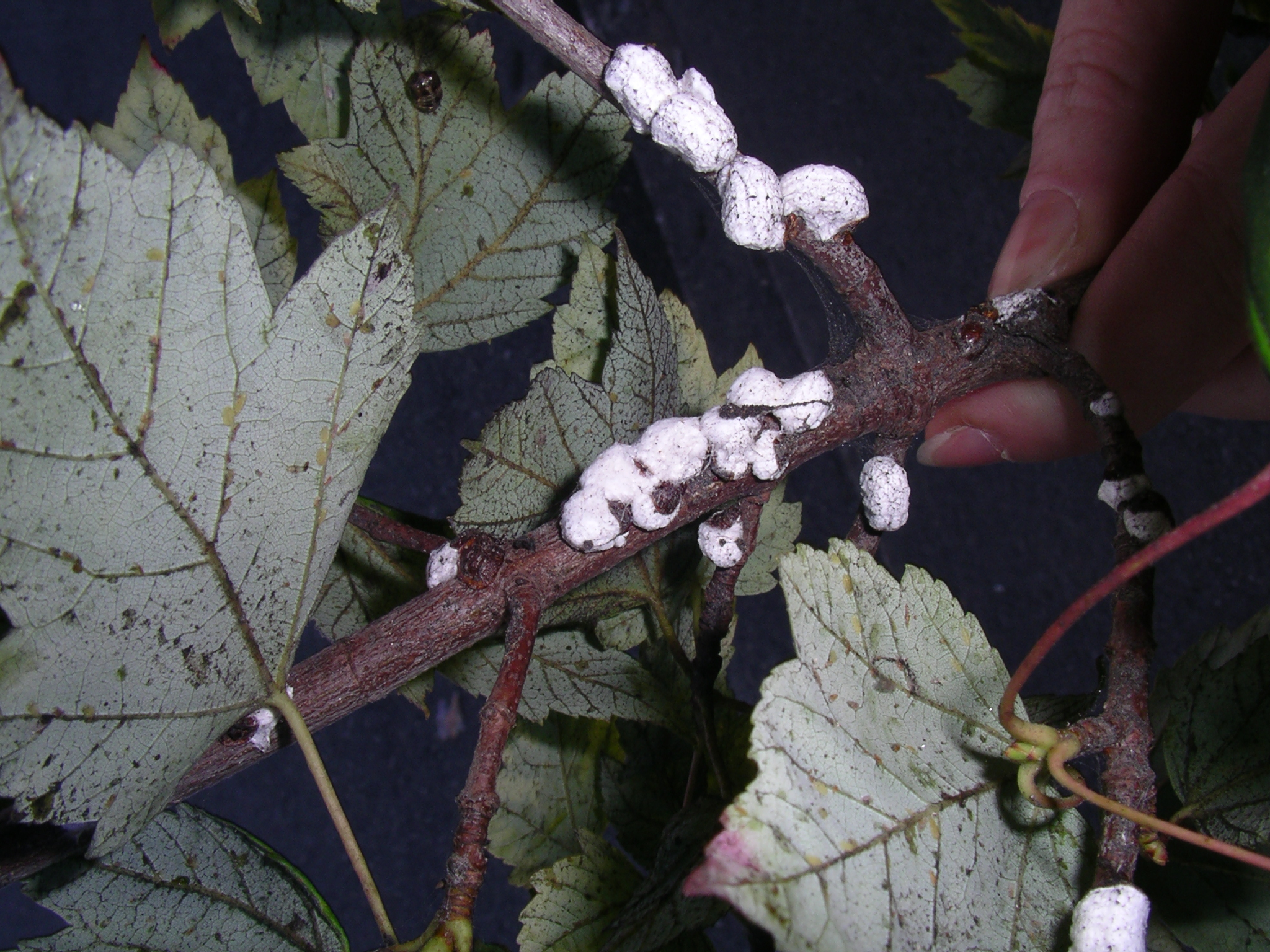
- P. innumerabilis waxy egg sacs

Scientific classification
- Kingdom: Animalia
- Phylum: Arthropoda
- Clade: Pancrustacea
- Class: Insecta
- Order: Hemiptera
- Suborder: Sternorrhyncha
- Family: Coccidae
- Genus: Pulvinaria
- Species: P. innumerabilis

Binomial name
- Pulvinaria innumerabilis (Rathvon, 1854)

= Pulvinaria innumerabilis =

Species of true bug

Pulvinaria innumerabilis (cottony maple scale) is a small, flattened, brown scale insect about 1/8" long. In early summer mature females begin to secrete white, waxy, cottony-appearing egg sacs in which they lay as many as 1,500 eggs. Severely infested trees look like they are covered with strings of popcorn.

P. innumerabilis can be found on all species of maples (Acer spp.) but have a strong preference for silver maple. It is also known to be able to survive on honey and black locust, white ash, burning-bush, oak, boxelder, dogwood, hackberry, sycamore, beech, elm, willow, basswood, and poplar.

== Damage symptoms ==
While conspicuous, P. innumerabilis infestations usually have little impact on established trees. However, in large numbers they can cause premature leaf drop and twig dieback. Heavy infestations can cause leaves to turn yellow to light green and may cause stunted leaf growth.

== Gallery ==
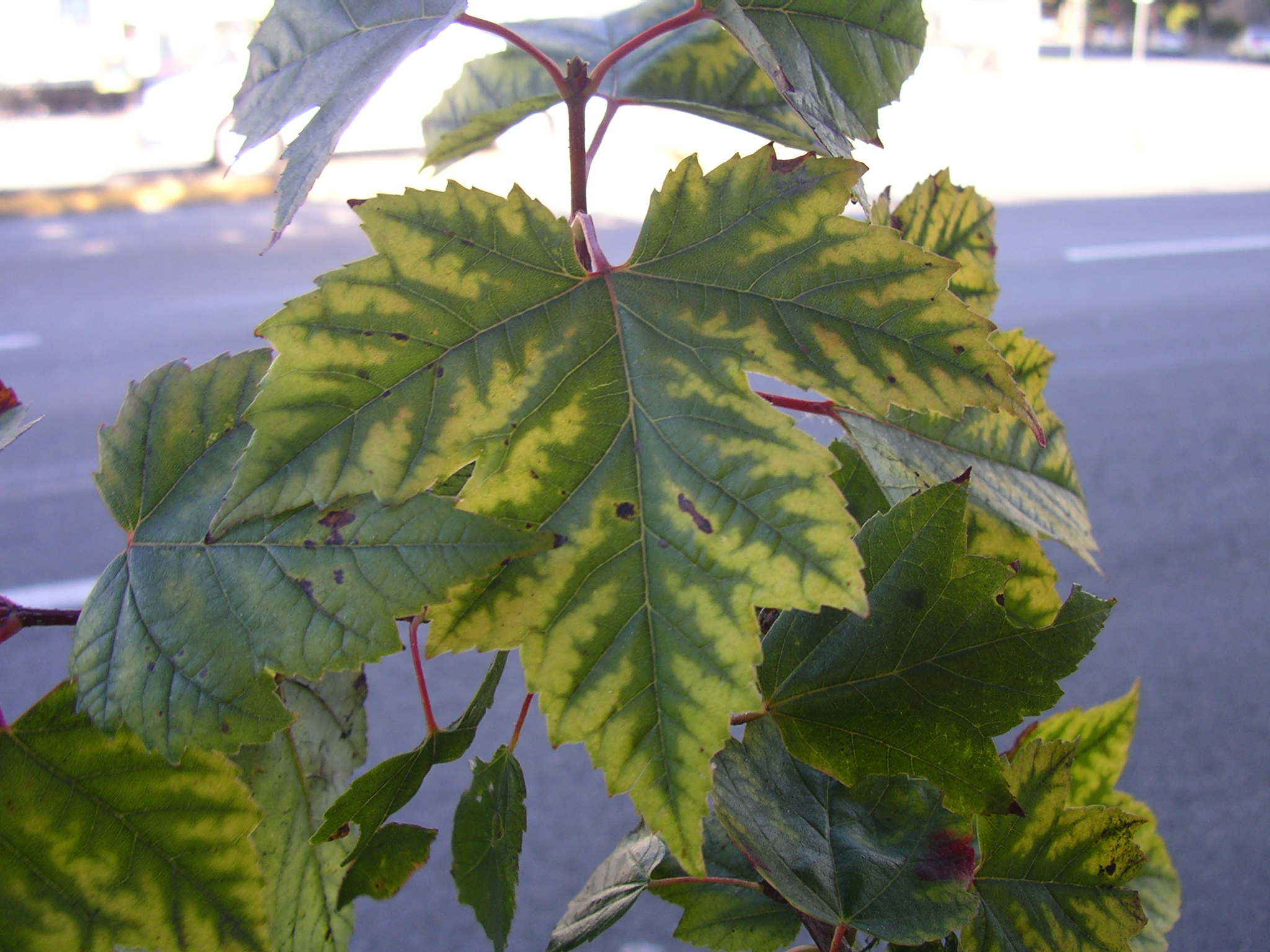
Damage to maple

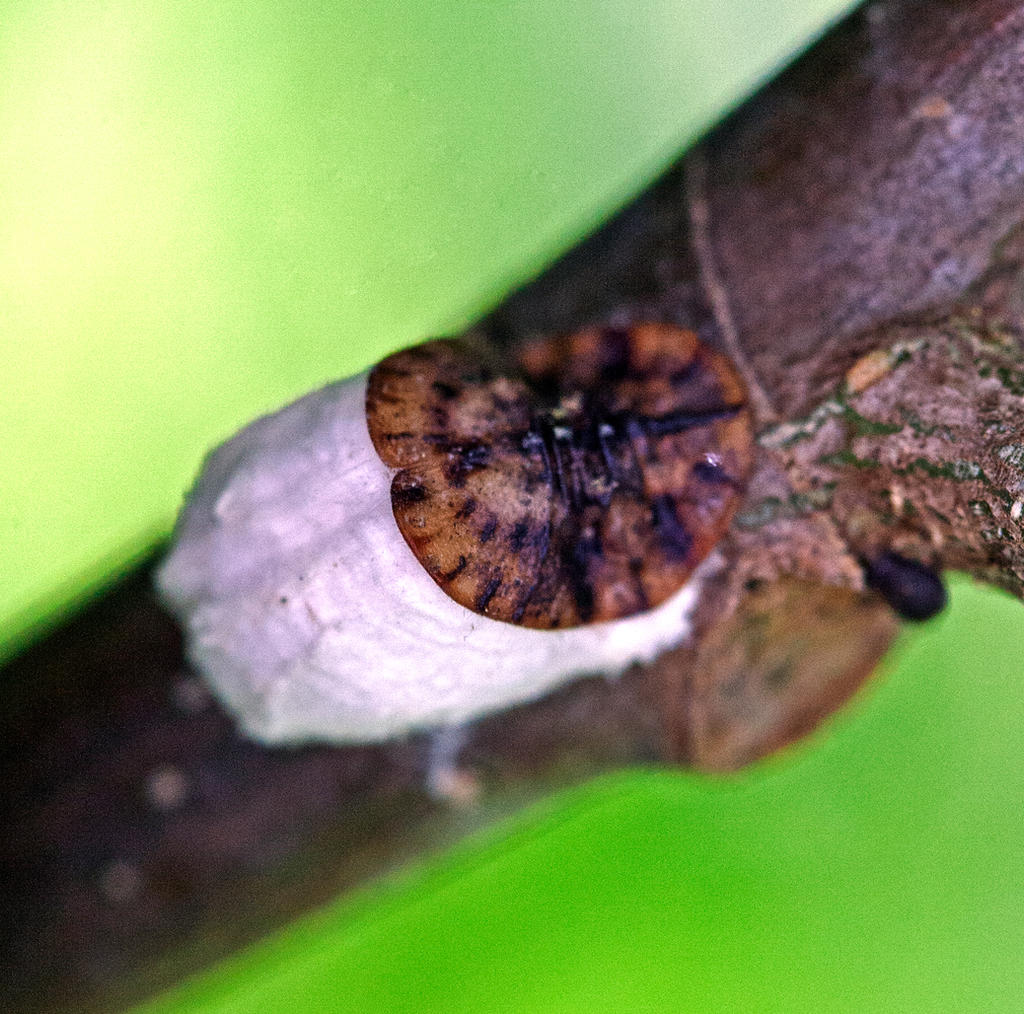
Cottony maple scale(Pulvinaria innumerabilis)
