= Benzopyrone =

Benzopyrone may refer to either of two ketone derivatives of benzopyran which constitute the core skeleton of many flavonoid compounds:

- Chromone (1-benzopyran-4-one)
- Coumarin (1-benzopyran-2-one)

Certain simple benzopyrones have clinical medical value as an edema modifiers. Coumarin and other benzopyrones, such as 5,6 benzopyrone, 1,2 benzopyrone, diosmin and others are known to stimulate macrophages to degrade extracellular albumin, allowing faster resorption of edematous fluids.

Naturally occurring coumarin is also the basis for various 4-hydroxybenzopyrone-based molecules which occur naturally dicoumarol and are made synthetically warfarin and function as anticoagulants.
