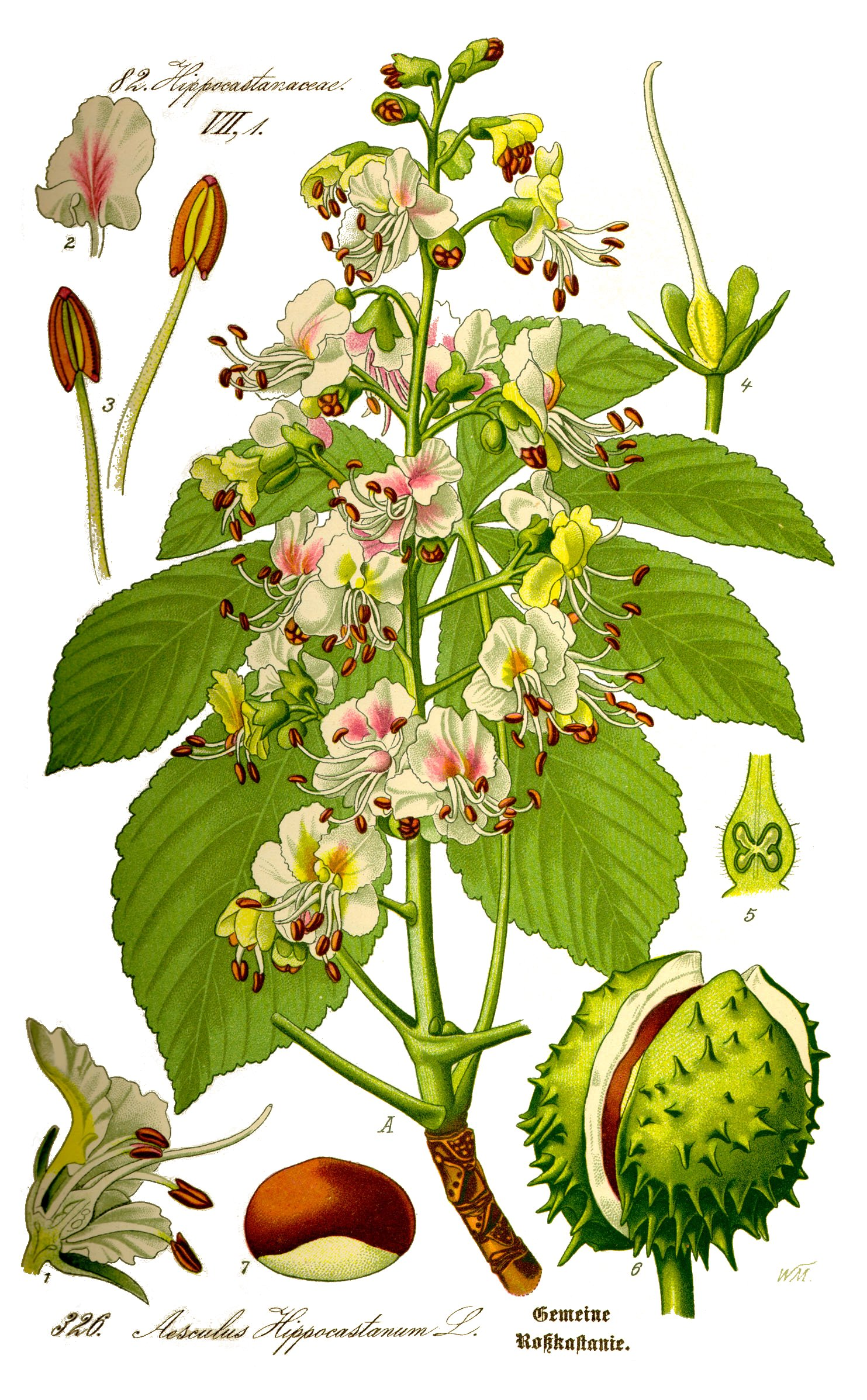
- Botanical illustration (1885)

Conservation status
- Vulnerable (IUCN 3.1)

Scientific classification
- Kingdom: Plantae
- Clade: Tracheophytes
- Clade: Angiosperms
- Clade: Eudicots
- Clade: Rosids
- Order: Sapindales
- Family: Sapindaceae
- Genus: Aesculus
- Species: A. hippocastanum

Binomial name
- Aesculus hippocastanum L.

= Aesculus hippocastanum =

Species of tree in the soapberry family

Aesculus hippocastanum, the horse chestnut, is a species of flowering plant in the maple, soapberry and lychee family Sapindaceae. It is a large, deciduous, synoecious (hermaphroditic-flowered) tree. It is also called horse-chestnut, European horsechestnut, buckeye, and conker tree. It is not to be confused with the sweet chestnut or Spanish chestnut, Castanea sativa, which is a tree in another family, Fagaceae.

== Description ==
Aesculus hippocastanum is a large tree, growing to about 39 m (128 ft) tall with a domed crown of stout branches. On old trees, the outer branches are often pendulous with curled-up tips. The leaves are opposite and palmately compound, with 5–7 leaflets 13–30 cm (5–12 in) long, making the whole leaf up to 60 cm (24 in) across, with a 7–20 cm (3–8 in) petiole. The leaf scars, left on twigs after leaves fall, have a distinctive horseshoe shape, complete with seven "nails".

In late spring, polygamomonoecious erect panicles of about 4–5 flowers bloom from jointed pedicels. The petals are usually white with a yellow to pink blotch at the base. The pollen is not poisonous for honey bees. Usually only 1–5 fruits develop on each panicle. The shell is a green, spiky capsule containing one (rarely two or three) nut-like seeds called conkers or horse-chestnuts. Each conker is 2–4 cm (0.8–1.6 in) in diameter, glossy nut-brown with a whitish scar at the base.

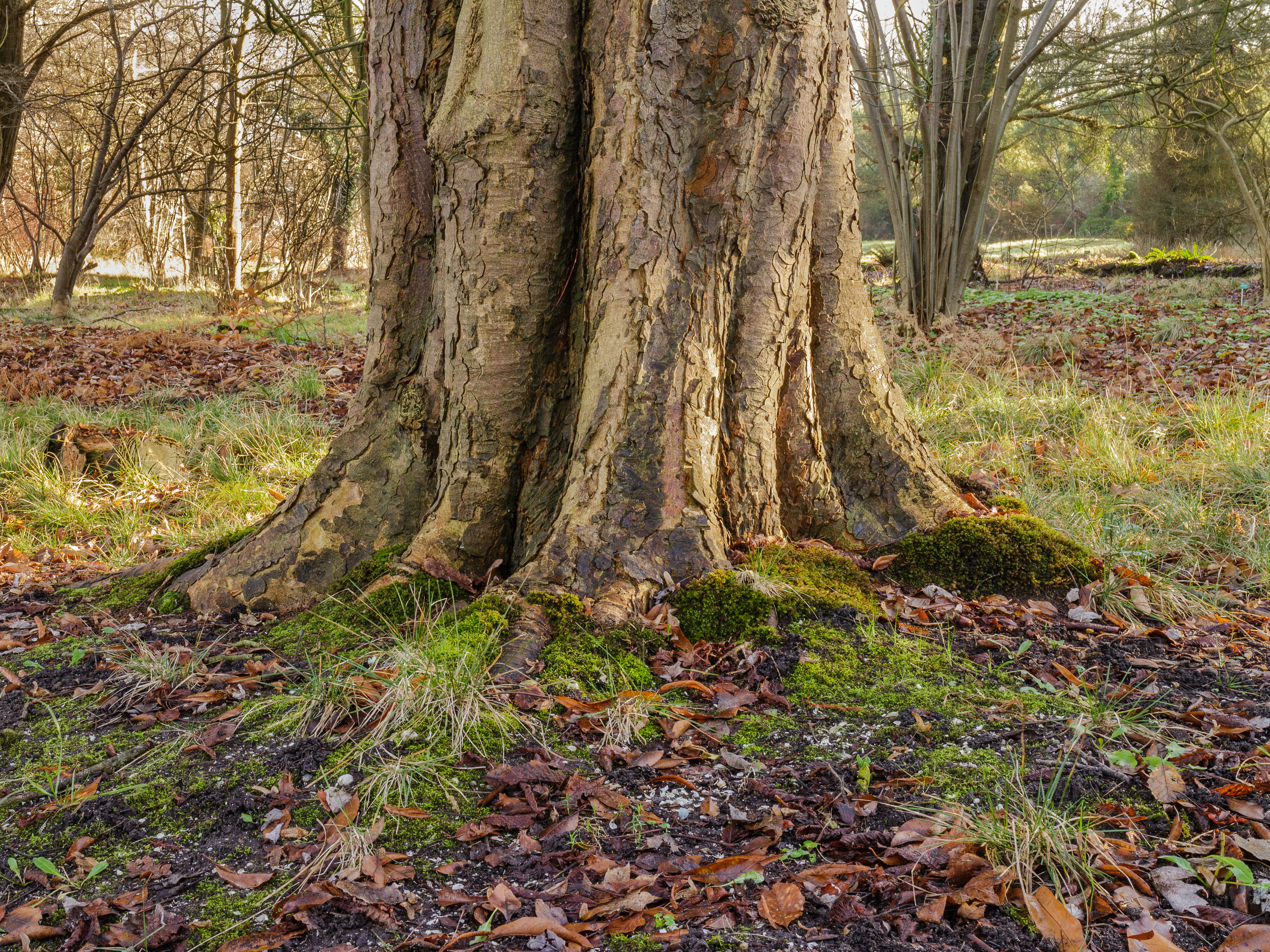
Trunk and root

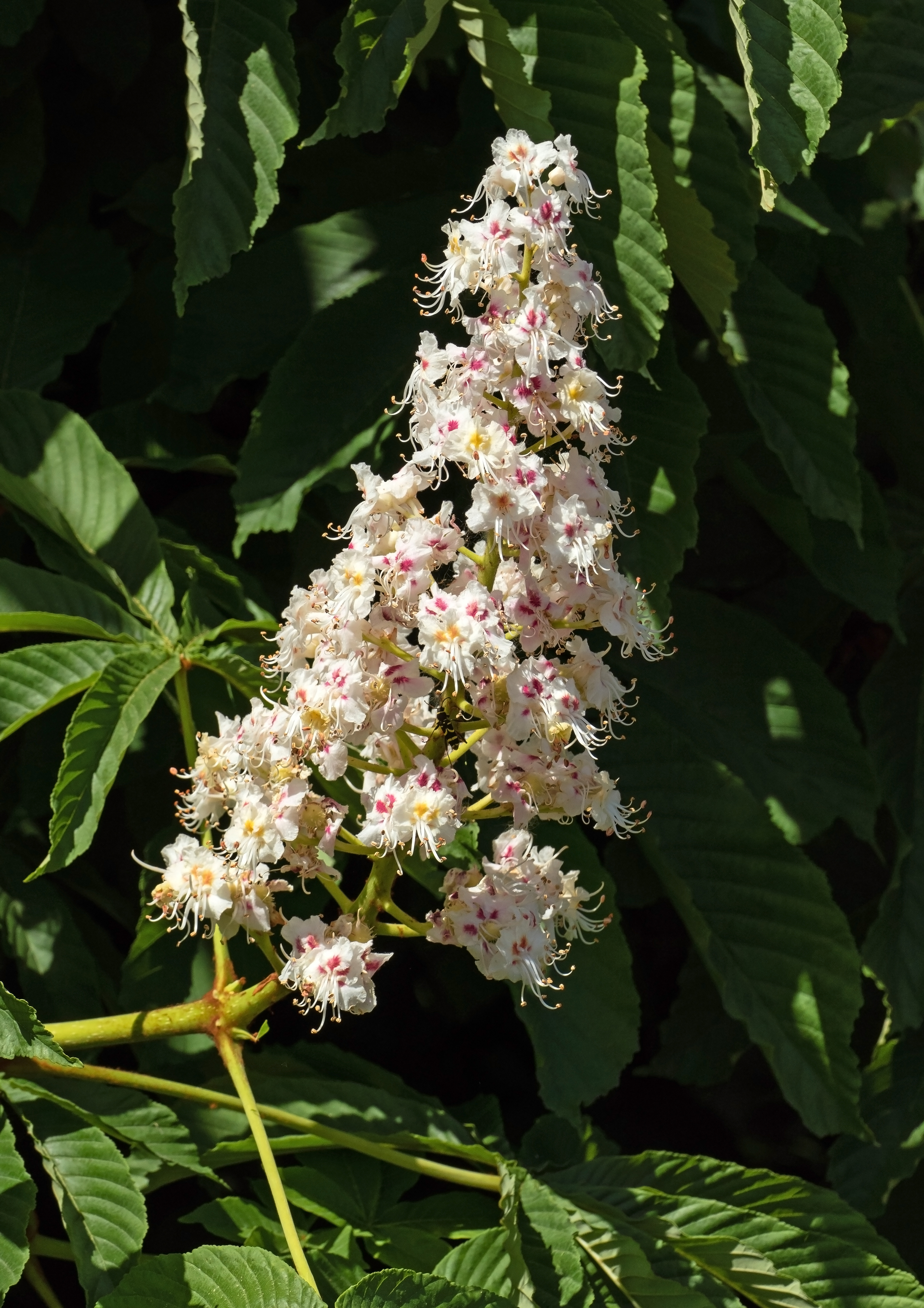
Inflorescence

Floral diagram. The light green structure denotes nectary. Floral formula: ↘ K5 C2:2 A5+2 G(3).

== Etymology ==
The common name horse chestnut originates from the similarity of the leaves and fruits to sweet chestnuts, Castanea sativa (a tree in a different family, the Fagaceae), together with the alleged observation that the fruit or seeds could help panting or coughing horses.

Although it is sometimes known as buckeye, for the resemblance of the seed to a deer's eye, the term buckeye is more commonly used for New World members of the genus Aesculus, such as Aesculus glabra.

== Distribution and habitat ==
The native distribution of Aesculus hippocastanum given by different sources varies. As of March 2023, Plants of the World Online considered it to be native to the Balkans (Albania, Bulgaria, Greece and former Yugoslavia), but also to Turkey and Turkmenistan. A 2017 assessment for the IUCN Red List restricted the native distribution to the Balkan area: Albania, Bulgaria, mainland Greece and North Macedonia. It has been introduced and planted around the world. It can be found in many parts of Europe as far north as Harstad north of the Arctic Circle in Norway, and Gästrikland in Sweden as well as in many parks and cities around the northern United States and Canada such as Edmonton in Alberta.

The compact native population of horse chestnut in Bulgaria is distinct from the horse chestnut forests of northern Greece, western North Macedonia and Albania. It is limited to an area of 9 ha (22 acres) in the Preslav Mountain north of the Balkan Mountains, in the valleys of the Dervishka and Lazarska rivers. Bulgaria's relict horse chestnut forests are critically endangered at the national level and protected as part of the Dervisha Managed Nature Reserve.

== Ecology ==
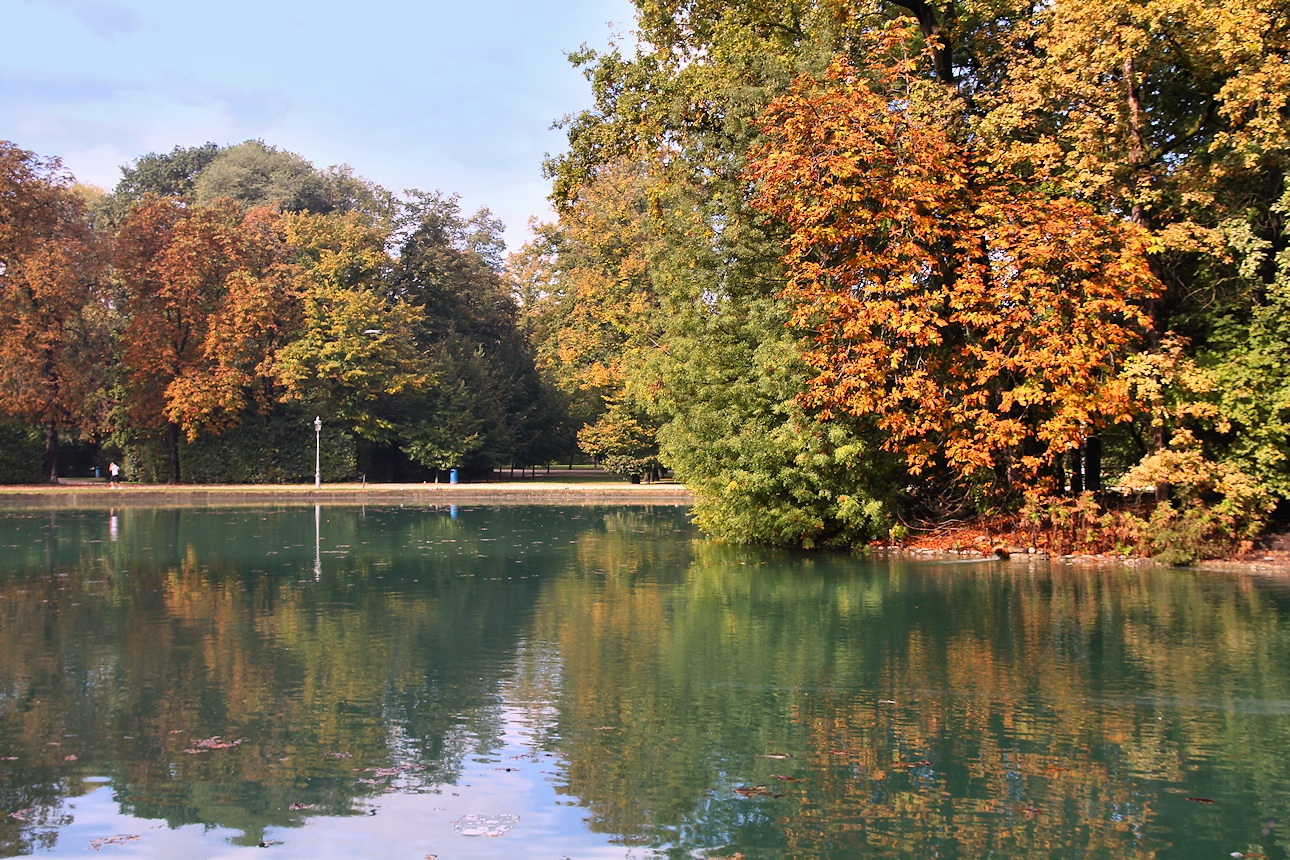
Horse-chestnut leaf miner (Cameraria ohridella) tree damage in Parma, Italy

Aesculus hippocastanum is affected by the leaf-mining moth Cameraria ohridella, whose larvae feed on horse chestnut leaves, causing premature colour changes and leaf loss. The moth was described from North Macedonia where the species was discovered in 1984 but took 18 years to reach Britain.

Other diseases include:

- Bleeding canker. Half of all horse-chestnuts in Great Britain are now showing symptoms to some degree of this potentially lethal bacterial infection.
- Guignardia leaf blotch, caused by the fungus Guignardia aesculi
- Wood rotting fungi such as Armillaria and Ganoderma
- Horse chestnut scale, caused by the insect Pulvinaria regalis
- Phytophthora bleeding canker, a fungal infection

The seeds are claimed to repel spiders, but there is little evidence to support this. The presence of saponin may repel insects, but it is not clear whether this is effective on spiders.

== Cultivation ==
It is widely cultivated in streets and parks throughout the temperate world, and has been particularly successful in places like Ireland, Great Britain and New Zealand, where it is commonly found in parks, streets and avenues. Cultivation for its spectacular spring flowers is successful in a wide range of temperate climatic conditions provided summers are not too hot, with trees being grown as far north as Edmonton, Alberta, Canada, the Faroe Islands, Reykjavík, Iceland and Harstad, Norway.

The horse-chestnut is a favorite subject for bonsai.

== Toxicity ==
Aescin

Raw horse chestnut seed, leaf, bark and flower are toxic due to the presence of aesculin and should not be ingested. Horse chestnut seed is classified by the US Food and Drug Administration as an unsafe herb. The glycoside and saponin constituents are considered toxic.

The seeds, especially those that are young and fresh, are slightly poisonous, containing alkaloid saponins and glucosides. Although not dangerous to touch, they cause sickness when eaten; consumed by horses, they can cause tremors and lack of coordination.

There is risk of kidney disease. When patients who had undergone cardiac surgery (i.e. to prevent postoperative oedema) were intravenously given high doses of aescin (escin), horse chestnut's main active ingredient, no alteration in kidney function was recorded with 340 μg/kg, mild kidney function impairment resulted from 360 μg/kg, and acute kidney injury developed with 510 μg/kg.

== Uses ==
Prior to the advent of mechanical refrigeration, German beer brewers would dig cellars for lagering and plant horse chestnut trees to further protect them from the summer heat due to their dense canopies and shallow roots. The practice of serving beer at these sites evolved into the modern beer garden.

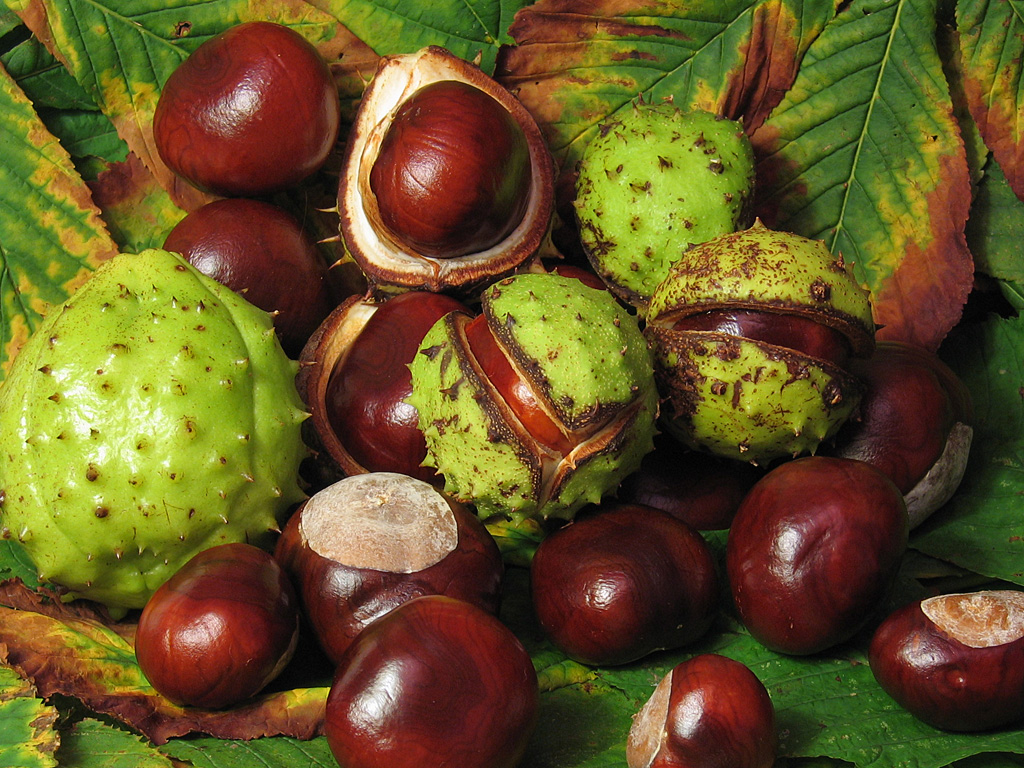
A selection of fresh conkers

In Britain and Ireland, the seeds are used for the popular children's game conkers. During World War I, there was a campaign to ask for everyone (including children) to collect the seeds and donate them to the government. The conkers were used as a source of starch for fermentation using the Clostridium acetobutylicum method devised by Chaim Weizmann to produce acetone for use as a solvent for the production of cordite, which was then used in military armaments. Weizmann's process could use any source of starch, but the government chose to ask for conkers to avoid causing starvation by depleting food sources. Conkers were found to be a poor source and the factory only produced acetone for three months, but they were collected again during World War II for the same reason.

Conkers can be used to produce homemade laundry detergent.

=== In medicine ===
The seed extract standardized to around 20 percent aescin is possibly useful in traditional medicine for its effect on venous tone.

A 2012 Cochrane Review of low-quality studies suggested that horse chestnut seed extract may be an efficacious and safe short-term treatment for chronic venous insufficiency, but definitive randomized controlled trials had not been conducted to confirm the efficacy.

== In culture ==
A horse-chestnut tree stood outside the window of the "secret annex" in the centre of Amsterdam and was mentioned by Anne Frank in her diary. The tree survived until August 2010, when a heavy wind blew it over. Eleven young specimens, sprouted from seeds from this tree, were transported to the US. After a long quarantine in Indianapolis, each tree was shipped off to a new home at a notable museum or institution in the US, such as 9/11 Memorial Park, Little Rock Central High School, and two Holocaust Centers. One of them was planted outdoors in March 2013 in front of The Children's Museum of Indianapolis, where they were originally quarantined.

The horse chestnut tree is one of the symbols of Kyiv, the capital of Ukraine.
