= List of introduced species =

A complete list of introduced species for even quite small areas of the world would be dauntingly long. Humans have introduced more different species to new environments than any single document can record. This list is generally for established species with truly wild populations— not kept domestically, that have been seen numerous times, and have breeding populations. While most introduced species can cause a negative impact to new environments they reach, some can have a positive impact, just for conservation purpose.

== Antarctica ==
=== Insects ===
- Eretmoptera murphyi (midge) on Signy Island

== Australia ==
=== Mammals ===
- Platypus in Kangaroo Island
- Koala in South Australia
- Tasmanian devil in New South Wales (reintroduced)
- Water buffalo
- Cattle (cows)
- Sheep
- Pig
- Dromedary
- Red deer from Europe
- Fallow deer from Europe
- Chital
- Indian hog deer
- Javan rusa
- Sambar deer
- Donkey
- Brumby
- Banteng
- Goat
- Brown hare
- Red fox
- Dog
- Cat
- House mouse
- Northern palm squirrel - established in Perth
- European rabbit from Europe
- Rats
  - Black rat
  - Brown rat

=== Birds ===
- Acridotheres tristis (common myna)
- Alauda arvensis (Eurasian skylark)
- Anas platyrhynchos (mallard)
- Cacatua galerita (sulphur-crested cockatoo) - Western Australia from east Australia
- Cacatua tenuirostris (long-billed corella) - to coastal areas from inland
- Callipepla californica (California quail)
- Carduelis carduelis (European goldfinch)
- Cereopsis novaehollandiae (Cape Barren goose) - reintroduced onto Australian islands
- Chloris chloris (European greenfinch)
- Cygnus olor (mute swan)
- Dacelo novaeguineae (laughing kookaburra) - artificially expanded range
- Dromaius novaehollandiae (emu) - reintroduced onto Australian islands
- Columba livia (feral pigeon)
- Australian brushturkey in Kangaroo Island
- Gallus gallus (red junglefowl)
- Gallus varius (green junglefowl) on Cocos (Keeling) Islands
- Padda oryzivora (Java sparrow) - Cocos (Keeling) Islands and Christmas Island
- Lonchura punctulata (nutmeg mannikin)
- Meleagris gallopavo (wild turkey)
- Menura novaehollandiae (superb lyrebird) - Tasmania from mainland
- Numida meleagris (helmeted guineafowl)
- Passer domesticus (house sparrow)
- Passer montanus (Eurasian tree sparrow)
- Pavo cristatus (Indian peafowl)
- Phasianus colchicus (common pheasant)
- Pycnonotus jocosus (red-whiskered bulbul)
- Spilopelia chinensis (spotted dove)
- Spilopelia senegalensis (laughing dove)
- Struthio camelus (ostrich)
- Sturnus vulgaris (common starling)
- Gang-gang cockatoo in Kangaroo Island
- Trichoglossus moluccanus (rainbow lorikeet) – to Western Australia from east Australia
- Turdus merula (Eurasian blackbird)
- Turdus philomelos (song thrush)
- Tyto novaehollandiae (Australian masked owl) - Lord Howe Island from mainland
- Zosterops natalis (Christmas white-eye) - Cocos (Keeling) Islands

=== Fish ===
- Acanthogobius flavimanus
- Asian carp
- Astronotus ocellatus (oscar)
- Brook trout
- Brown trout
- Chameleon goby
- Common carp
- Common roach
- Eastern mosquitofish
- European perch
- Goldfish
- Green swordtail
- Jack Dempsey
- Mozambique tilapia
- Convict cichlid
- Pearl cichlid
- Pelmatolapia mariae (spotted tilapia)
- Pond loach
- Rainbow trout
- Rosy barb
- Rudd
- Southern platyfish/Variatus platy
- Tench
- White Cloud Mountain minnow
- Siamese fighting fish

=== Reptiles ===
- House gecko
- Trachemys scripta elegans (red-eared slider)

=== Amphibians ===
- Cane toad

=== Arthropods ===
- Argentine ant
- Black Portuguese millipede
- Western honeybee
- Red imported fire ant from South America via North America
- Yellow crazy ant
- Pharaoh ant
- European wasp
- Silverleaf whitefly
- Carcinus maenas
- Paratrechina Longicornis (Longhorn crazy ant)
- Apis Cerana (Eastern Honey Bee)
- Aedes albopictus (tiger mosquito)
- Aethina tumida (small hive beetle)
- Aphis spiraecola (green citrus aphid)
- Bactrocera cucurbitae (melon fly)
- Bruchophagus roddi (alfalfa seed chalcid)
- Cerataphis lataniae (palm aphid)
- Ceratitis capitata (Mediterranean fruit fly)
- Corythucha ciliata (sycamore lace bug)
- Cryptotermes brevis (West Indian drywood termite)
- Diuraphis noxia (Russian wheat aphid)
- Forficula auricularia (common earwig)
- Frankliniella occidentalis (western flower thrips)
- Hylurgus ligniperda (red-haired pine bark beetle)
- Idioscopus nitidulus (mango leafhopper)
- Maconellicoccus hirsutus (hibiscus mealybug)
- Pheidole megacephala (coastal brown ant)
- Phylacteophaga froggatti (leafblister sawfly)
- Pineus pini (pine adelgid)
- Sitobion miscanthi (Indian grain aphid)
- Solenopsis geminata (ginger ant)
- Spodoptera litura (Oriental leafworm moth)
- Tapinoma melanocephalum (ghost ant)
- Tremex fuscicornis (tremex wasp)
- Trichomyrmex destructor (destructive trailing ant)
- Vespula vulgaris (common wasp)
- Wasmannia auropunctata (electric ant)
- Xanthogaleruca luteola (elm-leaf beetle)
- Xyleborinus saxesenii (fruit-tree pinhole borer)

=== Molluscs ===
- Asian trampsnail
- Cernuella virgata
- Cochlicella acuta
- Cochlicella barbara
- Cornu aspersum
- Maoricolpus roseus
- Theba pisana
- Deroceras invadens (tramp slug)
- Deroceras laeve (marsh slug)
- Arcuatula senhousia
- Pacific oyster
- Perna viridis

=== Echinoderms ===
- Northern Pacific seastar

=== Worms ===
- Sabella spallanzanii

=== Plants ===
Around 15% of Australia's flora is made up of introduced species. The following is a non-inclusive list of some of the more significant plant species.

- Bridal creeper
- Purple viper's-bugloss (locally nicknamed "patterson's curse")
- Koster's curse – Clidemia hirta
- Cotton thistle
- Lantana
- Bitou bush
- Monterey pine (established from forestry plantations)
- Cestrum nocturnum

== British Isles and other European islands ==
Further information can be found at the GB non-native species secretariat, which has a free tool kit of resources on non-native species, including a photo gallery, ID sheets, risk assessments, projects database, case studies and resources for local action groups.

=== Mammals ===
- Gray squirrel from North America
- Greater white-toothed shrew from mainland Europe and Africa
- Erinaceus europaeus (European hedgehog) - Uist
- Feral horse from mainland Europe
- Equus asinus (donkey) - Cyprus
- Feral cat from mainland Europe
- Brown rat
- Black rat
- House mouse
- Bank vole introduced to Ireland from the UK
- Edible dormouse from continental Europe
- Ferret from continental Europe to various islands around the British isles
- European rabbit from continental Europe
- Brown hare from continental Europe
- American mink from North America
- Reeves's muntjac from China
- Fallow deer from continental Europe
- Sika deer from Asia
- Water deer
- Reindeer - Iceland
- Feral goat
  - Kashmir goat in Great Orme
- Bennett's wallaby from Australia
- South American coati from South America (occasional escaped pets; not established)
- Striped skunk from North America (occasional escaped pets; not established)
- Raccoon dog (occasional escaped pets; not established)

=== Birds ===
- Tetrao urogallus (western capercaillie) - reintroduced into Scotland
- Tetrao tetrix (black grouse) - reintroduced into parts of England
- Lagopus scotica (red grouse) - reintroduced into southern England (Dartmoor)
- Red-legged partridge
- Golden pheasant from Asia (now died out)
- Common pheasant
- Anser anser (greylag goose) - reintroduced over England, Wales, and Ireland
- Canada goose
- Barnacle goose (native as winter visitor from Arctic; also introduced as a breeding bird)
- Egyptian goose from Africa
- Mandarin duck from Japan and China
- Ruddy duck from North America (now largely eradicated)
- Cairina moschata (Muscovy duck) (occasional; not widely established)
- Netta rufina (red-crested pochard)
- Columba livia (rock dove) (native, but also widely feral)
- Haliaeetus albicilla (white-tailed eagle) - reintroduced
- Pandion haliaetus (osprey) - recolonised Scotland naturally, reintroduced into southern England from Scotland
- Little owl from mainland Europe
- Rose-ringed parakeet from Asia
- Monk parakeet from South America
- Acridotheres tristis (common myna) - Balearic Islands

=== Fish ===
- Zander
- Wels catfish
- Rainbow trout
- Walleye
- Bitterling
- Bluegill
- Brook trout
- Common carp
- Black bullhead
- Goldfish
- Grass carp
- Orfe
- Pumpkinseed
- Topmouth gudgeon
- Sunbleak
- Fathead minnow
- Pink salmon (humpback salmon)
- Alburnus alburnus (common bleak) Cyprus
- Gambusia holbrooki (eastern mosquitofish) Cyprus, Corsica
- Leuciscus leuciscus (common dace) Ireland
- Pseudorasbora parva (stone moroko)
- Rutilus rutilus (common roach) Ireland

=== Amphibians ===
- Alpine newt
- Midwife toad
- Yellow-bellied toad
- Marsh frog
- African clawed frog
- European tree frog
- Pelophylax esculentus (edible frog)

=== Reptiles ===
- Aesculapian snake
- European pond terrapin
- Pond slider
- Common wall lizard
- Western green lizard

=== Crustaceans ===
- Signal crayfish
- Chinese mitten crab
- Killer shrimp
- Chelicorophium curvispinum (Caspian mud shrimp)
- Elminius modestus (Australasian barnacle)
- Hemimysis anomala (bloody-red mysid)
- Orconectes virilis (Virile crayfish)

=== Insects ===
- Asian giant hornet
- Stick insects
- Aphis spiraecola (green citrus aphid) Mediterranean Islands
- Ceratitis capitata (Mediterranean fruit fly) Mediterranean Islands
- Cinara cupressi (Cypress aphid)
- Corythucha ciliata (sycamore lace bug)
- Ctenarytaina eucalypti (blue gum psyllid)
- Dreyfusia nordmannianae (silver fir adelges)
- Drosophila suzukii (spotted wing drosophila) Mediterranean Islands
- Frankliniella occidentalis (western flower thrips)
- Gilpinia hercyniae (European spruce sawfly)
- Hypogeococcus pungens (cactus mealybug) Corsica
- Icerya purchasi (cottony cushion scale)
- Thaumastocoris peregrinus (bronze bug) Sicily
- Vespula germanica (European wasp) Malta
- Vespula vulgaris (common wasp) Iceland

==== Butterflies and moths ====
- Large blue butterfly from Sweden
- Psychoides filicivora moth from the Far East
- Azalea leaf miner moth from East Asia
- Argyresthia cupressella moth from United States
- Brown house moth from Asia
- Tachystola acroxantha moth from Australia
- Coleotechnites piceaella moth from United States
- Cotoneaster webworm moth from United States
- Blastobasis adustella moth
- Blastobasis lacticolella moth
- Adoxophyles oporana moth
- Carnation tortrix
- Light brown apple moth Epiphyas postvittana from Australia
- Codling moth
- Cameraria ohridella (horse-chestnut leaf miner)
- Cydalima perspectalis (box tree moth)
- Thaumetopoea processionea (oak processionary)
- Paysandisia archon (castniid palm borer) Mediterranean Islands

==== Ants ====
- Pharaoh ant from United States
- Crematogaster scutellaris (cork ant)
- Lasius neglectus
- Linepithema humile (Argentine ant)
- Paratrechina longicornis (longhorn crazy ant)
- Pheidole megacephala (big-headed ant)
- Tapinoma melanocephalum (ghost ant)

==== Coleoptera (beetles) ====
- Harlequin ladybird (Harmonia axyridis)
- Dendroctonus micans (great spruce bark beetle)
- Diabrotica virgifera (Western corn rootworm)
- Lilioceris lilii (scarlet lily beetle)

=== Arachnids ===
- Argiope bruennichi (wasp spider)
- Euscorpius flavicaudis (European yellow-tailed scorpion)

=== Molluscs ===
- Arion vulgaris (Spanish slug)
- Brachidontes pharaonis (variable mussel) Mediterranean Islands
- Petricolaria pholadiformis (false angel wing)
- Pinctada radiata (Atlantic pearl-oyster)
- Potamopyrgus antipodarum (New Zealand mud snail)

=== Worms ===
- Arthurdendyus triangulatus (New Zealand flatworm)
- Australoplana sanguinea (Australian flatworm)
- Bothriocephalus acheilognathi (Asian tapeworm)

=== Other Animals ===
- Cordylophora caspia (euryhaline hydroid)

=== Plants ===
- European silver fir (established from forestry plantations)
- Grand fir (established from forestry plantations)
- Noble fir (established from forestry plantations)
- Western hemlock (established from forestry plantations)
- Douglas-fir (established from forestry plantations)
- Norway spruce (established from forestry plantations)
- Sitka spruce (established from forestry plantations)
- Scots pine (native in Scotland, and very locally in Ireland and northern England; reintroduced in southern England and Wales)
- European black pine (established from forestry plantations)
- Lawson's cypress (established escapes from garden planting)
- Western Redcedar (established from forestry plantations)
- American willow herb
- Autumnal crocus
- Bermuda buttercup
- Canadian pond weed
- Common field speedwell
- Evening primrose
- Floating pennywort
- Fox and cubs
- Giant hogweed
- Guernsey fleabane
- Himalayan balsam
- Hottentot fig
- Japanese knotweed
- Jewelweed
- Kudzu
- Least duckweed
- New Zealand willowherb
- Oxford ragwort
- Pigmy weed
- Purple dewplant
- Purple pitcher
- Rhododendron
- Water fern

== Continental Europe ==
=== Mammals ===
- Barbary macaque - Gibraltar (from North Africa)
- Honey badger - (from Africa, Middle East and India)
- African civet - (from Africa)
- South American coati - (from South America)
- Striped Skunk - (from North America)
- Javan mongoose - (from Asia)
- Indian grey mongoose - (from Asia)
- Common raccoon - (from North America)
- North African hedgehog - (from Africa)
- Raccoon dog - throughout Central and Eastern Europe into E Scandinavia (from Asia)
- European brown bear - reintroduced in parts of its former range in mainland Europe
- American mink - Spain, N. France, Belgium, The Netherlands, Scandinavia, Lithuania, Belarus, etc. (from North America)
- Egyptian mongoose - Portugal, southern Spain, island of Mljet (from North Africa)
- Small Asian mongoose - Croatia, Bosnia and Herzegovina, Serbia, Montenegro, Adriatic islands
- Common genet - from Africa to Europe
- Cat
- Deer:
  - Sika deer - France, Germany, Ireland, Denmark, Poland, Austria (from Asia)
  - Axis deer - Italy, Slovenia, Poland, Ukraine, Georgia, Russia east of Black Sea (from South Asia)
  - White-tailed deer - S Finland (from North America)
  - Chinese water deer - France (from China)
  - Wapiti - at least one example into Italy
- Barbary sheep - Spain (from Africa)
- Ovis orientalis (mouflon) - neolithic expansion of range through semi-domestication
- Goat
- Greenland muskox - Norway, Sweden (reintroduced, from Greenland)
- European bison - mainland Europe (reintroduced)
- European beaver - Finland (reintroduced)
- North American beaver - Finland, Russia
- Gray squirrel - Italy, Scotland, England, Ireland (from North America)
- Finlayson's squirrel
- Pallas's squirrel
- Siberian chipmunk - France, Germany, Austria, Netherlands, Finland, England (from further east in Eurasia)
- Muskrat - E Scandinavia, W France, north to Denmark, east to Ukraine, south to N Greece
- Brown rat - throughout (from Asia)
- Black rat - throughout (from South-East Asia or China, via India and Middle East)
- House mouse - throughout (from N Iran border)
- Coypu - (from South America)
- Cottontail rabbit - Spain, France, Italy (from North America)
- Lepus europaeus (brown hare) - Norway, Sweden
- Bennett's wallaby - from Australia

=== Birds ===
- Griffon vulture - (reintroduced in parts of its range in Europe)
- Bubo bubo (Eurasian eagle-owl) - reintroduced into Sweden
- Sacred ibis - France (from Africa)
- Phoenicopterus chilensis (Chilean flamingo)
- Black swan - Poland, Netherlands (from Australia)
- Canada goose - N Europe (France to Scandinavia) (from North America)
- Swan goose - (from Asia)
- Bar-headed goose - Netherlands
- Egyptian goose - UK, Netherlands (from Africa)
- Mandarin duck from Asia
- Ruddy duck - spreading from UK (from North America)
- Columba livia (rock dove) - into northern Europe
- Alectoris chukar (chukar partridge)
- Alectoris rufa (red-legged partridge) - into northern Europe
- Alectoris barbara (Barbary partridge)
- Perdix perdix (grey partridge) - reintroduced to many parts of Europe
- Common pheasant - throughout (from Asia; locally native in extreme SE Europe)
- Northern bobwhite - C France (from North America)
- Reeves's pheasant - France, Czech Republic (from China)
- Wild turkey - Germany (from North America)
- Rose-ringed parakeet - widespread (from northern India)
- Monk parakeet - Spain, Italy, Slovakia (from South America)
- Common myna - Russia (from India)
- Acridotheres cristatellus (crested myna)
- Leiothrix lutea (red-billed leiothrix)
- Ploceus cucullatus (village weaver)
- Ploceus melanocephalus (black-headed weaver)
- Euplectes afer (yellow-crowned bishop)
- Estrilda troglodytes (black-rumped waxbill)
- Euodice cantans (African silverbill)
- Common waxbill - Portugal (from Africa)
- Red avadavat - Spain, Po Delta (from India)
- Greater rhea - Germany (from South America)
- Corvus splendens (House crow)

=== Reptiles ===
- Pond slider - (from North America)
- American alligator - (from North America)
- Snouted Cobra - (from Africa)
- Mali Cobra - (from Africa)
- Anchieta's cobra - (from Africa)
- Boa constrictor - (from South America)
- Yellow anaconda - (from South America)
- Southern African rock python - (from Africa)
- Nile Monitor - (from Africa)
- Red tegu - (from South America)
- Black caiman - (from South America)
- Saltwater crocodile - (from Asia and Australia)
- Knight anole - (from Cuba)
- Chamaeleo chamaeleon (common chameleon)
- Chamaeleo africanus (African chameleon)
- California kingsnake - Spain
- Spur-thighed tortoise - Italy, Spain, Malta, Sardinia, Sicily, and Balaeric Islands (from Africa)
- Chinese softshell turtle - Spain (from China)

=== Amphibians ===
- Bullfrog - southern Europe (from North America)
- African clawed frog - (from Africa)
- Axolotl - in Germany
- Newt Paramesotriton labiatus - (from Asia)

=== Fish ===
- Alburnus alburnus (common bleak)
- Ameiurus melas (black bullhead) - (from North America)
- Ameiurus nebulosus (brown bullhead) - (from North America)
- Australoheros facetus (Chameleon cichlid)
- Carassius auratus (goldfish)
- Carassius gibelio (Prussian carp)
- Cyprinus carpio (common carp)
- Esox lucius (northern pike)
- Fundulus heteroclitus (mummichog)
- Gambusia holbrooki (eastern mosquitofish) - (from North America)
- Hypophthalmichthys molitrix (silver carp) - (from East Asia)
- Hypophthalmichthys nobilis (bighead carp) - (from East Asia)
- Lepomis gibbosus (pumpkinseed) - (from North America)
- Liza haematocheilus (haarder) - (from East Asia)
- Micropterus salmoides (Largemouth Bass)
- Neogobius fluviatilis (monkey goby)
- Neogobius melanostomus (round goby)
- Oncorhynchus mykiss (rainbow trout)
- Perccottus glenii (Chinese sleeper) - (from China)
- Pseudorasbora parva (stone moroko) - (from China)
- Rutilus rutilus (common roach)
- Sander lucioperca (Sander lucioperca)
- Tridentiger trigonocephalus (chameleon goby) - (from East Asia)

=== Crustaceans ===
- Balanus improvisus (Bay barnacle)
- Cercopagis pengoi (fishhook waterflea)
- Chelicorophium curvispinum (Caspian mud shrimp)
- Elminius modestus (Australasian barnacle)
- Hemigrapsus takanoi (brush-clawed shore crab)
- Hemimysis anomala (bloody-red mysid)
- Limnomysis benedeni (Donau-Schwebgarnele)
- Limnoria lignorum (gribble)
- Orconectes limosus.
- Palaemon elegans (rockpool shrimp)
- Paralithodes camtschaticus (Red king crab)
- Percnon gibbesi (Sally Lightfoot crab)
- Pontogammarus robustoides
- Procambarus clarkii (Louisiana crawfish)

=== Insects ===
- Adelges piceae (balsam woolly adelgid)
- Aedes albopictus (tiger mosquito)
- Aleurodicus dispersus (spiralling whitefly)
- Aphis spiraecola (green citrus aphid)
- Aromia bungii (red necked longicorn)
- Cacyreus marshalli (geranium bronze)
- Ceratitis capitata (Mediterranean fruit fly)
- Chilo suppressalis (striped rice stem borer)
- Cinara cupressi (Cypress aphid)
- Corythucha ciliata (sycamore lace bug)
- Cryptotermes brevis (West Indian drywood termite)
- Ctenarytaina eucalypti (blue gum psyllid)
- Cydalima perspectalis (box tree moth)
- Dendroctonus micans (great spruce bark beetle)
- Diabrotica virgifera (Western corn rootworm)
- Dreyfusia nordmannianae (silver fir adelges)
- Drosophila suzukii (spotted wing drosophila)
- Dryocosmus kuriphilus (chestnut gall wasp)
- Frankliniella occidentalis (western flower thrips)
- Harmonia axyridis (Asian lady beetle)
- Hypogeococcus pungens (cactus mealybug)
- Icerya purchasi (cottony cushion scale)
- Lasius neglectus (invasive garden ant)
- Leptinotarsa decemlineata (Colorado beetle)
- Linepithema humile (Argentine ant)
- Lysiphlebus testaceipes
- Opogona sacchari (banana moth)
- Monomorium pharaonis (Pharaoh ant)
- Paratrechina longicornis (longhorn crazy ant)
- Paysandisia archon (castniid palm borer)
- Pheidole megacephala (big-headed ant)
- Phoracantha semipunctata (Australian Eucalyptus longhorn)
- Rhagoletis cingulata (eastern cherry fruit fly)
- Thaumastocoris peregrinus (bronze bug)
- Vespa velutina (Asian predatory wasp) (in France)
- Xylosandrus germanus (black timber bark beetle)

=== Molluscs ===
- Arcuatula senhousia (Asian date mussel)
- Arion vulgaris (Spanish slug)
- Brachidontes pharaonis (variable mussel)
- Corbicula fluminalis
- Corbicula fluminea (Freshwater bivalve mollusk)
- Crassostrea gigas (Pacific oyster)
- Crepidula fornicata (Common slipper shell)
- Deroceras invadens (tramp slug)
- Dreissena polymorpha (Zebra mussel)
- Dreissena rostriformis bugensis (Quagga mussel)
- Ensis directus (American jack-knife clam)
- Petricolaria pholadiformis (false angel wing)
- Pinctada radiata (Atlantic pearl-oyster)
- Rapana venosa (Veined rapa whelk)
- Sinanodonta woodiana (Chinese pond mussel)

=== Other Animals ===
- Anguillicoloides crassus (swim bladder worm)
- Bothriocephalus acheilognathi (Asian tapeworm)
- Bugula neritina (brown bryozoan)
- Cordylophora caspia (euryhaline hydroid)
- Ficopomatus enigmaticus (Australian tubeworm)
- Globodera rostochiensis (yellow potato cyst nematode)
- Lumbricus terrestris (common earthworm)
- Marenzelleria neglecta (red gilled mud worm)
- Microcosmus squamiger
- Mnemiopsis leidyi (warty comb jelly)
- Polyandrocarpa zorritensis
- Rhopilema nomadica (nomad jellyfish)
- Schizoporella errata (branching bryozoan)
- Styela clava (Stalked sea squirt)
- Tricellaria inopinata

=== Plants ===
- Monterey pine (in warmer areas, from California; established from forestry plantations)
- Mediterranean cypress (in warmer areas; from SW Asia, also locally native [Crete, Cyprus]; long established from ornamental planting)
- Monterey cypress (in warmer areas, from California; established from forestry plantations)
- Smooth Arizona cypress (in warmer areas, from Arizona; established from forestry plantations)
- Persian walnut (from SW Asia, established from nut orchards)
- Northern red oak (from eastern North America; established from forestry plantations)
- Black cherry (from eastern North America; established from forestry plantations)
- Black locust (from eastern North America; established from forestry plantations)
- Silver wattle (in warmer areas, from Australia; established from ornamental planting)
- Tree-of-heaven (from eastern Asia; established from ornamental planting)
- Eucalyptus (multiple species in warmer areas, from Australia; established from forestry plantations)
- Prickly-pear (multiple species in Mediterranean areas, from southwestern North America; established from ornamental planting)
- Century-plant (in Mediterranean areas, from southwestern North America; established from ornamental planting)

== Hawaiian Islands ==
=== Mammals ===
- Wild pig
- Feral goat
- Chital deer
- Mule deer
- Cattle
- Sheep
- Ovis orientalis (mouflon)
- Feral cat
- Dog
- Small Asian mongoose
- Brown rat
- Black rat
- Pacific rat
- House mouse
- Brush-tailed rock-wallaby - small population on Oahu

=== Birds ===
Primary source for this list is Robert L. Pyle and Peter Pyle, The Birds of the Hawaiian Islands unless otherwise stated

- Barn owl
- Branta sandvicensis (nene) - reintroduced onto some islands
- Anas platyrhynchos (mallard) – vagrant but also introduced
- Anas wyvilliana (Hawaiian duck) - reintroduced onto some islands
- Black swan
- Mute swan
- Cattle egret
- Wild turkey
- California quail
- Gambel's quail
- Chukar
- Black francolin
- Grey francolin
- Erckel's francolin
- Japanese quail
- Red junglefowl
- Kalij pheasant
- Common pheasant
- Green pheasant - previous considered to be a subspecies of common pheasant
- Common peafowl
- Chestnut-bellied sandgrouse
- Feral pigeon
- Spotted dove
- Zebra dove
- Mourning dove
- Rose-ringed parakeet
- Mitred parakeet
- Red-masked parakeet
- Red-crowned amazon
- Mariana swiftlet
- Eurasian skylark
- Red-vented bulbul
- Red-whiskered bulbul
- Japanese bush warbler
- White-rumped shama
- Greater necklaced laughingthrush
- Chinese hwamei
- Red-billed leiothrix
- Japanese white-eye
- Northern mockingbird
- Common myna
- Yellow-faced grassquit
- Saffron finch
- Red-crested cardinal
- Yellow-billed cardinal
- Northern cardinal
- Western meadowlark
- House finch
- Telespiza cantans (Laysan finch) - artificially expanded range
- Yellow-fronted canary
- Atlantic canary
- House sparrow
- Red-cheeked cordon-bleu
- Lavender waxbill
- Orange-cheeked waxbill
- Black-rumped waxbill
- Common waxbill
- Red avadavat
- African silverbill
- Scaly-breasted munia
- Chestnut munia
- Java sparrow

=== Reptiles ===
- Anolis sagrei (brown anole)
- Anolis carolinensis (Carolina anole)
- Chamaeleo calyptratus (veiled chameleon)
- Gehyra mutilata (four-clawed gecko)
- Hemidactylus frenatus (common House Gecko)
- Hemidactylus garnotii (Indo-Pacific gecko)
- Hemiphyllodactylus typus (Indopacific tree gecko)
- Iguana iguana (green Iguana)
- Lampropholis delicata (delicate skink)
- Lepidodactylus lugubris (mourning gecko)
- Phelsuma grandis (Madagascar giant day gecko)
- Phelsuma guimbeaui (Mauritius lowland forest day gecko)
- Phelsuma laticauda (gold dust day gecko)
- Trioceros jacksonii (Jackson's chameleon)
- Palea steindachneri (wattle-necked softshell turtle)
- Pelodiscus sinensis (Chinese softshell turtle)
- Trachemys scripta (red-eared slider)

=== Amphibians ===
Primary source for this list is Nonindigenous Aquatic Species Database unless otherwise stated.

- Common coquí
- American bullfrog
- Cane toad
- Green and black poison dart frog
- Greenhouse frog
- Japanese wrinkled frog

=== Fish ===
Primary source for this list is Nonindigenous Aquatic Species Database unless otherwise stated.

- Amatitlania nigrofasciata (convict cichlid)
- Amphilophus citrinellus (Midas cichlid)
- Amphilophus labiatus (red devil cichlid)
- Astronotus ocellatus (oscar)
- Carassius auratus (goldfish)
- Cephalopholis argus (roi)
- Channa maculata (blotched snakehead)
- Cichla ocellaris (butterfly peacock bass)
- Cichlasoma spilurum (blue-eyed cichlid)
- Clarias fuscus (whitespotted clarias)
- Corydoras aeneus (bronze corydoras)
- Ctenopharyngodon idella (grass carp)
- Cyprinus carpio (common carp)
- Dorosoma petenense (threadfin shad)
- Fundulus grandis (Gulf killifish)
- Gambusia affinis (mosquitofish)
- Gambusia holbrooki (eastern mosquitofish)
- Hemichromis elongatus (banded jewelfish)
- Herklotsichthys quadrimaculatus (bluestripe herring)
- Hypophthalmichthys molitrix (silver carp)
- Ictalurus punctatus (channel catfish)
- Lepomis cyanellus (green sunfish)
- Lepomis macrochirus (bluegill)
- Limia vittata (Cuban limia)
- Lutjanus fulvus (blacktail snapper)
- Lutjanus kasmira (bluestripe snapper)
- Micropterus dolomieu (smallmouth bass)
- Micropterus salmoides (largemouth bass)
- Misgurnus anguillicaudatus (pond loach)
- Monopterus albus (Asian swamp eel)
- Morone saxatilis (striped bass)
- Mugilogobius cavifrons (mangrove goby)
- Omobranchus ferox (gossamer blenny)
- Oncorhynchus mykiss (rainbow trout)
- Oreochromis macrochir (longfin tilapia)
- Oreochromis mossambicus (Mozambique tilapia)
- Osteomugil engeli (kanda)
- Parablennius thysanius (tasseled blenny)
- Parachromis managuensis (jaguar cichlid)
- Pelvicachromis pulcher (krib)
- Poecilia latipinna (sailfin molly)
- Poecilia reticulata (guppy)
- Pseudotropheus johannii (bluegray mbuna)
- Pterygoplichthys multiradiatus (long-fin armored catfish)
- Rocio octofasciata (Jack Dempsey)
- Salmo trutta (sea trout)
- Salvelinus fontinalis (brook trout)
- Sardinella marquesensis (marquesan sardinella)
- Sarotherodon melanotheron (blackchin tilapia)
- Thorichthys meeki (firemouth cichlid)
- Tilapia zillii (redbelly tilapia)
- Upeneus vittatus (bandedtail goatfish)
- Xenentodon cancila (freshwater garfish)
- Xiphophorus hellerii (green swordtail)
- Xiphophorus maculatus (southern platyfish)

=== Arthropods ===
* Adoretus sinicus (Chinese rose beetle)

- Aedes albopictus (tiger mosquito)
- Aethina tumida (small hive beetle)
- Aleurotrachelus atratus (palm-infesting whitefly)
- Anoplolepis gracilipes (yellow crazy ant)
- Aphis spiraecola (Spirea aphid)
- Apis mellifera (Africanized bee)
- Argulus japonicus (Japanese fishlouse)
- Aulacaspis yasumatsui (cycad aulacaspis scale)
- Bactrocera cucurbitae (melon fly)
- Bactrocera dorsalis (oriental fruit fly)
- Bactrocera latifrons (solanaceous fruit fly)
- Blattella germanica (German cockroach)
- Cactoblastis cactorum (cactus moth)
- Callinectes sapidus (blue crab)
- Cerataphis lataniae (palm aphid)
- Ceratitis capitata (Mediterranean fruit fly)
- Chilo suppressalis (striped rice stem borer)
- Chthamalus proteus
- Coptotermes formosanus (Formosan subterranean termite)
- Cryptotermes brevis (powderpost termite)
- Culex quinquefasciatus (southern house mosquito)
- Darna pallivitta (nettle caterpillar)
- Drosophila suzukii (spotted wing drosophila)
- Elatobium abietinum (green spruce aphid)
- Epiphyas postvittana (light brown apple moth)
- Euwallacea fornicatus (tea shot-hole borer)
- Exomala orientalis (oriental beetle)
- Frankliniella occidentalis (western flower thrips)
- Glycaspis brimblecombei (red gum lerp psyllid)
- Homarus americanus (American lobster)
- Hypogeococcus pungens (cactus mealybug)
- Icerya purchasi (cottony cushion scale)
- Isometrus maculatus (lesser brown scorpion)
- Lernaea cyprinacea (anchor worm)
- Linepithema humile (Argentine ant)
- Litopenaeus vannamei (whiteleg shrimp)
- Maconellicoccus hirsutus (pink hibiscus mealybug)
- Macrobrachium lar (Tahitian prawn)
- Macrobrachium rosenbergii (giant river prawn)
- Monomorium pharaonis (pharaoh ant)
- Mythimna unipuncta (rice armyworm)
- Neocaridina davidi (cherry shrimp)
- Neolecanium cornuparvum (magnolia scale)
- Nesticella mogera (cave-dwelling spider)
- Opogona sacchari (banana moth)
- Oryctes rhinoceros (coconut rhinoceros beetle)
- Paratrechina longicornis (crazy ant)
- Pheidole megacephala (big-headed ant)
- Pineus pini (pine woolly aphid)
- Procambarus clarkii (red swamp crayfish)
- Pseudaulacaspis pentagona (mulberry scale)
- Pseudococcus viburni (obscure mealybug)
- Quadrastichus erythrinae (erythrina gall wasp)
- Schistocerca nitens (gray bird grasshopper)
- Sepedomerus macropus (liverfluke snail predator fly)
- Sepedon aenescens (snail-killing fly)
- Simosyrphus grandicornis (common hover fly)
- Solenopsis papuana (Papuan thief ant)
- Sophonia orientalis (two-spotted leafhopper)
- Tapinoma melanocephalum (ghost ant)
- Trichomyrmex destructor (Singapore ant)
- Varroa destructor (Varroa mite)
- Vespula pensylvanica (western yellowjacket)
- Wasmannia auropunctata (little fire ant)
- Xyleborinus saxesenii (fruit-tree pinhole borer)
- Xylocopa sonorina (Sonoran carpenter bee)
- Xylosandrus compactus (shot-hole borer)
- Xylosandrus crassiusculus (Asian ambrosia beetle)
- Xylosandrus germanus (black timber bark beetle)
- Xylosandrus morigerus (brown twig beetle)

=== Plants ===
- Canoe plants

=== Other species ===
- Corbicula fluminea - Asian clam
- Cornu aspersum (common garden snail)
- Euglandina rosea (rosy predator snail)
- Limax maximus (leopard slug)
- Magallana gigas (Pacific oyster)
- Mytilus galloprovincialis (Mediterranean mussel)
- Pomacea bridgesii - spike-topped apple snail
- Pomacea canaliculata - channeled applesnail
- Lophopodella carteri - freshwater bryozoan
- Plumatella repens - a bryozoan
- Carijoa riisei (snowflake coral)
- Phyllorhiza punctata (Australian spotted jellyfish)

== New Zealand ==
=== Mammals ===
- Common brushtail possum from Australia
- Cat from Europe
- Deer:
  - Red deer from Europe
  - Elk
  - Sika deer from Asia
  - Rusa deer from Asia
  - White-tailed deer from North America
  - Fallow deer
  - Sambar deer
- Donkeys: the Ponui donkey from Europe
- Cattle from Europe
- Goat from Europe
- Sheep
- European hare from Europe
- Horse from Europe
- European hedgehog from Europe
- Himalayan tahr from Himalaya
- Chamois from Europe
- Pig
- Rabbit from Europe
- Rats:
  - Brown and black rats from Europe
  - Pacific rat (kiore) from Pacific islands
- House mouse
- Least weasel from Europe
- Stoat from Europe
- Ferret from Europe
- Wallabies:
  - Parma wallaby - population on Kawau Island
  - Red-necked wallaby
  - Swamp wallaby - population on Kawau Island
  - Tammar wallaby

=== Birds ===
- Acanthis cabaret (lesser redpoll)
- Acridotheres tristis (common myna) from India
- Alauda arvensis (Eurasian skylark)
- Alectoris chukar (chuckor)
- Anas platyrhynchos (mallard)
- Anser anser (greylag goose)
- Athene noctua (little owl)
- Branta canadensis (Canada goose)
- Cacatua galerita (sulphur-crested cockatoo)
- Eolophus roseicapilla (galah)
- Callipepla californica (California quail)
- Carduelis carduelis (European goldfinch)
- Chloris chloris (European greenfinch)
- Colinus virginianus (bobwhite quail).
- Columba livia (rock dove)
- Corvus frugilegus (rook)
- Coturnix ypsilophora (brown quail)
- Cygnus olor (mute swan)
- Dacelo novaeguineae (laughing kookaburra)
- Emberiza cirlus (cirl bunting)
- Emberiza citrinella (yellowhammer)
- Fringilla coelebs (chaffinch)
- Gymnorhina tibicen (Australian magpie) from Australia
- Meleagris gallopavo (wild turkey)
- Passer domesticus (house sparrow) from UK
- Pavo cristatus (Indian peafowl)
- Phasianus colchicus (common pheasant) from Asia
- Platycercus elegans (crimson rosella)
- Platycercus eximius (eastern rosella)
- Prunella modularis (dunnock) from Europe
- Spilopelia chinensis (spotted dove)
- Sturnus vulgaris (common starling) from Europe
- Turdus merula (common blackbird) from Europe
- Turdus philomelos (song thrush) from Europe

=== Reptiles ===
- Lampropholis delicata (delicate skink)

=== Amphibians ===
- Green and golden bell frog
- Southern bell frog

=== Fish ===
- Brown trout
- Salmon
- Catfish
- Gambusia affinis (western mosquitofish)
- Scardinius erythrophthalmus (common rudd)

=== Insects ===
- Monarch butterfly from US
- Common housefly from Europe
- Honey bee from Europe
- Polistes chinensis (Asian paper wasp)
- Polistes humilis (common paper wasp)
- Vespula germanica (European wasp)
- Vespula vulgaris (common wasp)

=== Arachnids ===
- Varroa destructor (Varroa mite)
- Redback spider (from Australia)

=== Other Animals ===
- Didemnum vexillum (carpet sea squirt)

=== Plants ===
Up to 26,000 plants have been introduced into New Zealand. This list is a few of the more common and more invasive species.

- Gorse from Scotland
- Common broom – Cytisus scoparius
- Blackberry
- Lupin
- Ragwort
- Cotton thistle
- Creeping thistle – Cirsium arvense
- Mistflower – Ageratina riparia
- Kahili ginger – Hedychium gardnerianum
- Japanese honeysuckle
- Old man's beard - Clematis vitalba

== United States and Canada ==
=== Mammals ===
- Equus asinus (feral donkey) from Europe
- Equus caballus (feral horse) from Europe (known as mustangs)
- Feral camel from Egypt, Turkey and Tunisia
- Ammotragus lervia (Barbary sheep) from Africa
- Antilope cervicapra (blackbuck) in Texas
- Bison bison (American bison) in California
- Bos taurus (feral cattle) from Europe
- Boselaphus tragocamelus (nilgai) in Texas
- Capra aegagrus (feral goat, bezoar ibex) from Europe
- Hemitragus jemlahicus (Himalayan tahr) from Asia (in New Mexico)
- Ovis aries (feral sheep) from Europe
  - Ovis aries musimon
- Oryx gazella (gemsbok) in New Mexico
- Sus scrofa (wild boar) from Europe
- Phacochoerus (warthog) from Africa to Texas
- Deer
  - Axis axis (chital) from Asia
  - Cervus canadensis (American elk) in Florida
  - Alces alces (moose) in Newfoundland
  - Cervus elaphus (red deer) from Europe
  - Cervus nippon (sika deer) from Asia
  - Dama dama (fallow deer) From Europe
  - Rusa unicolor (sambar deer) from Asia
- Canis latrans (coyote) into Florida and Georgia through introduction and natural expansion
- Canis familiaris (feral dog) from Europe
- Felis silvestris (feral cat) from Europe
- Nasua narica (white-nosed coati) from South America (in Florida)
- Procyon lotor (raccoon) onto Prince Edward Island
- Lemur catta (ring-tailed lemur) from Madagascar (in St. Catherines Island, Georgia)
- Chlorocebus pygerythrus (vervet monkey) from Africa (in Florida)
- Macaca mulatta (rhesus macaque) from Asia (in Florida and South Carolina)
- Saimiri sciureus (common squirrel monkey) from South America (in Florida)
- Cricetomys gambianus (Gambian pouched rat) from Africa
- Hydrochoerus hydrochaeris (capybara) from South America (in Florida)
- Mus musculus (house mouse) from Europe
- Myocastor coypus (coypu) from South America
- Rattus norvegicus (brown rat) from Asia
- Rattus tanezumi (Asian house rat) from Asia
- Rattus rattus (black rat) from Europe
- Sciurus aberti (Abert's squirrel) into non-native areas of Arizona
- Sciurus aureogaster (Mexican red-bellied squirrel) from Mexico (in Florida)
- Sciurus niger (fox squirrel) into western US
- Spermophilus parryii (Arctic ground squirrel) to Unalaska Island, Kavalga Island, and Umnak Island in the Aleutian Archipelago from mainland Alaska
- Lepus europaeus (European hare) From Europe
- Oryctolagus cuniculus (European rabbit) from southwest Europe and northwest Africa
- Didelphis virginiana (Virginia opossum) from Eastern USA (in California)
- Dasypus novemcinctus (nine-banded armadillo) in Florida - there has been a natural extension of the armadillo's range into the US since 1870, reaching Florida by 1970, however the Florida population originates from established introductions dating to the 1920s.

=== Birds ===
- Pitangus sulphuratus (great kiskadee) - Bermuda
- Alauda arvensis (Eurasian skylark) in Vancouver area
- Red-whiskered bulbul from Asia (in California and Florida)
- Pycnonotus cafer (red-vented bulbul)
- Estrilda melpoda (orange-cheeked waxbill)
- Scaly-breasted munia from Asia
- Pin-tailed whydah from Africa
- House crow
- Carduelis carduelis (European goldfinch)
- Calocitta collie (black-throated magpie-jay) in California
- Chukar partridge from Asia
- Eurasian tree sparrow from Europe
- House finch (in the rest of mainland North America and Hawaii)
- Common starling from Europe
- Shiny cowbird from South America
- Common hill myna
- Common myna
- Grey partridge from Europe
- Himalayan snowcock from Asia, in Nevada
- House sparrow from Europe
- Spot-breasted oriole
- Budgerigar from Australia (in Florida)
- Rosy-faced lovebird from Africa
- Blue-crowned parakeet from South America (in California)
- Mitred parakeet from South America (in California)
- Nanday parakeet from South America
- Yellow-chevroned parakeet
- Red-masked parakeet
- Red-crowned amazon
- Lilac-crowned amazon in California
- Red-lored amazon in California
- Yellow-headed amazon
- Turquoise-fronted amazon
- Monk parakeet from South America
- Rose-ringed parakeet from Africa/Asia
- White-winged parakeet from South America
- Chestnut-fronted macaw from South America (in Florida)
- Blue-and-yellow macaw in Florida from South America
- Northern cardinal in California from elsewhere in North America
- Northern red bishop from Africa (in California)
- Muscovy duck from Central America and South America
- Anas platyrhynchos (mallard) - artificially expanded range
- Mandarin duck from Asia
- Bar-headed goose from Asia
- Branta canadensis (Canada goose) - reintroduced into many areas lost in North America
- Cygnus buccinator (trumpeter swan) - artificially expanded range
- Mute swan from Europe
- Ortalis vetula (plain chachalaca) - to Georgia from Texas
- Bonasa umbellus (ruffed grouse) - artificially expanded range
- Francolinus francolinus (black francolin)
- Common pheasant from Asia and Europe
- Common peafowl from Asia (in California)
- Chicken from Asia
- Oreortyx pictus (mountain quail) - artificially expanded range
- Wild turkey from Eastern USA (in California)
- Callipepla squamata (scaled quail) - artificially expanded range
- Callipepla californica (California quail) - artificially expanded range
- Callipepla gambelii (Gambel's quail) - artificially expanded range
- Colinus virginianus (northern bobwhite) - artificially expanded range
- Pelecanus occidentalis (brown pelican) - reintroduced into Louisiana
- Rock dove from Europe
- Spotted dove from Asia (in California)
- Barbary dove/African collared dove from Africa
- Eurasian collared dove from Europe
- Grey-headed swamphen
- Sacred ibis from Africa
- Gymnogyps californianus (California condor) - reintroduced to California and Arizona
- Falco peregrinus (peregrine falcon) - reintroduced into many areas lost in North America

=== Reptiles ===
- Spectacled caiman (in the Caribbean islands, Florida, and other states)
- Jackson's chameleon in Florida and California
- Brown anole in California, Georgia, Texas, Louisiana, Mississippi, and Alabama
- Green anole in California
- Hispaniolan green anole in Florida
- Puerto Rican crested anole in Florida
- Largehead anole in Florida
- Bark anole in Florida
- Knight anole in Florida
- Cuban green anole in Florida
- Jamaican giant anole in Florida
- Green iguana
- Brown basilisk in Florida
- Mexican spiny-tailed iguana
- Black spiny-tailed iguana in Florida
- Common agama
- Oriental garden lizard
- Common butterfly lizard in Florida
- Ashy gecko in Florida
- Ocellated gecko in Florida
- Common house gecko
- Indo-Pacific gecko
- Mediterranean house gecko in Florida and Kansas.
- Flat-tailed house gecko
- Ringed wall gecko
- Moorish wall gecko
- Tropical house gecko
- Tokay gecko
- Western green lizard in Kansas.
- Ameiva ameiva in Florida
- Cnemidophorus motaguae
- Eutropis multifasciata
- Italian wall lizard in Kansas.
- Common wall lizard (in northeast United States)
- Northern curlytail lizard in Florida
- Hispaniolan curlytail lizard in Florida
- Nile monitor (in California and Florida)
- Common snapping turtle (in nonnative parts of USA including California, Nevada, Oregon, Arizona, and other states)
- Spiny softshell turtle (in California)
- Chinese softshell turtle
- Twist-necked turtle
- Red-eared slider in California, from other parts of US
- Painted turtle - Phoenix, Arizona, and California
- Brahminy blind snake
- Elephant trunk snake
- Banded water snake into Texas and California introduced from the southern US
- Nerodia sipedon (northern watersnake) into California from native US
- Boa constrictor
- Burmese python (in the Everglades only)

=== Amphibians ===
Primary source for this list is Nonindigenous Aquatic Species Database unless otherwise stated.

- Pacific tree frog in Alaska
- Greenhouse frog
- Cuban tree frog
- Eastern tiger salamander into California, Nevada and Arizona from native areas of the US
- Common mudpuppy (in Maine and other Northeastern states)
- American bullfrog (in California, Arizona, Utah, non-native parts of Colorado and Nebraska, Oregon, Washington, Hawaii, and Nantucket island)
- Cane toad (in Florida only)
- Northern red-legged frog (in Alaska only)
- African clawed frog (in California and Arizona only)
- Eleutherodactylus coqui (common coquí)

=== Fish ===
Primary source for this list is Nonindigenous Aquatic Species Database unless otherwise stated.

- Acanthogobius flavimanus (Oriental goby) from Japan (in California and Florida)
- Alosa pseudoharengus (Alewife) (in Great Lakes)
- Amatitlania nigrofasciata (convict cichlid) from Central America
- Ameiurus nebulosus (brown bullhead) into western North America from eastern North America
- Amphilophus citrinellus (Midas cichlid) - Florida
- Astronotus ocellatus (oscar) from South America
- Belonesox belizanus (pike topminnow) - Florida
- Carassius auratus (goldfish) from Asia
- Channa argus (northern snakehead)
- Channa marulius (bullseye snakehead) - Florida
- Chitala ornata (clown featherback) - Florida
- Cichla ocellaris (butterfly peacock bass) from South America (in Florida)
- Cichlasoma bimaculatum (black acara) - Florida
- Clarias batrachus (walking catfish) from Asia (in Florida)
- Coptodon zillii (redbelly tilapia)
- Ctenopharyngodon idella (grass carp) from Asia
- Cyprinella lutrensis (red shiner) from Mississippi River basin into non-native areas
- Cyprinus carpio (common carp) from Europe
- Gambusia holbrooki (eastern mosquitofish) - from eastern US to non-native areas
- Gramma loreto (royal gramma) - Florida
- Gymnocephalus cernua (Eurasian ruffe) from Eurasia
- Hemichromis letourneuxi (African jewelfish) - Florida
- Zebrafish - from Asia
- Heros severus (banded cichlid) - Florida
- Heterotilapia buttikoferi (zebra tilapia) - Florida
- Hoplosternum littorale (tamuatá) - Florida
- Hypomesus nipponensis (wakasagi) - California
- Hypophthalmichthys molitrix (silver carp) from Asia
- Hypophthalmichthys nobilis (bighead carp) from China
- Hypostomus plecostomus (suckermouth catfish) - Texas: misidentification, it concerns Pterygoplichthys species
- Hypsoblennius invemar (tessellated blenny)
- Ictalurus furcatus (blue catfish) - from Mississippi River basin into non-native areas
- Ictalurus punctatus (channel catfish) - from central North America into non-native areas
- Ictiobus cyprinellus (bigmouth buffalo) - from the Eastern United States to California
- Leuciscus idus (ide)
- Lepomis cyanellus (green sunfish) - from central North America into non-native areas
- Macrognathus siamensis (peacock eel) - Florida
- Mayaheros urophthalmus (Mayan cichlid) from Asia (in Florida)
- Micropterus salmoides (largemouth bass) - from central North America into non-native areas
- Misgurnus anguillicaudatus (pond loach) from Asia
- Monopterus albus (Asian swamp eel) from Asia
- Morone americana (white perch) - from eastern US into non-native areas
- Morone chrysops (white bass) from Oklahoma (in California)
- Mylopharyngodon piceus (black carp) from Asia
- Neogobius melanostomus (round goby) from Eurasia
- Oreochromis aureus (blue tilapia) from Africa
- Oreochromis mossambicus (Mozambique tilapia)
- Oreochromis niloticus (Nile tilapia)
- Oreochromis urolepis (Wami tilapia) - California
- Parachromis managuensis (jaguar cichlid) - Florida
- Pelmatolapia mariae (spotted tilapia) - Florida
- Petromyzon marinus (sea lamprey) (introduced into the Great Lakes through the Welland Canal c. 1921)
- Poecilia mexicana (shortfin molly)
- Poecilia reticulata (guppy) from South America
- Poecilia sphenops (short-finned molly)- Montana and Nevada
- Proterorhinus semilunaris (Western tubenose goby) from Europe
- Pterois miles (common lionfish)
- Pterois volitans (red lionfish) (in Caribbean seas and shorelines on the east coast of the U.S.A only)
- Pterygoplichthys anisitsi (Paraná sailfin catfish) - Florida
- Pterygoplichthys disjunctivus (Vermiculated sailfin catfish) - Florida, North Carolina
- Pterygoplichthys multiradiatus (Orinoco sailfin catfish)- Florida
- Pterygoplichthys pardalis (leopard pleco) - North Carolina
- Rhinogobius brunneus (Amur goby) - Washington
- Rhodeus amarus (European bitterling) - New York
- Rivulus hartii (giant rivulus) - California
- Rocio octofasciata (Jack Dempsey) - South Dakota
- Sander lucioperca (zander) - North Dakota
- Sarotherodon melanotheron (blackchin tilapia) - Florida
- Scardinius erythrophthalmus (common rudd) from Europe
- Tinca tinca (tench) from Eurasia
- Trichromis salvini (Salvin's cichlid) - Florida
- Trichopsis vittata (croaking gourami) - Florida
- Tridentiger barbatus (Shokihaze goby) - California
- Tridentiger bifasciatus (Shimofuri goby) - California
- Tridentiger trigonocephalus (chameleon goby) - California
- Xiphophorus hellerii (green swordtail)
- Xiphophorus maculatus (southern platyfish)
- Xiphophorus variatus (variatus platy)

=== Crustaceans ===
Primary source for this list is Nonindigenous Aquatic Species Database unless otherwise stated.

- European green crab from Atlantic coasts of Europe and Northern Africa
- Chinese mitten crab from the coastal rivers and estuaries of the Yellow Sea
- Japanese shore crab from Japan
- Orconectes virilis (virile crayfish) native to North America, but now widespread outside its normal habitat
- Pacifastacus leniusculus (signal crayfish) into California from elsewhere in North America
- Procambarus clarkii (red swamp crawfish) now widespread in North America, from its native range in the Gulf of Mexico basin
- Spiny waterflea from northern Europe and western Russia
- Fishhook waterflea from the Ponto-Caspian region
- Daphnia lumholtzi
- Penaeus monodon
- Macrobrachium rosenbergii
- Hemimysis anomala
- Echinogammarus ischnus
- Bosmina coregoni
- Eubosmina maritima
- Argulus japonicus
- Megacyclops viridis
- Neoergasilus japonicus
- Canthocamptus hibernicus
- Nitokra incerta
- Schizopera borutzkyi
- Thermocyclops crassus
- Amphibalanus amphitrite
- Amphibalanus improvisus (bay barnacle)
- Limnoria quadripunctata (gribble)

=== Mollusks ===
Marine

- Arcuatula senhousia (Asian date mussel)
- Crepidula fornicata (American limpet, common slipper shell) into the coasts of British Columbia and Washington state from the Western Atlantic Ocean
- Littorina littorea (common periwinkle) from Europe
- Myosotella myosotis (mouse ear snail)
- Perna viridis (Asian green mussel) - Florida
- Potamocorbula amurensis (overbite clam)
- Rapana venosa (veined rapa whelk) from the Sea of Japan
- Venerupis philippinarum (Manila clam)

Freshwater

- Bellamya chinensis (Chinese mystery snail) from Asia
- Bithynia tentaculata (mud bithynia) from Europe
- Cipangopaludina japonica (Japanese mysterysnail)
- Corbicula fluminea (Asian clam) from Asia
- Dreissena bugensis (quagga mussel) from Caspian and Black Seas
- Dreissena polymorpha (zebra mussel) from the Caspian and Black Seas
- Marisa cornuarietis (Colombian ramshorn apple snail)
- Melanoides tuberculata (red-rimmed melania) from northern Africa to southern Asia
- Pisidium amnicum (greater European peaclam)
- Pisidium henslowanum (Henslow peaclam)
- Pisidium moitessierianum (pygmy peaclam)
- Pisidium supinum (humpbacked peaclam)
- Pomacea canaliculata (channeled applesnail)
- Pomacea haustrum (titan applesnail) - Florida
- Pomacea maculata (island applesnail)
- Potamopyrgus antipodarum (New Zealand mud snail) from New Zealand
- Radix auricularia (big-ear radix)
- Sphaerium corneum (European fingernailclam) from Europe
- Valvata piscinalis (European stream valvata) - Great Lakes

Terrestrial

- Cepaea hortensis (white-lipped snail) from Europe
- Cepaea nemoralis (grove snail) from Europe
- Cornu aspersum (garden snail) from Europe
- Deroceras invadens (tramp slug)
- Deroceras reticulatum (grey field slug)
- Limax maximus (leopard slug) from Europe
- Lissachatina fulica (giant African snail)
- Theba pisana (white garden snail) from Europe
- Zachrysia provisoria (Cuban brown snail)
- Xerolenta obvia (Heath Snail)

=== Worms ===
- Medicinal leech
- Ficopomatus enigmaticus - Australian tubeworm
- Dendrodrilus rubidus - trout worm
- Platydemus manokwari
- Anguillicoloides crassus (swim bladder worm)
- Bothriocephalus acheilognathi (Asian tapeworm)
- Globodera rostochiensis (golden nematode)
- Lumbricus rubellus (leaf worm)
- Lumbricus terrestris (common earthworm)

=== Insects ===
==== Beetles and relatives ====
- Mottled water hyacinth weevil from South America
- Rhinocyllus conicus (thistle-head weevil)
- Gonipterus platensis
- Gonipterus pulverulentus
- Diaprepes abbreviatus
- Asian long-horned beetle
- European chafer
- Brown spruce longhorn beetle from Europe
- Harlequin ladybug
- Emerald ash borer from Asia
- European elm bark beetle
- Elm leaf beetle
- Japanese beetle
- Paropsisterna m-fuscum
- Xyleborus glabratus
- Xyleborus dispar (pear blight beetle)
- Xyleborus similis
- Eucalyptus Longhorned Borer
- Aethina tumida (small hive beetle)
- Diabrotica virgifera (Western corn rootworm)
- Euwallacea fornicatus (Polyphagous and Kuroshio shot hole borers)
- Epitrix tuberis (tuber flea beetle)
- Lilioceris lilii (scarlet lily beetle)
- Metamasius callizona (bromeliad beetle)
- Scolytus schevyrewi (banded elm bark beetle)
- Xyleborinus saxesenii (fruit-tree pinhole borer)
- Xylosandrus compactus (black twig borer)
- Xylosandrus germanus (black timber bark beetle)

==== Crickets ====
- Southern mole cricket

==== Flies and allies ====
- Asian tiger mosquito
- Culex quinquefasciatus (southern house mosquito)
- European crane fly
- Birch leafminer
- Olive fruit fly
- Anastrepha ludens (Mexican fruit fly)
- Anastrepha suspensa (Greater Antilliean fruit fly)
- Drosophila suzukii
- Liriomyza huidobrensis
- Rhagoletis pomonella (apple maggot)

==== Termites ====
- Formosan subterranean termite
- Cryptotermes brevis (West Indian drywood termite)

==== Sawflies ====
- Larch sawfly
- European pine sawfly
- European spruce sawfly
- Diprion similis (introduced pine sawfly)

==== Aphids, whiteflies, and scale insects ====
- Hemlock woolly adelgid from Japan
- Balsam woolly adelgid
- Phorid fly from South America
- Ash whitefly
- Silverleaf whitefly
- Aleurocanthus woglumi (citrus blackfly)
- Singhiella simplex
- Aleurodicus dugesii
- Beech scale
- Saissetia oleae
- Aonidiella aurantii
- Coccus pseudomagnoliarum (citricola scale)
- Aulacaspis yasumatsui (cycad aulacaspis scale)
- Icerya purchasi (cottony cushion scale)
- Neolecanium cornuparvum (magnolia scale)
- Paratachardina pseudolobata (lobate lac scale)
- Diaphorina citri
- Glycaspis brimblecombei
- Ctenarytaina eucalypti (blue gum psyllid)
- Shivaphis celti
- Toxoptera citricida
- Aphis spiraecola (green citrus aphid)
- Cerataphis lataniae (palm aphid)
- Elatobium abietinum (green spruce aphid)
- Pineus pini (pine woolly aphid)
- Planococcus ficus
- Hypogeococcus pungens (cactus mealybug)
- Maconellicoccus hirsutus (pink hibiscus mealybug)
- Paracoccus marginatus (papaya mealybug)
- Phenacoccus solenopsis (cotton mealybug)
- Pseudococcus viburni (obscure mealybug)
- Homalodisca vitripennis (glassy-winged sharpshooter)

==== Ants ====
- Pharaoh ant from Africa
- Red imported fire ant from South America
- Black imported fire ant from Argentina
- Black-headed ant from Africa or Eurasia
- Hairy ant from Africa
- Argentine ant from Argentina
- Singapore ant from Singapore
- Floral ant from Asia
- European fire ant from Europe
- Caribbean crazy ant from Caribbean islands
- Asian needle ant from Asia
- Big-headed ant from Cameroon
- Technomyrmex albipes from Indonesia
- Electric ant from South America
- Plagiolepis alluaudi (the little yellow ant) from Madagascar

==== Bees ====
- Western honeybee from Europe
- Africanized bee from Africa and South America
- Green orchid bee from Central America to Florida

==== Wasps ====
- Vespula germanica
- Polistes dominula
- Sirex noctilio
- Selitrichodes globulus

==== Moths and butterflies ====
- Acrolepiopsis assectella (leek moth)
- Archips fuscocupreanus (exotic leafroller moth)
- Cactoblastis cactorum (cactus moth)
- Coleophora laricella (larch casebearer)
- Crocidosema plebejana (cotton tipworm)
- Duponchelia fovealis
- Epiphyas postvittana (light brown apple moth)
- Lymantria dispar (gypsy moth) from Europe
- Operophtera brumata (winter moth)
- Opogona sacchari (banana moth)
- Phyllocnistis citrella (citrus leafminer)
- Pieris rapae (cabbage white or small white) butterfly from Europe
- Rhyacionia buoliana (European pine shoot moth)
- Thymelicus lineola (European or Essex skipper) butterfly from Europe

==== Other insects ====
- Brown marmorated stink bug from Asia
- Bagrada hilaris
- Scantius aegyptius
- Thaumastocoris peregrinus
- Pseudacysta perseae
- Taeniothrips inconsequens
- Scirtothrips dorsalis
- Scirtothrips perseae
- Frankliniella occidentalis (western flower thrips)
- Thrips palmi (melon thrips)
- Forficula auricularia (common earwig)

=== Arachnids ===
- Lesser brown scorpion from Asia
- European false widow spider from Europe
- Latrodectus geometricus
- Varroa mite from Asia
- Oligonychus perseae
- Acarapis woodi (honey bee tracheal mite)
- Aculops fuchsiae (fuchsia gall mite)
- Raoiella indica (red palm mite)

=== Jellyfishes ===
- Craspedacusta sowerbii from China
- Blackfordia virginica
- Australian spotted jellyfish from Australia

=== Other animals ===
- Cordylophora caspia - freshwater hydroid
- Lophopodella carteri - freshwater bryozoan
- Stephanella hina - bryozoan
- Diadumene lineata - orange-striped green sea anemone
- Botrylloides violaceus - a colonial sea squirt
- Botryllus schlosseri - star ascidian
- Styela clava - stalked sea squirt

=== Plants ===
This is a non-exhaustive list of some of the more significant plant species

- Nymphaea odorata – American waterlily in California from native parts of North America
- Ailanthus altissima – tree-of-heaven from eastern Asia
- Falcataria moluccana -Batai wood
- Prunus cerasus – dwarf cherry from Eurasia
- Ficus benjamina – weeping fig from Asia
- Ficus benghalensis – banyan from Asia
- Ficus religiosa – sacred fig from Asia
- Acer platanoides – Norway maple from Europe
- Acer campestre – field maple from Europe
- Eurasian watermilfoil from Europe, Asia and northern Africa
- Ice plant from South Africa
- Eucalypts from Australia
- Celastrus orbiculatus – Oriental bittersweet
- Elaeagnus umbellata – autumn-olive
- Kali tragus – a tumbleweed from Eurasia
- Cynanchum louiseae (black swallow-wort)
- Reynoutria japonica (syn. Fallopia japonica) (Japanese Knotweed)
- Alliaria petiolata – garlic mustard
- Hesperis matronalis – dame's rocket from Eurasia
- Radish
- Rosa multiflora – multiflora rose
- Vicia cracca – cow vetch from Eurasia
- Vicia villosa – hairy vetch from Eurasia
- Pueraria montana – kudzu (a.k.a. Pueraria lobata) from Japan
- Cytisus scoparius – Common broom from Europe
- Robinia pseudoacacia - black locust (in non-native parts of the United States)
- Gleditsia triacanthos - Honey-locust (in non-native parts of the United States)
- Albizia julibrissin - Persian silk tree
- Acacia nilotica - Gum Arabic tree
- Acacia auriculiformis - Northern black wattle
- Acacia crassicarpa - Northern wattle
- Acacia saligna - Port Jackson wattle
- Acacia melanoxylon - Australian blackwood
- Samanea saman - Rain tree
- Lonicera japonica – Japanese honeysuckle
- Lonicera maackii – amur honeysuckle
- Lythrum salicaria – purple-loosestrife
- Ipomoea aquatica – water spinach from India and southeast Asia
- Conium maculatum – poison hemlock from Europe
- Daucus carota - wild carrot
- Hedera helix – common ivy from Europe
- Heptapleurum actinophyllum - Umbrella tree
- Taraxacum officinale – dandelion from Europe
- Centaurea diffusa – diffuse knapweed
- Bambusa vulgaris - common bamboo from China
- Phyllostachys aurea - Golden bamboo
- Phyllostachys aureosulcata - Yellow groove bamboo
- Allium sativum – garlic
- Allium neapolitanum - false garlic
- Hydrilla verticillata – hydrilla from India and Sri Lanka
- Trapa natans – water caltrop from Eurasia
- Eichhornia crassipes – water hyacinth from South America
- Pistia stratiotes – water lettuce from South America
- Arundo donax – giant reed from the Mediterranean
- Sorghum halepense – Johnson grass from Europe
- Salvinia molesta – giant salvinia from Brazil
- Codium fragile subsp. tomentosoides – green sea fingers
- Sargassum horneri

=== Oomycetes ===
- Phytophthora ramorum - the cause of sudden oak death

== Central America, Caribbean islands and Mexico ==
=== Mammals ===
- Donkey - introduced to Bonaire, successfully eradicated from Isla Saona
- Horse
- Fallow deer - Guiana Island and Barbuda
- Odocoileus virginianus (white-tailed deer) - onto several islands
- Northern giraffe (Giraffa camelopardalis) - Mexico
- Cattle - at least Hispaniola
- Goat
- Barbary sheep - Mexico
- Nilgai - Mexico by natural colonisation from the introduced Texan population
- Pig
- Monkeys:
  - Mona monkey from Africa (in Grenada)
  - Green monkey (previously identified as the vervet monkey) (From Africa, In Barbados
  - Stump-tailed macaque - small population on the islands in Laguna Catemaco
  - Rhesus macaque - there were established populations in Puerto Rico up until 2010. There has since been an unpublicised eradication program by the Puerto Rican government, which may have been successful, which would limit the population to research establishments.
  - Patas monkey from Africa (in Puerto Rico)
- Small Asian mongoose from Asia (in Caribbean islands)
- Dog
- Cat
- European rabbit - population on Clarion Island and Hispaniola
- Eastern cottontail - on Cuba
- European hare - on Barbados
- Lowland paca - on Cuba
- Mexican Agouti-on Cuba
- Red-rumped agouti - on Dominica, Grenada, and Virgin Islands
- Brown rat
- Black rat
- House mouse
- Procyon lotor (raccoon) onto Bahamas, Guadeloupe, and Martinique, Isla Saona and extirpated from Barbados

=== Birds ===
- Cathartes aura (turkey vulture) Puerto Rico
- Chicken
- Numida meleagris (helmeted guineafowl)
- Alectoris chukar (chukar partridge)
- Colinus virginianus (northern bobwhite) artificially expanded range
- Colinus cristatus (crested bobwhite) artificially expanded range
- Alectoris barbara (Barbary partridge)
- Eurasian collared dove
- Feral pigeon
- European starling
- Pin-tailed whydah into Puerto Rico
- Javan myna into Puerto Rico
- Common hill myna into Puerto Rico
- Java sparrow
- Common waxbill
- Village weaver
- Passer domesticus (house sparrow)
- Euplectes afer (yellow-crowned bishop)
- Estrilda melpoda (orange-cheeked waxbill)
- Lonchura cucullata (bronze mannikin)
- Lonchura punctulata (scaly-breasted munia)
- Sicalis flaveola (saffron finch)
- Sicalis luteola (grassland yellow finch) Lesser Antilles
- Tiaris canorus (Cuban grassquit) Bahamas
- Icterus icterus (Venezuelan troupial)
- Quiscalus lugubris (Carib grackle)
- Molothrus bonariensis (shiny cowbird)
- Cockatiel
- Sulphur-crested cockatoo
- Scarlet macaw into Puerto Rico from native parts of the Americas
- Red-and-green macaw into Puerto Rico from native parts of the Americas
- Blue-and-yellow macaw into Puerto Rico from native parts of the Americas
- Orange-winged amazon
- Budgerigar
- Monk parakeet
- White-winged parakeet into Puerto Rico
- Nanday parakeet into Puerto Rico
- Green-rumped parrotlet
- Eupsittula pertinax (brown-throated parakeet) Saint Thomas, U.S. Virgin Islands
- Amazona ventralis (Hispaniolan amazon) Puerto Rico and US Virgin Is.

=== Reptiles ===
- Spectacled caiman - Cuba and Puerto Rico
- Burmese python - Puerto Rico
- Boa constrictor - Puerto Rico
- Green Anaconda - Trinidad and Tobago
- Anolis sagrei (brown anole)
- Anolis wattsi (Watts' anole)
- Trachemys scripta elegans (red-eared slider)

=== Amphibians ===
- Common coquí - U.S. Virgin Islands, Dominican Republic
- Greenhouse frog - Jamaica, Bahamas
- Cuban tree frog
- Scinax ruber - Puerto Rico, Lesser Antilles
- Cane toad
- American bullfrog

=== Fish ===
- Mozambique tilapia
- Gambusia holbrooki (eastern mosquitofish)
- Micropterus salmoides (largemouth bass)
- Xiphophorus hellerii (green swordtail)

=== Insects ===
- Leaf-cutting ant into Guadeloupe from South America
- Cactoblastis cactorum
- Aethina tumida (small hive beetle)
- Aleurocanthus woglumi (citrus blackfly)
- Aphis spiraecola (green citrus aphid)
- Aulacaspis yasumatsui (cycad aulacaspis scale)
- Cerataphis lataniae (palm aphid)
- Ceratitis capitata (Mediterranean fruit fly)
- Cryptotermes brevis (West Indian drywood termite)
- Culex quinquefasciatus (southern house mosquito)
- Frankliniella occidentalis (western flower thrips)
- Hypogeococcus pungens (cactus mealybug)
- Icerya purchasi (cottony cushion scale)
- Maconellicoccus hirsutus (pink hibiscus mealybug)
- Papilio demoleus (common lime butterfly)
- Paracoccus marginatus (papaya mealybug)
- Paratachardina pseudolobata (lobate lac scale)
- Pheidole megacephala (big-headed ant)
- Phenacoccus solenopsis (cotton mealybug)
- Phyllocnistis citrella (citrus leafminer)
- Sternochetus mangiferae (mango seed weevil)
- Tapinoma melanocephalum (ghost ant)
- Thrips palmi (melon thrips)
- Toxoptera citricida (brown citrus aphid)
- Trichomyrmex destructor (destructive trailing ant)
- Wasmannia auropunctata (electric ant)
- Xyleborinus saxesenii (fruit-tree pinhole borer)
- Xylosandrus compactus (black twig borer)
- Xylosandrus crassiusculus (Asian ambrosia beetle)
- Xylosandrus morigerus (brown twig beetle)

=== Arachnids ===
- Raoiella indica (red palm mite)
- Rhipicephalus microplus (Asian blue tick)

=== Worms ===
- Bothriocephalus acheilognathi (Asian tapeworm)
- Platydemus manokwari (New Guinea flatworm)

=== Crustaceans ===
- Amphibalanus improvisus (bay barnacle)

=== Mollusks ===
- Deroceras invadens (tramp slug)
- Deroceras laeve (marsh slug)
- Euglandina rosea (rosy wolfsnail)
- Lissachatina fulica (giant African snail)
- Marisa cornuarietis (Colombian ramshorn apple snail)
- Melanoides tuberculata (red-rimmed melania)
- Pomacea canaliculata (channeled applesnail)
- Zachrysia provisoria (Cuban brown snail)

== South America ==
=== Mammals ===
- Beaver from North America to Tierra del Fuego
- Muskrat
- Brown rat
- Black rat
- House mouse
- European hare from Europe to Peru, Bolivia, Paraguay, Argentina, Chile, Uruguay and Brazil
- European rabbit
- Small Asian mongoose from Asia to Venezuela, Guyana and Suriname
- American mink
- Dog
- Cat
- Chital from Asia to Argentina, Brazil, Uruguay and Chile
- Elk from North America
- Red deer from Europe
- Blackbuck from Asia to Argentina and Uruguay
- Himalayan tahr from New Zealand (originally from Asia)
- Fallow deer
- Water buffalo - at least Brazil
- Cattle
- Wild boar from Europe
- Goat
- Feral horse from Europe
- Hippopotamus from Africa to Colombia, Originally kept by Pablo Escobar

=== Birds ===
- Anas platyrhynchos (mallard)
- Anser anser (greylag goose)
- Brotogeris versicolurus (white-winged parakeet) – Peru
- Callipepla californica (California quail)
- Carduelis carduelis (European goldfinch)
- Chloris chloris (European greenfinch)
- Columba livia (rock dove)
- Estrilda astrild (common waxbill)
- Passer domesticus (house sparrow)
- Ploceus cucullatus (village weaver)
- Rhea pennata (Darwin's rhea) - introduced to Tierra del Fuego from mainland
- Shiny cowbird (shiny cowbird) – Chile
- Thraupis episcopus (blue-gray tanager) - Lima

=== Amphibians ===
- American bullfrog

=== Fish ===
- Arapaima gigas from the Amazon rivers
- Cherry barb from Sri Lanka
- Mozambique tilapia
- Pterois volitans (Red lionfish)
- Salmo trutta (Brown trout)
- Oncorhynchus mykiss (Rainbow trout)
- Oreochromis niloticus (Nile tilapia)
- Cyprinus carpio (Common carp)
- Micropterus salmoides (Largemouth bass)
- Trichogaster pectoralis (Snakeskin gourami)

=== Insects ===
- Aedes albopictus (tiger mosquito)
- Anastrepha fraterculus (South American fruit fly)
- Aphis spiraecola (green citrus aphid)
- Bemisia tabaci (silverleaf whitefly)
- Cerataphis lataniae (palm aphid)
- Ceratitis capitata (Mediterranean fruit fly)
- Cinara cupressi (cypress aphid)
- Cryptotermes brevis (West Indian drywood termite)
- Ctenarytaina eucalypti (blue gum psyllid)
- Icerya purchasi (cottony cushion scale)
- Linepithema humile (Argentine ant)
- Maconellicoccus hirsutus (hibiscus mealybug)
- Nylanderia fulva (Crazy ant)
- Phenacoccus solenopsis (cotton mealybug)

=== Arachnids ===
- Raoiella indica (red palm mite)

=== Crustaceans ===
- Carcinus maenas (shore crab)
- Charybdis hellerii (Blue Jaiba crab)
- Cherax cainii
- Cherax quadricarinatus (Australian red claw crayfish)
- Daphnia lumholtzi
- Macrobrachium rosenbergii (giant river prawn)
- Penaeus monodon (Asian tiger shrimp)
- Procambarus clarkii (red swamp crawfish)

=== Mollusks ===
- Achatina fulica (Giant African snail)
- Deroceras invadens (tramp slug)
- Deroceras laeve (marsh slug)
- Cornu aspersum (Garden snail)
- Melanoides tuberculata (red-rimmed melania)

== Asia excluding Japan ==
=== Mammals ===
- Macaca fascicularis (crab-eating macaque) into Hong Kong
- Canis familiaris (dog)
- Felis catus (cat) from Africa
- Neogale vison (American mink) from North America
- Procyon lotor (common raccoon) from North America
- Myocastor coypus (nutria) from South America
- Ondatra zibethicus (muskrat) from North America
- Oryctolagus cuniculus (European rabbit) from Europe
- Rattus norvegicus (brown rat) onto islands from mainland Asia
- Rattus rattus (black rat)
- Ceratotherium simum (southern white rhinoceros) from Africa to China
- Equus africanus (donkey) - Sri Lanka
- Giraffa camelopardalis reticulata (reticulated giraffe) - Arabia (see Sir Bani Yas)
- Ovibos moschatus (muskox) - Russia
- Ovis aries (sheep) into Tibet

=== Birds ===
- Acridotheres cinereus (pale-bellied myna) into Borneo
- Acridotheres cristatellus (crested myna) artificially expanded range
- Acridotheres tristis (common myna) into non-native areas
- Amandava amandava (red avadavat) artificially expanded range
- Cacatua galerita (sulphur-crested cockatoo) artificially expanded range into eastern Indonesia
- Cacatua sulphurea (yellow-crested cockatoo) Hong Kong
- Corvus splendens (house crow) into non-native areas
- Eclectus roratus (eclectus parrot) artificially expanded range into eastern Indonesia
- Euodice cantans (African silverbill)
- Francolinus pintadeanus (Chinese francolin) Philippines from mainland
- Garrulax canorus (Chinese hwamei) into non-native areas
- Geopelia striata (zebra dove) artificially expanded range
- Geronticus eremita (northern bald ibis) reintroduced into Turkey
- Lonchura atricapilla (chestnut munia) Maluku Islands
- Lonchura leucogastroides (Javan munia) Singapore and S Malay Peninsula
- Padda oryzivora (Java sparrow) artificially expanded range
- Passer montanus (Eurasian tree sparrow) artificially expanded range
- Perdix dauurica (Daurian partridge) Philippines from mainland
- Psittacula krameri (rose-ringed parakeet) into Israel
- Spilopelia chinensis (spotted dove) eastern Indonesia
- Tanygnathus lucionensis (blue-naped parrot) Borneo
- Trichoglossus haematodus (coconut lorikeet) Hong Kong

=== Reptiles ===
- Common snapping turtle
- Pond slider
- Brown anole into Taiwan
- Brahminy blind snake into non-native areas
- Burmese python into Singapore

=== Amphibians ===
- Cane toad
- American bullfrog

=== Fish ===
- Arapaima gigas from South America
- Abbottina rivularis (Chinese false gudgeon) into non-native areas
- Amatitlania nigrofasciata (convict cichlid)
- Atractosteus spatula (alligator gar)
- Clarias gariepinus (African sharptooth catfish)
- Colossoma macropomum (tambaqui) from South America
- Coptodon zillii (redbelly tilapia)
- Gambusia affinis (mosquitofish)
- Gambusia holbrooki (eastern mosquitofish)
- Hemibarbus maculatus (spotted steed) into non-native areas
- Hemiculter leucisculus (sharpbelly) into Central Asia
- Ictalurus punctatus (channel catfish)
- Lepomis macrochirus (bluegill)
- Mayaheros urophthalmus (Mayan cichlid)
- Micropterus dolomieu (smallmouth bass)
- Micropterus salmoides (largemouth bass)
- Oreochromis mossambicus (Mozambique tilapia)
- Oreochromis niloticus (Nile tilapia)
- Poecilia reticulata (guppy)
- Poecilia sphenops (molly)
- Pseudorasbora parva (stone moroko) into non-native areas
- Pterygoplichthys disjunctivus (suckermouth armored catfish)
- Rhodeus ocellatus (rosy bitterling) into non-native areas
- Salvelinus fontinalis (brook trout)
- Xiphophorus hellerii (green swordtail)

=== Insects ===
- Aleurodicus dispersus (spiralling whitefly)
- Belostoma bifoveolatum (giant water bug) from South America
- Bemisia tabaci (silverleaf whitefly)
- Blattella germanica (German cockroach)
- Cameraria ohridella (horse-chestnut leaf miner)
- Ceratitis capitata (Mediterranean fruit fly)
- Chrysomya bezziana (Old World screwworm fly)
- Cinara cupressi (cypress aphid)
- Corythucha ciliata (sycamore lace bug)
- Ctenarytaina eucalypti (blue gum psyllid)
- Cydalima perspectalis (box tree moth)
- Dendroctonus micans (great spruce bark beetle)
- Dendroctonus pseudotsugae (Douglas-fir beetle)
- Frankliniella occidentalis (western flower thrips)
- Hypera postica (alfalfa weevil)
- Hyphantria cunea (fall webworm)
- Icerya purchasi (cottony cushion scale)
- Linepithema humile (Argentine ant)
- Liriomyza sativae (vegetable leaf miner)
- Lissorhoptrus oryzophilus (rice water weevil)
- Monomorium pharaonis (pharaoh ant)
- Oracella acuta (loblolly pine mealybug)
- Pheidole megacephala (big-headed ant)
- Phenacoccus manihoti (cassava mealybug)
- Phenacoccus solenopsis (cotton mealybug)
- Pineus pini (pine woolly aphid)
- Quadrastichus erythrinae (Erythrina gall wasp)
- Solenopsis geminata (fire ant)
- Solenopsis invicta (red imported fire ant)
- Spodoptera frugiperda (fall armyworm)
- Trialeurodes vaporariorum (greenhouse whitefly)
- Trichomyrmex destructor (destructive trailing ant)
- Vespa velutina (Asian predatory wasp)
- Wasmannia auropunctata (electric ant)
- Xyleborus volvulus

=== Other arthropods ===
- Latrodectus geometricus (brown widow)
- Procambarus clarkii (red swamp crawfish)
- Amphibalanus amphitrite (striped barnacle)
- Amphibalanus improvisus (bay barnacle)

=== Molluscs ===
- Ambigolimax valentianus (threeband gardenslug)
- Brachidontes pharaonis (variable mussel) into Mediterranean Sea
- Cornu aspersum (garden snail)
- Euglandina rosea (rosy wolfsnail)
- Limnoperna fortunei (golden mussel) into non-native areas
- Lissachatina fulica (giant African snail)
- Mytilopsis sallei (black-striped mussel)
- Mytilus galloprovincialis (Mediterranean mussel)
- Pinctada radiata (Atlantic pearl-oyster) into Mediterranean Sea
- Pomacea canaliculata (channeled applesnail)
- Potamopyrgus antipodarum (New Zealand mud snail)
- Rapana venosa (veined rapa whelk) into Mediterranean Sea
- Rumina decollata (decollate snail)
- Venerupis philippinarum (Manila clam) into Mediterranean Sea

=== Other Animals ===
- Molgula manhattensis (sea grapes)
- Bursaphelenchus xylophilus (pine wood nematode)
- Globodera rostochiensis (golden nematode)
- Platydemus manokwari (New Guinea flatworm)
- Ficopomatus enigmaticus (Australian tubeworm)
- Hydroides elegans
- Bugula neritina (brown bryozoan)

== Japan ==
=== Mammals ===
- Macaca cyclopis (Formosan rock macaque) in Japan (from mainland Asia)
- Macaca mulatta (rhesus macaque) in Japan (from mainland Asia)
- Canis familiaris (dog)
- Felis catus (cat) from Africa
- Neogale vison (American mink) from North America
- Martes melampus (Japanese marten)
- Mustela itatsi (Japanese weasel)
- Mustela sibirica (Siberian weasel)
- Nyctereutes procyonoides (common raccoon dog)
- Procyon lotor (common raccoon) from North America
- Urva auropunctata (small Asian mongoose) in Japan (from mainland Asia)
- Paguma larvata (masked palm civet) in Japan (from Taiwan)
- Erinaceus amurensis (Amur hedgehog) to Japan from mainland Asia
- Pipistrellus abramus (Japanese house bat) from native parts of Japan to Hokkaido
- Crocidura dsinezumi (Dsinezumi shrew)
- Eutamias sibiricus (Siberian chipmunk)
- Mus musculus (house mouse)
- Rattus exulans (Polynesian rat)
- Rattus norvegicus (brown rat)
- Rattus rattus (black rat)
- Sciurus vulgaris (red squirrel)
- Callosciurus erythraeus (Pallas's squirrel) into Japan
- Callosciurus finlaysonii (Finlayson's squirrel) into Japan
- Myocastor coypus (nutria) from South America
- Ondatra zibethicus (muskrat) from North America
- Oryctolagus cuniculus (European rabbit) from Europe (see also Ōkunoshima, also known as Japanese rabbit island)
- Bos taurus (cattle)
- Capra aegagrus (feral goat)
- Muntiacus reevesi (Reeves's muntjac)
- Sus scrofa (wild boar)

=== Birds ===
- Acridotheres cristatellus (crested myna)
- Acridotheres tristis (common myna)
- Amandava amandava (red avadavat)
- Bambusicola thoracicus (Chinese bamboo partridge) Japan from China
- Branta canadensis (Canada goose)
- Colinus virginianus (northern bobwhite)
- Columba livia (rock dove) into Japan
- Cygnus atratus (black swan)
- Cygnus olor (mute swan) into Japan from mainland Asia
- Garrulax canorus (Chinese hwamei)
- Garrulax cineraceus (moustached laughing thrush)
- Garrulax sannio (white-browed laughing thrush)
- Gracupica contra (Asian pied starling) in Japan from mainland Asia
- Himantopus mexicanus (black-necked stilt) into Japan. Possible subspecies of the native Himantopus himantopus
- Leiothrix lutea (red-billed leiothrix) into Japan
- Padda oryzivora (Java sparrow)
- Lonchura atricapilla (chestnut munia)
- Lonchura malacca (tricolored munia)
- Lonchura striata (white-rumped munia)
- Melopsittacus undulatus (budgerigar)
- Paroaria coronata (red-crested cardinal)
- Pavo cristatus (Indian peafowl) in Japan
- Phasianus colchicus (common pheasant) into Japan
- Pica pica (Eurasian magpie) Japan from mainland
- Psittacula alexandri (red-breasted parakeet) in Japan
- Psittacula eupatria (Alexandrine parakeet) in Japan
- Psittacula krameri (ring-necked parakeet)
- Pycnonotus jocosus (red-whiskered bulbul) in Japan
- Pycnonotus sinensis (light-vented bulbul)
- Vidua macroura (pin-tailed whydah)

=== Reptiles ===
- Chinese box turtle in Japan
- Chinese pond turtle in Japan
- Common snapping turtle
- Pond slider
- Yellow pond turtle into Japan from Taiwan
- Pelodiscus sinensis (Chinese softshell turtle)
- Carolina anole
- Gekko hokouensis (Hokou gecko)
- Hemidactylus frenatus (common house gecko)
- Hemiphyllodactylus typus (Indopacific tree gecko)
- Japalura swinhonis (Swinhoe's tree lizard)
- Lepidodactylus lugubris (mourning gecko)
- Brahminy blind snake
- Orthriophis taeniurus (beauty rat snake)
- Protobothrops elegans (elegant pitviper)
- Protobothrops mucrosquamatus (brown spotted pit viper)

=== Amphibians ===
- Cane toad
- American bullfrog
- Common tree frog into Japan from Philippines
- African clawed frog
- Chinese giant salamander into Japan from China

=== Fish ===
- Acheilognathus cyanostigma (striped bitterling)
- Acheilognathus macropterus
- Acheilognathus rhombeus (kanehira)
- Acheilognathus typus (zenitanago)
- Amatitlania nigrofasciata (convict cichlid)
- Channa argus (northern snakehead) into Japan
- Channa asiatica (small snakehead)
- Clarias batrachus (walking catfish) into at least Okinawa Island from mainland Asia
- Clarias fuscus (whitespotted clarias)
- Channa maculata (blotched snakehead)
- Coptodon zillii (redbelly tilapia)
- Ctenopharyngodon idella (grass carp)
- Cyprinus carpio (common carp)
- Danio albolineatus (pearl danio)
- Danio rerio (zebrafish)
- Gambusia affinis (mosquitofish)
- Gambusia holbrooki (eastern mosquitofish)
- Hypophthalmichthys molitrix (silver bighead)
- Hypophthalmichthys nobilis (striped bighead)
- Ictalurus punctatus (channel catfish)
- Lepomis macrochirus (bluegill)
- Macropodus ocellatus (paradise fish)
- Micropterus dolomieu (smallmouth bass)
- Micropterus salmoides (largemouth bass)
- Monopterus albus (Asian swamp eel)
- Mylopharyngodon piceus (black carp)
- Odontesthes bonariensis (Argentinian silverside)
- Oncorhynchus mykiss (rainbow trout)
- Oreochromis mossambicus (Mozambique tilapia)
- Oreochromis niloticus (Nile tilapia)
- Otopharynx lithobates
- Parambassis ranga (Indian glassy fish)
- Paramisgurnus dabryanus (kara-dojou)
- Poecilia reticulata (guppy)
- Poecilia sphenops (molly)
- Pterygoplichthys disjunctivus (suckermouth armored catfish)
- Rhodeus ocellatus (rosy bitterling)
- Salmo trutta (brown trout)
- Salvelinus fontinalis (brook trout)
- Salvelinus namaycush (lake trout)
- Silurus asotus (Amur catfish)
- Tridentiger brevispinis (numachichibu)
- Xiphophorus hellerii (green swordtail)

=== Insects ===
- Agriosphodrus dohrni
- Anoplolepis gracilipes (yellow crazy ant)
- Aromia bungii (red-necked longhorn)
- Bemisia tabaci (silverleaf whitefly)
- Blattella germanica (German cockroach)
- Bombus terrestris (buff-tailed bumblebee)
- Cavelerius saccharivorus (oriental chinch bug)
- Coptotermes formosanus (Formosan subterranean termite)
- Corythucha ciliata (sycamore lace bug)
- Cylas formicarius (sweet potato weevil)
- Delta pyriforme
- Drosophila suzukii (spotted wing drosophila)
- Dryocosmus kuriphilus (chestnut gall wasp)
- Epilachna varivestis (Mexican bean beetle)
- Erionota torus (rounded palm-redeye)
- Euscepes postfasciatus (West Indian sweetpotato weevil)
- Frankliniella occidentalis (western flower thrips)
- Hestina assimilis (red ring skirt)
- Hylurgus ligniperda (red-haired pine bark beetle)
- Hypera postica (alfalfa weevil)
- Hyphantria cunea (fall webworm)
- Icerya purchasi (cottony cushion scale)
- Linepithema humile (Argentine ant)
- Liriomyza sativae (vegetable leaf miner)
- Liriomyza trifolii (serpentine leafminer)
- Lissorhoptrus oryzophilus (rice water weevil)
- Monomorium pharaonis (pharaoh ant)
- Nealsomyia rufella
- Opisthoplatia orientalis
- Paraglenea fortunei
- Parasa lepida (nettle caterpillar)
- Pheidole megacephala (big-headed ant)
- Phenacoccus solenopsis (cotton mealybug)
- Protaetia orientalis
- Quadrastichus erythrinae (Erythrina gall wasp)
- Rhabdoscelus obscurus (sugarcane weevil borer)
- Rhynchophorus ferrugineus (red palm weevil)
- Sericinus montela (sericin swallow-tail butterfly)
- Solenopsis geminata (fire ant)
- Thrips palmi (melon thrips)
- Trialeurodes vaporariorum (greenhouse whitefly)
- Unaspis yanonensis (arrowhead snow scale)
- Vespa velutina (Asian predatory wasp)
- Xyleborus volvulus
- Xylocopa tranquebarorum (Taiwanese bamboo carpenter bee)

=== Other Arthropods ===
- Aculops lycopersici (tomato russet mite)
- Latrodectus geometricus (brown widow)
- Latrodectus hasseltii (redback spider)
- Chamberlinius hualinensis
- Carcinus aestuarii (Mediterranean green crab)
- Pacifastacus leniusculus (signal crayfish)
- Procambarus clarkii (red swamp crawfish)
- Pyromaia tuberculata (tuberculate pear crab)
- Amphibalanus amphitrite (striped barnacle)
- Amphibalanus improvisus (bay barnacle)
- Megabalanus coccopoma (titan acorn barnacle)
- Crangonyx floridanus (Florida crangonyctid)

=== Molluscs ===
- Ambigolimax valentianus (threeband gardenslug)
- Corbicula fluminea (Asian clam)
- Crepidula fornicata (common slipper shell)
- Crepidula onyx (onyx slippersnail)
- Euglandina rosea (rosy wolfsnail)
- Limnoperna fortunei (golden mussel)
- Lissachatina fulica (giant African snail)
- Mytilopsis sallei (black-striped mussel)
- Mytilus galloprovincialis (Mediterranean mussel)
- Nassarius sinarus (Nassarius snail)
- Perna viridis (Asian green mussel)
- Pomacea canaliculata (channeled applesnail)
- Potamopyrgus antipodarum (New Zealand mud snail)
- Rumina decollata (decollate snail)
- Xenostrobus securis (small brown mussel)

=== Other Animals ===
- Molgula manhattensis (sea grapes)
- Polyandrocarpa zorritensis
- Bursaphelenchus xylophilus (pine wood nematode)
- Globodera rostochiensis (golden nematode)
- Platydemus manokwari (New Guinea flatworm)
- Ficopomatus enigmaticus (Australian tubeworm)
- Hydroides elegans
- Bugula neritina (brown bryozoan)

== Africa ==
=== Mammals ===
- African savanna elephant in Swaziland (reintroduced)
- Wild boar (native to certain parts of North Africa; introduced populations rare and concentrated in the southern part of the continent)
- Black wildebeest (in Namibia)
- Impala (in Gabon)
- Sable antelope (in Swaziland)
- Nyala (in Botswana and Namibia)
- Feral goat
- Ammotragus lervia (Barbary sheep) onto Canary Islands from mainland Africa
- Ovis orientalis (mouflon) onto Canary Islands
- European rabbit (introduced mainly to islands; native to a small area in northwestern Africa)
- European hare - on Réunion
- Indian hare
- Coypu - Kenya
- Fallow deer
- Himalayan tahr (largely eradicated)
- Rusa deer
- Red deer - South Africa
- Feral horse - see Namib Desert Horse
- Feral donkey
- Feral cat
- Feral dog
- House mouse
- Brown rat
- Black rat
- Gray squirrel (restricted to the extreme southwestern corner of the continent)
- Crab-eating macaque - Mauritius
- Small Asian mongoose - Mauritius
- Small Indian civet - Madagascar
- Asian house shrew
- Tailless tenrec - Comoros, Mauritius, Réunion, and Seychelles
- Common brown lemur from Madagascar (in the island of Mayotte)

=== Birds ===
- Acridotheres tristis (common myna)
- Agapornis fischeri (Fischer's lovebird) - coastal Tanzania and Kenya from inland
- Agapornis personatus (yellow-collared lovebird) - Kenya from Tanzania
- Alectoris barbara (Barbary partridge) - onto Canary Islands from mainland
- Alectoris rufa (red-legged partridge)
- Amandava amandava (red avadavat)
- Anas platyrhynchos (mallard)
- Bubulcus ibis (cattle egret) – Seychelles
- Carduelis carduelis (European goldfinch) – Cape Verde
- Columba livia (rock dove)
- Corvus splendens (house crow)
- Coturnix coturnix (common quail) - Réunion
- Crithagra mozambica (yellow-fronted canary) - numerous islands from mainland
- Cygnus olor (mute swan) - South Africa
- Estrilda astrild (common waxbill) - numerous islands from mainland
- Foudia madagascariensis (red fody) – Indian Ocean islands from mainland
- Francolinus pintadeanus (Chinese francolin) - Mauritius
- Francolinus pondicerianus (grey francolin)
- Fringilla coelebs (chaffinch) - restricted to a few suburbs of Cape Town, a city in the southwest of South Africa
- Gallus gallus (red junglefowl)
- Geopelia striata (zebra dove)
- Padda oryzivora (Java sparrow)
- Lonchura punctulata (scaly-breasted munia)
- Oxyura jamaicensis (ruddy duck)
- Passer domesticus (house sparrow)
- Ploceus cucullatus (village weaver) - Mauritius
- Psittacula krameri (rose-ringed parakeet)
- Pycnonotus jocosus (red-whiskered bulbul)
- Quelea quelea (red-billed quelea) - on to Réunion
- Serinus canicollis (Cape canary) - Réunion
- Spilopelia chinensis (spotted dove)
- Streptopelia roseogrisea (African collared dove) - onto Canary Islands from mainland
- Sturnus vulgaris (common starling)
- Tyto alba (western barn owl)

=== Reptiles ===
- Wattle-necked softshell turtle
- Emys orbicularis (European pond turtle)
- Gehyra mutilata (stump-tailed gecko)
- Hemidactylus frenatus (common house gecko)
- Lepidodactylus lugubris (mourning gecko)
- Tarentola mauritanica (Moorish wall gecko)
- Trachemys scripta ssp. elegans (red-eared slider)
- Alligator snapping turtle - South Africa

=== Amphibians ===
- Amietophrynus gutturalis (guttural toad)

=== Fish ===
- Ctenopharyngodon idella (grass carp)
- Cyprinus carpio (common carp)
- Gambusia affinis (western mosquitofish)
- Gambusia holbrooki (eastern mosquitofish)
- Hypophthalmichthys molitrix (silver carp)
- Lates niloticus (Nile perch)
- Lepomis macrochirus (bluegill)
- Micropterus dolomieu (smallmouth bass)
- Micropterus floridanus (Florida bass)
- Micropterus punctulatus (spotted bass)
- Micropterus salmoides (largemouth bass)
- Oreochromis niloticus (Nile tilapia)
- Perca fluviatilis (European perch)
- Pterygoplichthys disjunctivus (vermiculated sailfin catfish)
- Salmo salar (Atlantic salmon)
- Tinca tinca (tench)

=== Crustaceans ===
- Carcinus maenas (European shore crab)
- Cherax quadricarinatus (redclaw crayfish)
- Limnoria quadripunctata (gribble)
- Percnon gibbesi (Sally Lightfoot crab)
- Procambarus clarkii (red swamp crawfish)
- Procambarus fallax (Marmorkrebs)

=== Insects ===
- Aedes albopictus (Asian tiger mosquito)
- Aleurodicus dispersus (spiralling whitefly)
- Aleurothrixus floccosus (woolly whitefly)
- Aleurotrachelus atratus (palm-infesting whitefly)
- Anoplolepis gracilipes (yellow crazy ant)
- Aphis spiraecola (green citrus aphid)
- Aulacaspis yasumatsui (cycad aulacaspis scale)
- Bactrocera cucurbitae (melon fly)
- Bactrocera dorsalis (Oriental fruit fly)
- Bactrocera invadens (Asian fruit fly)
- Bactrocera zonata (peach fruit fly)
- Bemisia tabaci (silverleaf whitefly)
- Cactoblastis cactorum (cactus moth)
- Ceratitis capitata (Mediterranean fruit fly)
- Ceratitis rosa (Natal fruit fly)
- Chionaspis pinifoliae (pine needle scale insect)
- Cinara cupressi (cypress aphid)
- Coptotermes formosanus (Formosan subterranean termite)
- Cosmopolites sordidus (banana root borer)
- Cryptotermes brevis (West Indian drywood termite)
- Ctenarytaina eucalypti (blue gum psyllid)
- Diuraphis noxia (Russian wheat aphid)
- Eulachnus rileyi (pine needle aphid)
- Euwallacea fornicatus (tea shot hole borer)
- Frankliniella occidentalis (western flower thrips)
- Harmonia axyridis (Asian lady beetle)
- Hylastes ater (black pine bark beetle)
- Hylurgus ligniperda (red-haired pine bark beetle)
- Icerya purchasi (cottony cushion scale)
- Linepithema humile (Argentine ant)
- Liriomyza trifolii (American serpentine leafminer)
- Maconellicoccus hirsutus (hibiscus mealybug)
- Orthotomicus erosus (Mediterranean pine engraver)
- Phenacoccus manihoti (cassava mealybug)
- Phenacoccus solenopsis (cotton mealybug)
- Pineus pini (pine woolly aphid)
- Polistes dominula (European paper wasp)
- Prostephanus truncatus (larger grain borer)
- Pseudococcus calceolariae (Citrophilus mealybug)
- Sirex noctilio (Sirex woodwasp)
- Spodoptera frugiperda (fall armyworm)
- Technomyrmex albipes (white-footed ant)
- Thaumastocoris peregrinus (bronze bug)
- Trialeurodes ricini (castor bean whitefly)
- Trichomyrmex destructor (destructive trailing ant)
- Vespula germanica (European wasp)
- Wasmannia auropunctata (electric ant)
- Xyleborinus saxesenii (fruit-tree pinhole borer)
- Xyleborus perforans (island pinhole borer)
- Xylosandrus compactus (black twig borer)

=== Molluscs ===
- Aplexa marmorata (marbled tadpole snail)
- Bradybaena similaris (Asian trampsnail)
- Cochlicella barbara (potbellied helicellid)
- Cornu aspersum (garden snail)
- Deroceras invadens (tramp slug)
- Deroceras laeve (marsh slug)
- Euglandina rosea (rosy wolfsnail)
- Limax flavus (yellow slug)
- Milax gagates (greenhouse slug)
- Mytilus galloprovincialis (Mediterranean mussel)
- Pinctada radiata (Gulf pearl oyster)
- Pseudosuccinea columella (mimic lymnaea)
- Semimytilus algosus (Pacific mussel)
- Tarebia granifera (quilted melania)
- Theba pisana (white garden snail)
- Zonitoides arboreus (quick gloss)

=== Worms ===
- Ficopomatus enigmaticus (Australian tubeworm)
- Boccardia proboscidea (shell worm)

=== Other Animals ===
- Ciona intestinalis (sea vase)

=== Plants ===
- Brazilian pepper tree
- Bugweed
- Camphor tree
- Spanish broom
- Prickly pear
- Stone pine
- Cluster pine
- Pampas grass
- Guava
- St John's wort
- Weeping willow
- Water hyacinth
- Acacia cyclops
- Acacia mearnsii
- Acacia saligna
- Valeriana rubra
- Eucalyptus
- Hakea
- Lantana
- Tipuana tipu

== Oceania and remote islands ==
=== Mammals ===
- Bos taurus (cattle)
- Bos javanicus (Banteng)– Cobourg peninsula
- Bubalus bubalis (water buffalo)
- Canis familiaris (dog)
- Capra aegagrus (feral goat)
- Equus africanus (donkey)
- Felis catus (feral cat)
- Urva auropunctata (small Asian mongoose) – Fiji
- Macaca fascicularis (crab-eating macaque)
- Mus musculus (house mouse)
- Mustela putorius (ferret) – Azores
- Oryctolagus cuniculus (European rabbit)
- Ovis aries (sheep)
- Rattus norvegicus (brown rat)
- Rattus rattus (black rat)
- Rusa marianna (Philippine deer)
- Sciurus carolinensis (eastern gray squirrel) - Pitcairn Islands
- Suncus murinus (Asian house shrew)
- Sus scrofa (wild boar)

=== Birds ===
- Acridotheres fuscus (jungle myna)
- Acridotheres tristis (common myna)
- Alectoris chukar (chukar partridge) - Saint Helena
- Amandava amandava (red avadavat)
- Anas acuta (northern pintail) - Île Amsterdam
- Anas platyrhynchos (mallard) - arrived naturally at Macquarie Island from introduced populations in New Zealand and Australia
- Bubulcus ibis (cattle egret) - Chagos Archipelago
- Cacatua galerita (sulphur-crested cockatoo) - Palau
- Callipepla californica (California quail) - Norfolk Island
- Chloris chloris (European greenfinch) - Azores
- Circus approximans (swamp harrier) - Tahiti
- Columba livia (rock dove)
- Corvus moneduloides (New Caledonian crow) - Maré Island
- Crithagra flaviventris (yellow canary) - Saint Helena, Ascension Island
- Dicrurus macrocercus (black drongo) - Mariana Islands
- Diuca diuca (common diuca finch) - Easter Island
- Eclectus roratus (eclectus parrot) - Palau
- Estrilda astrild (common waxbill)
- Excalfactoria chinensis (king quail) - Guam
- Foudia madagascariensis (red fody) - Chagos Archipelago, Saint Helena
- Francolinus francolinus (black francolin) - Guam
- Gallinula chloropus (common moorhen) - Saint Helena
- Gallus gallus (red junglefowl)
- Geopelia striata (zebra dove) - Saint Helena
- Gymnorhina tibicen (Australian magpie) - Fiji
- Lonchura atricapilla (chestnut munia) - Palau
- Lonchura castaneothorax (chestnut-breasted mannikin)
- Lonchura punctulata (scaly-breasted munia)
- Neochmia temporalis (red-browed finch) - French Polynesia
- Nesoenas picturatus (Malagasy turtle dove) - Chagos Archipelago
- Nothoprocta perdicaria (Chilean tinamou) - Easter Island
- Padda oryzivora (Java sparrow)
- Passer domesticus (house sparrow)
- Passer montanus (Eurasian tree sparrow)
- Phalcoboenus chimango (chimango caracara) - Easter Island
- Phasianus colchicus (common pheasant) - Saint Helena
- Platycercus elegans (crimson rosella) - Norfolk Island
- Pternistis afer (red-necked spurfowl) - Ascension Island
- Pycnonotus cafer (red-vented bulbul)
- Ramphocelus dimidiatus (crimson-backed tanager) – Tahiti
- Spilopelia chinensis (spotted dove) - New Caledonia, Fiji
- Streptopelia dusumieri (Philippine collared dove) - Mariana Islands
- Sturnus vulgaris (common starling)
- Vini kuhlii (Kuhl's lorikeet) - Kiribati
- Zosterops lateralis (silvereye) - Tahiti

=== Reptiles ===
- Boiga irregularis (brown tree snake)
- Hemidactylus frenatus (common house gecko)
- Lacerta dugesii (Madeiran wall lizard) - Azores
- Iguana iguana (green iguana) – Fiji
- Trachemys scripta (red-eared slider)

=== Amphibians ===
- Duttaphrynus melanostictus (Asian common toad) - New Guinea
- Eleutherodactylus planirostris (greenhouse frog) - Guam
- Rhinella marina (cane toad)
- Xenopus laevis (African clawed frog) - Ascension Island

=== Insects ===
- Adoretus sinicus (Chinese rose beetle)
- Aedes albopictus (tiger mosquito)
- Aleurotrachelus atratus (palm-infesting whitefly) – Samoa
- Anoplolepis gracilipes (yellow crazy ant)
- Aphis spiraecola (green citrus aphid)
- Aulacaspis yasumatsui (cycad aulacaspis scale)
- Bactrocera cucurbitae (melon fly)
- Bactrocera dorsalis (Oriental fruit fly)
- Blattella germanica (German cockroach)
- Cactoblastis cactorum (cactus moth)
- Cerataphis lataniae (palm aphid) – Guam
- Ceratitis capitata (Mediterranean fruit fly)
- Coptotermes formosanus (Formosan subterranean termite) - Marshall Islands
- Crocidosema plebejana (cotton tipworm)
- Cryptotermes brevis (West Indian drywood termite)
- Ctenarytaina eucalypti (blue gum psyllid) – Azores
- Culex quinquefasciatus (southern house mosquito)
- Euwallacea destruens
- Euwallacea fornicatus (tea shot hole borer)
- Euwallacea piceus
- Homalodisca vitripennis (glassy-winged sharpshooter) - French Polynesia
- Hylurgus ligniperda (red-haired pine bark beetle) - Saint Helena
- Icerya purchasi (cottony cushion scale)
- Kallitaxila crini (green tropiduchid) – Guam
- Linepithema humile (Argentine ant)
- Maconellicoccus hirsutus (hibiscus mealybug)
- Macrosiphum euphorbiae (potato aphid)
- Monomorium pharaonis (pharaoh ant)
- Omorgus suberosus (hide beetle)
- Orthotomicus erosus (Mediterranean pine beetle) – Fiji
- Paratrechina longicornis (longhorn crazy ant)
- Pheidole megacephala (big-headed ant)
- Phenacoccus solenopsis (cotton mealybug) - New Caledonia
- Polistes chinensis (Japanese paper wasp) - Norfolk Island
- Pseudococcus viburni (obscure mealybug)
- Quadrastichus erythrinae (Erythrina gall wasp)
- Simosyrphus grandicornis (common hover fly)
- Solenopsis geminata (tropical fire ant)
- Sophonia orientalis (two-spotted leafhopper) - French Polynesia
- Tapinoma melanocephalum (ghost ant)
- Tapinoma minutum (dwarf pedicel ant) – Cook Islands
- Trichomyrmex destructor (destructive trailing ant)
- Vespula germanica (European wasp) - Ascension Island
- Vespula vulgaris (common wasp) - Saint Helena
- Wasmannia auropunctata (electric ant)
- Xyleborinus saxesenii (fruit-tree pinhole borer) – New Guinea
- Xyleborus perforans (island pinhole borer)
- Xyleborus similis
- Xyleborus volvulus
- Xylosandrus compactus (black twig borer)
- Xylosandrus crassiusculus (Asian ambrosia beetle)
- Xylosandrus morigerus (brown twig beetle)

=== Molluscs ===
- Cornu aspersum (garden snail)
- Deroceras invadens (tramp slug)
- Deroceras laeve (marsh slug)
- Euglandina rosea (rosy wolfsnail)
- Gonaxis kibweziensis (kibwezi gonaxis)
- Limax maximus (great grey slug) - Saint Helena, Azores
- Lissachatina fulica (giant African snail)
- Magallana gigas (Pacific oyster)
- Mytilopsis sallei (black-striped mussel) – Fiji
- Oxychilus alliarius (garlic snail)
- Perna viridis (Asian green mussel) – Fiji
- Pinctada radiata (Atlantic pearl-oyster) – Azores
- Pomacea canaliculata (channeled applesnail) – Guam, New Guinea
- Veronicella cubensis (Cuban slug)

=== Worms ===
- Globodera rostochiensis (golden nematode) - Norfolk Island
- Platydemus manokwari (New Guinea flatworm)

== See also ==
- Introduced species
- List of invasive species
- Invasive species in South America
- List of adventive wild plants in Israel
- Norwegian Black List
- List of introduced bird species
- List of introduced mammal species
