= Norwegian Black List =

List of invasive species in Norway

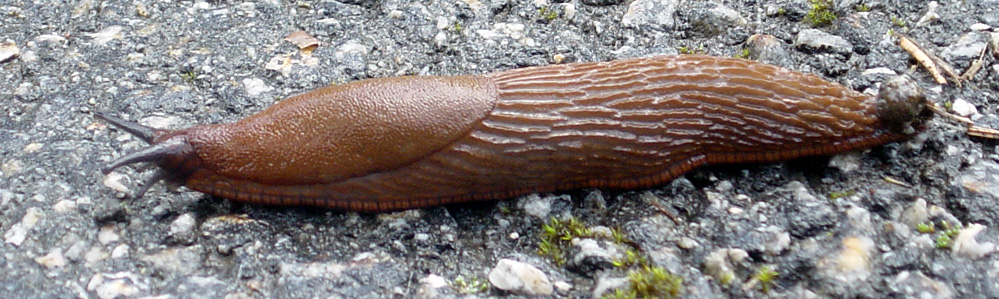
The Spanish slug is one of the species on the Norwegian Black List.

The Norwegian Black List (Fremmedartslista) is an overview of alien species in Norway, with ecological risk assessments for some of the species. The Norwegian Black List was first published in 2007 by the Norwegian Biodiversity Information Centre and developed in cooperation with 18 scientific experts from six research institutions.

The 2007 Norwegian Black List is the first issue, and is compiled as a counterpart to the Norwegian Red List of 2006.

== The 2007 Norwegian Black List ==
The 2007 Norwegian Black List contains a total of 2483 species of plants, animals and other organisms, 217 of which are risk assessed. A set of criteria has been developed to ensure a standardised assessment of the ecological consequences of alien species.

The assessed species are placed in categories according to the risk they represent.

- High risk – 93 species
- Unknown risk – 83 species
- Low risk – 41 species

Alien species on Svalbard, Bjørnøya and Jan Mayen are not assessed.

== Result ==
Among the 93 species which are found to threaten the natural local biodiversity, are bacteria, macroalgae, microalgae, pseudofungi, fungi, mosses, vascular plants, comb jellies, flatworms, roundworms, crustaceans, arachnids, insects, snails, bivalves, tunicates, fishes and mammals.

Among the vascular plants with a high risk, are Heracleum tromsoensis (aka Heracleum persicum), sycamore maple (Acer pseudoplatanus) and garden lupin (Lupinus polyphyllus). Among the flatworms; Gyrodactylus salaris, among the crustaceans the red king crab (Paralithodes camtschaticus) and American lobster (Homarus americanus). Five species of mammals are noted as high risk species; West European hedgehog, European rabbit, southern vole, American mink and raccoon.

== See also ==
- IUCN Red List
