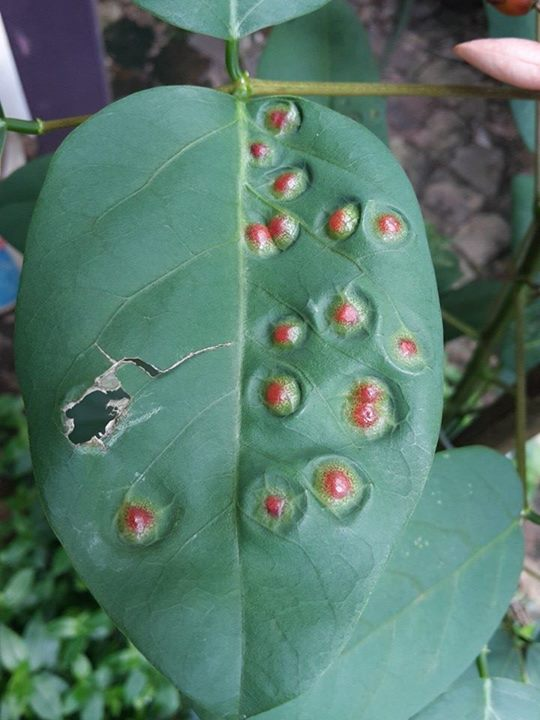

Scientific classification
- Kingdom: Animalia
- Phylum: Arthropoda
- Clade: Pancrustacea
- Class: Insecta
- Order: Hymenoptera
- Family: Eulophidae
- Genus: Quadrastichus
- Species: Q. erythrinae

Binomial name
- Quadrastichus erythrinae Kim, 2004

= Quadrastichus erythrinae =

Species of wasp

Quadrastichus erythrinae Kim, 2004, (quadra=four, stichus=line, erythrinae=of erythrina) is a small parasitoid wasp belonging to the family Eulophidae, but also a secondary phytophage by way of inducing galls on the leaves, stems, petioles and young shoots of various Erythrina species.

Q. erythrinae was identified in 2004 in Erythrina galls collected in Singapore, Mauritius and Réunion. Eurytoma is a genus of wasps belonging to the family Eurytomidae of which some are parasitoids of Quadrastichus species; a parasitoid from the Eulophidae is Aprostocetus exertus.

== Description ==
The female Quadrastichus erythrinae is described by as having dark brown coloring with yellow markings with the exception of the genae, which are brown on the back, the head is yellow. With the exception of the scape, which is pale in the back, the antennae are pale brown. The pronotum has a deep brown color. An inverted triangle or "V" shaped region extending from the anterior border to the midlobe of the mesoscutum is dark brown, with the remaining portion being yellow. That's a yellow scapula. The dorsellum, axillae, and scutellum are light brown to brown in color. There is a dark brown propodeum. Brown metasoma is present. The coxae at the front and rear are brown. The mid-coxa is nearly white. Most of the femora are light brown to brown in color.

For the males, both the antenna and head are pallid. It is dark brown in the pronotum. Pale brown is the color of the dorsellum and scutellum. Axillae are pallid. Dark brown is the propodeum's color. The front part of the metasoma is pale, while the remaining portion is dark brown. Every leg has a pale color.

== Mechanism ==
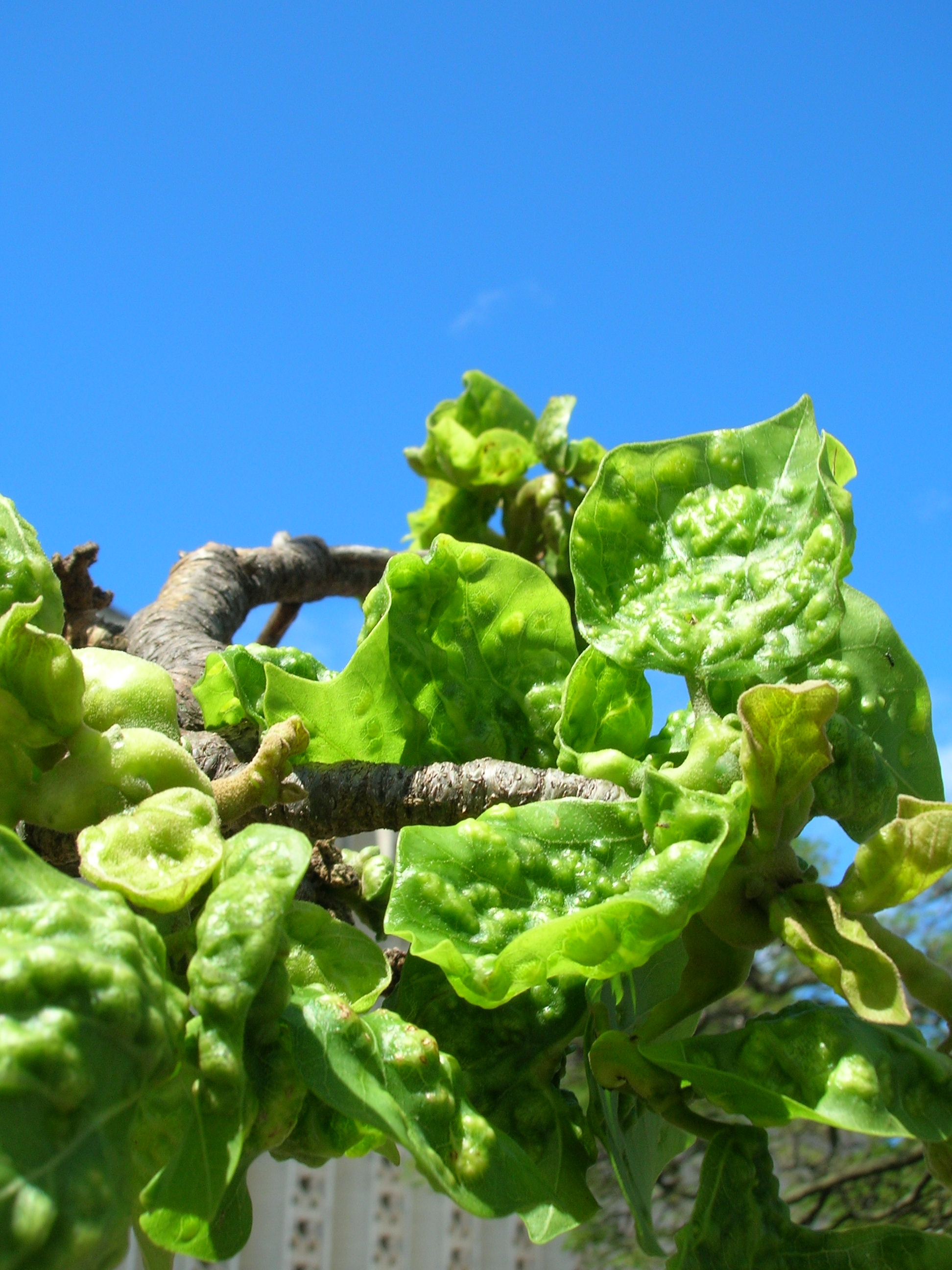
Deformation of Erythrina variegata leaves by Quadrastichus erythrinae galls. Oahu, Hawaii

The female induces galls in the leaves, shoots, petioles and inflorescences of the plant. During the development of the gall, the affected organ is deformed, and the petioles and shoots become swollen.

== Distribution ==
First collected in Florida on coral trees Erythrina variegata, now in Miami and Hawaii; also known from Singapore, Mauritius and Reunion, Taiwan, Hong Kong, China, India, Thailand, Philippines, American Samoa, Guam and in the Amami Islands and Okinawa in Japan. In Hawaii, it was first observed on the island of Oahu and later spread amongst other neighboring islands with major infestations on endemic Erythrina sandwicensis and introduced E. variegata. It was then treated with parasitoid Eurytoma erythrinae, which proved to be very effective in reducing the population of Erythrina gall wasps.
