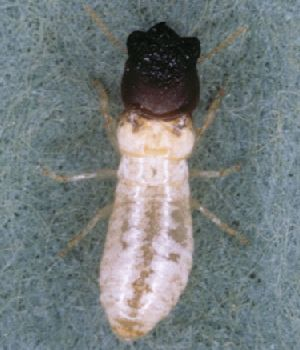
- Cryptotermes brevis soldier

Scientific classification
- Domain: Eukaryota
- Kingdom: Animalia
- Phylum: Arthropoda
- Class: Insecta
- Order: Blattodea
- Infraorder: Isoptera
- Family: Kalotermitidae
- Genus: Cryptotermes
- Species: C. brevis

Binomial name
- Cryptotermes brevis (Walker, 1853)

Synonyms
- Calotermes brevis; Calotermes piceatus; Calotermes pseudobrevis; Cryptotermes grassii; Cryptotermes piceatus; Cryptotermes pseudobrevis; Cryptotermes rospigliosi; Kalotermes brevis; Kalotermes piceatus; Kalotermes pseudobrevis

= Cryptotermes brevis =

Species of termite

Cryptotermes brevis is a species of termite in the family Kalotermitidae, commonly known as the West Indian drywood termite or the powderpost termite. It is able to live completely inside timber structures or articles made of wood such as furniture without any outside source of water. It is frequently introduced into new locations inadvertently, and causes damage to the structural timbers of buildings and to wooden objects such as furniture.

== Description ==
As eusocial insects, West Indian drywood termites build a colonial nest and live inside timbers, creating chambers for rearing larvae and short galleries. They resemble other drywood species in being larger and deeper-bodied than underground-dwelling termites, having shorter limbs and walking more slowly. Apart from the reproductive class, all other members of the colony are blind. They have strong jaws for chewing wood fibre, claws for gripping wooden surfaces and antennae resembling the beads of a necklace strung together.

The colony consists of several different castes; reproductives including a queen, king and alates (unmated winged termites); soldiers; and pseudergates (false workers). The king and queen have dark brown, chitinous cuticles but other members of the colony have soft bodies. The soldiers are about 4 to 5 mm (0.16 to 0.20 in) long with colourless bodies and black, wrinkled, squarish heads. Their mandibles are relatively small and they can use their heads to block galleries to prevent marauding ants from gaining access to the nest. The sausage-shaped pseudergates are immature termites that perform the functions of a worker caste and care for the brood, excavate tunnels, consume wood and feed the other members of the colony. The alates have two pairs of transparent membranous wings with dark veins running along near the leading edge. Identification of termites species is difficult and is usually made as a result of the appearance and structure of the soldiers' heads.

== Distribution ==
Cryptotermes brevis is more frequently introduced into new locations than any other termite species in the world. It was first described by the British entomologist Francis Walker from a location in Jamaica in 1853 but it is not thought to have originated in the West Indies. As a drywood termite, it is able to extract enough moisture from the wood in which it lives for survival and can thus easily be transported unknowingly to new locations. It may have originated in the Neotropics and spread to Jamaica and elsewhere in ships made of wood or in wooden articles such as furniture. Since then it further spread by similar means to other Caribbean islands and reached the maritime fringes of the southeastern United States before 1919. Cryptotermes brevis is now widely distributed worldwide. It is present in the Caribbean region, United States, Central America, tropical South America, Peru, Chile, St Helena, tropical Africa, South Africa and Madagascar. It is also invasive in Australia, where it was first observed in 1966, as well as New Caledonia, New Zealand, French Polynesia and Fiji, and has been reported from Egypt, Italy and Spain.

== Life cycle ==
The Cryptotermes brevis queen lays kidney-shaped eggs and these and the developing larvae are cared for by the pseudergates. After several moults they become pseudergates and assist in the work of the colony. At a later date, some pseudergates develop wing pads and become nymphs, which after three further moults grow into alates, reproductive termites with wings. Others go on to become presoldiers with white heads and, after another moult, soldiers with black heads. There are about fifty pseudergates for every soldier in the colony, and alates are only present in the nest at certain times of year. Alates emerge from the colony through temporary holes during the swarming season. In Florida, the dispersal flights take place at night from April to June. The alates are poor fliers and on landing, soon shed their wings. A male and female pair then searches for a suitable timber structure in which to found a new colony. They enter through a hole or crack, seal the entrance with an intestinal secretion and excavate a brood chamber. The first batch of eggs is cared for by the couple for several months but after the larvae have developed into pseudergates, the pair can concentrate on egg-laying. The first soldier does not appear until the second or third years and alates may develop around year five. A mature colony may contain over a thousand termites and survive for upward of ten years.

== Damage ==
Cryptotermes brevis infests sound softwood and hardwood timbers, both structural wood in buildings and moveable objects. Several colonies can co-exist in a single structure and objects as small as picture frames can be attacked. The pseudergates excavate galleries through the timber but leave a thin veneer of surface wood intact. One wooden door was found to house twenty colonies, judging by the number of reproductive pairs of termites found inside. In the later stages of an infestation the surface of the object may bulge or blister. Small holes known as "kick-out holes" 1 to 2 mm (0.04 to 0.08 in) in diameter are sometimes made through which frass (faecal pellets) can be pushed out, accumulating in a conical, dusty pile below. The pellets are hexagonal in cross section and vary in colour, having one rounded and one tapered end, a shape characteristic of Cryptotermes brevis. Other signs of infestation are the swarming of alates or the presence of shed wings. Cryptotermes brevis is more destructive in habitations than other species in the genus Cryptotermes which require a moister environment. In the United States, this termite causes damage in excess of $100 million annually, and a great deal more than this worldwide.
