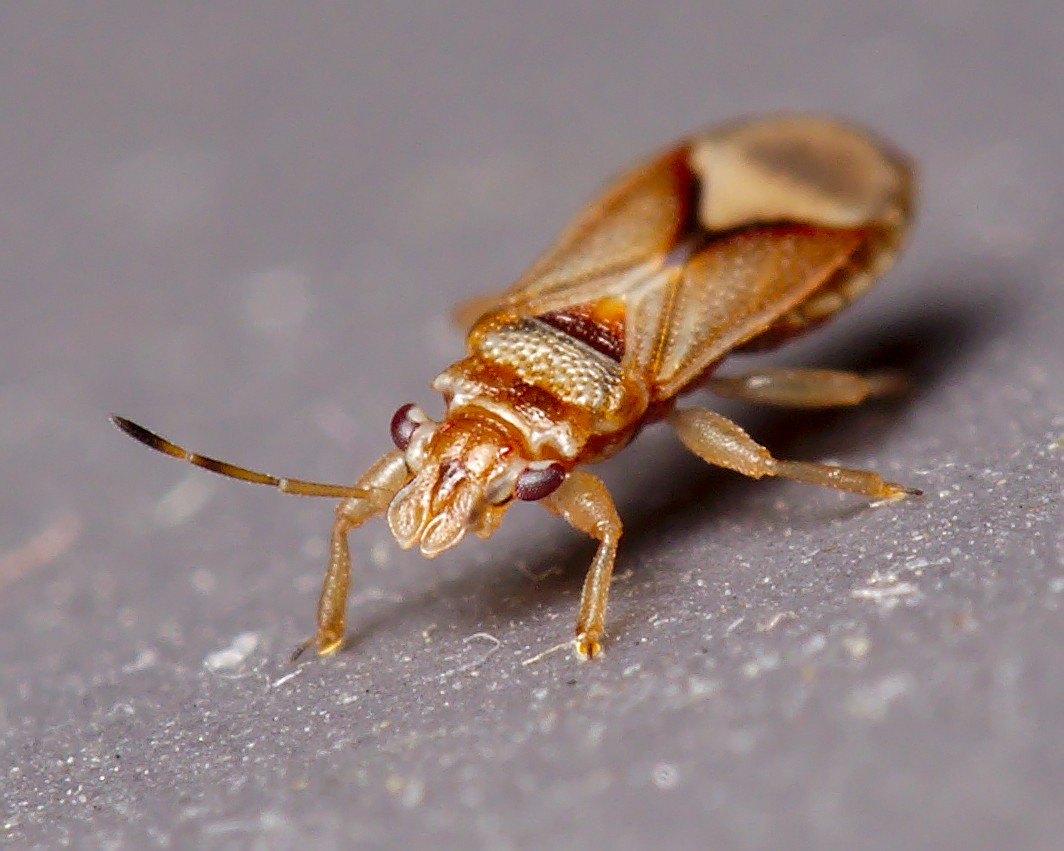

Scientific classification
- Kingdom: Animalia
- Phylum: Arthropoda
- Class: Insecta
- Order: Hemiptera
- Suborder: Heteroptera
- Family: Thaumastocoridae
- Genus: Thaumastocoris
- Species: T. peregrinus

Binomial name
- Thaumastocoris peregrinus Carpintero & Dellapé, 2006

= Thaumastocoris peregrinus =

Species of true bug

Thaumastocoris peregrinus, the bronze bug, is a true bug first described from Argentina, but is probably native to Australia. The species has been recorded in Africa (Kenya, Malawi, South Africa, Zimbabwe), Europe (Albania, Italy, Portugal, Spain), Middle East (Israel), North America (Mexico, California), South America (Argentina, Brazil, Chile, Paraguay, Uruguay), Caribbean, and New Zealand as a pest of eucalyptus.

== Description ==
Adult. Body dorsoventrally compressed and elongate. Submacropterous forms are known for both sexes. Male length 2.3–2.9 mm, width 0.7–1.0 mm; female length 2.3–2.7 mm, width 0.7–0.8 mm. Coloration light brown with darker areas; female generally darker than male. Head broad, strongly projecting anteriorly, with semiglobose projecting eyes. Mandibular plates elongate, conspicuous, strongly recurved anterolaterally. Labium extending to level of fore coxa. Thorax: pronotum with tubercle on anterolateral angle of anterior lobe. Legs: neither parempodia nor pulvilli present; all tibiae with flattened apical projection, the fossula spongiosa. Tibia of male anteroventrally with three black tubercles, female without such tubercles. Male reproductive tract comprises a pair of testes with three globular follicles isolated by a peritoneal sheath, and two pairs of well-developed mesodermal tubular accessory glands. Male external genitalia comprise an asymmetrical and somewhat cylindrical pygophore, oriented either to the right or to the left, although orientation to the right occurs more frequently. The genitalia also comprise a U-shaped evenly setose paramere; setae becoming sparse apically. Aedeagus not observed. Female reproductive tract of T. peregrinus is generally similar to that of the thaumastocorid Proxylastodoris kuscheli. However P. kuscheli has three meroistic telotrophic ovarioles per ovary, whereas T. peregrinus has only two meroistic telotrophic ovarioles per ovary. The ovaries are developed as large, ball-shaped reservoirs. In Heteroptera, the number of ovarioles per ovary ranges from 2 to 17. No spermathecae were observed, a phenomenon already reported for other Thaumastocoridae.

Eggs black, ovoid, with rough chorion and a round operculum, with a deep and obvious depression dorsally; 0.50–0.61 mm long and 0.20–0.24 mm wide.

Nymphs. Five instars. Body flattened dorsoventrally. Color of young individuals (1st–3rd instars) milk white to orange, with black spots on the thorax and first abdominal segment. Nymphs were always observed together with adults on heavily infested trees.

== Ecology ==
Thaumastocoris peregrinus is common to the east coast of Australia. The sap-sucking pest has infested non-native Eucalyptus plantations of many species, including E. gomphocephala, E. botryoides, E. camaldulensis, E. saligna and E. globulus, in Southern Africa, South America and Europe. Severe infestations of the pest cause leaf loss, leaf senescence, thinning of the canopy and in some cases branch dieback.
