= Small Asian mongoose =

Small Asian mongoose is a common name applied to two mammals which were formerly considered to be a single species:

- Javan mongoose
- Small Indian mongoose
