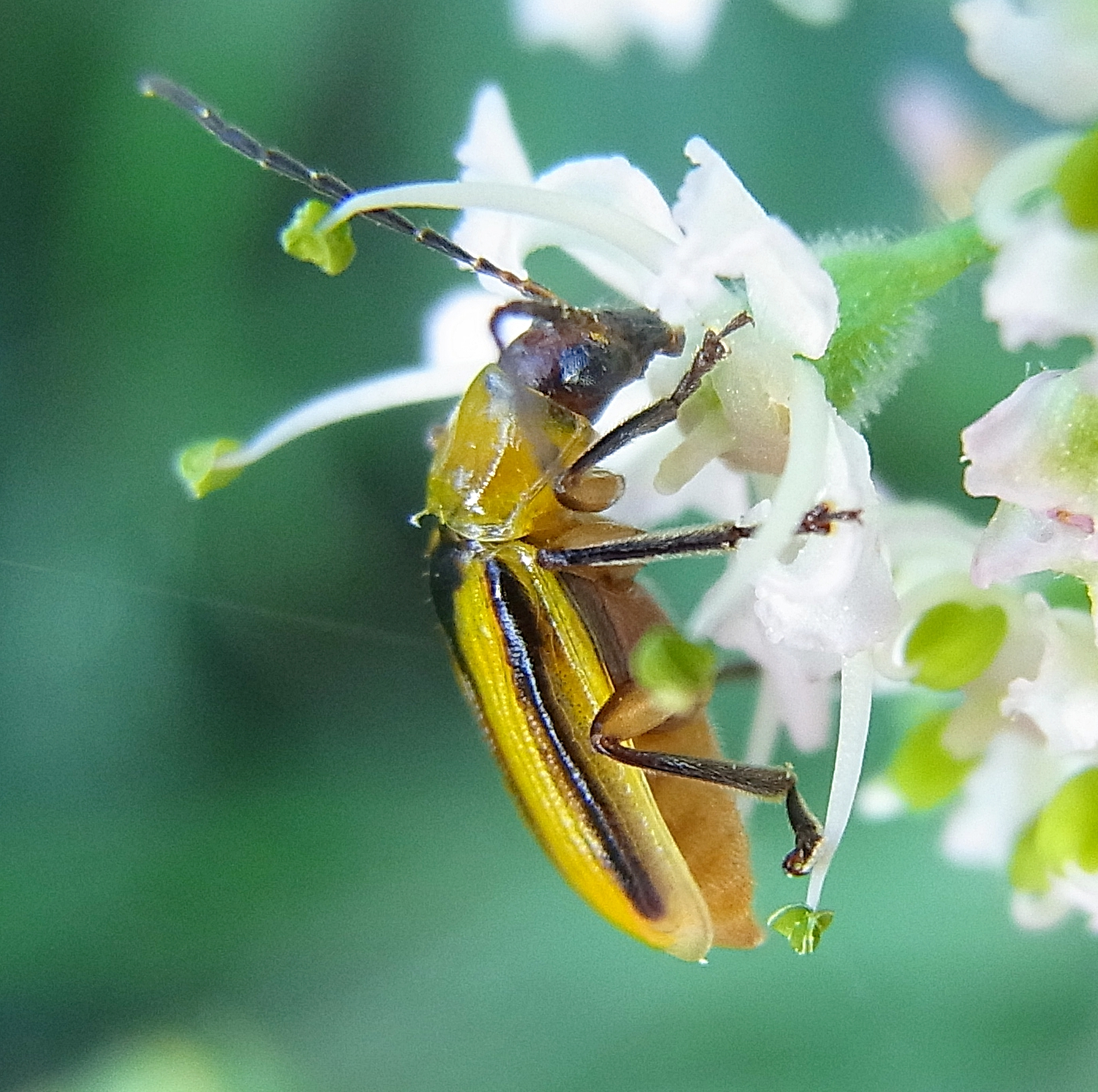

Scientific classification
- Kingdom: Animalia
- Phylum: Arthropoda
- Clade: Pancrustacea
- Class: Insecta
- Order: Coleoptera
- Suborder: Polyphaga
- Infraorder: Cucujiformia
- Family: Chrysomelidae
- Genus: Diabrotica
- Species: D. virgifera

Binomial name
- Diabrotica virgifera LeConte, 1868

Subspecies
- Diabrotica virgifera virgifera LeConte, 1868; Diabrotica virgifera zeae Krysan & Smith, 1987

= Diabrotica virgifera =

Species of beetle

Diabrotica virgifera is a species of beetle in the family Chrysomelidae. It is an agricultural pest species that attacks maize. It includes two subspecies, Diabrotica virgifera virgifera (the western corn rootworm) and Diabrotica virgifera zeae (the Mexican corn rootworm).

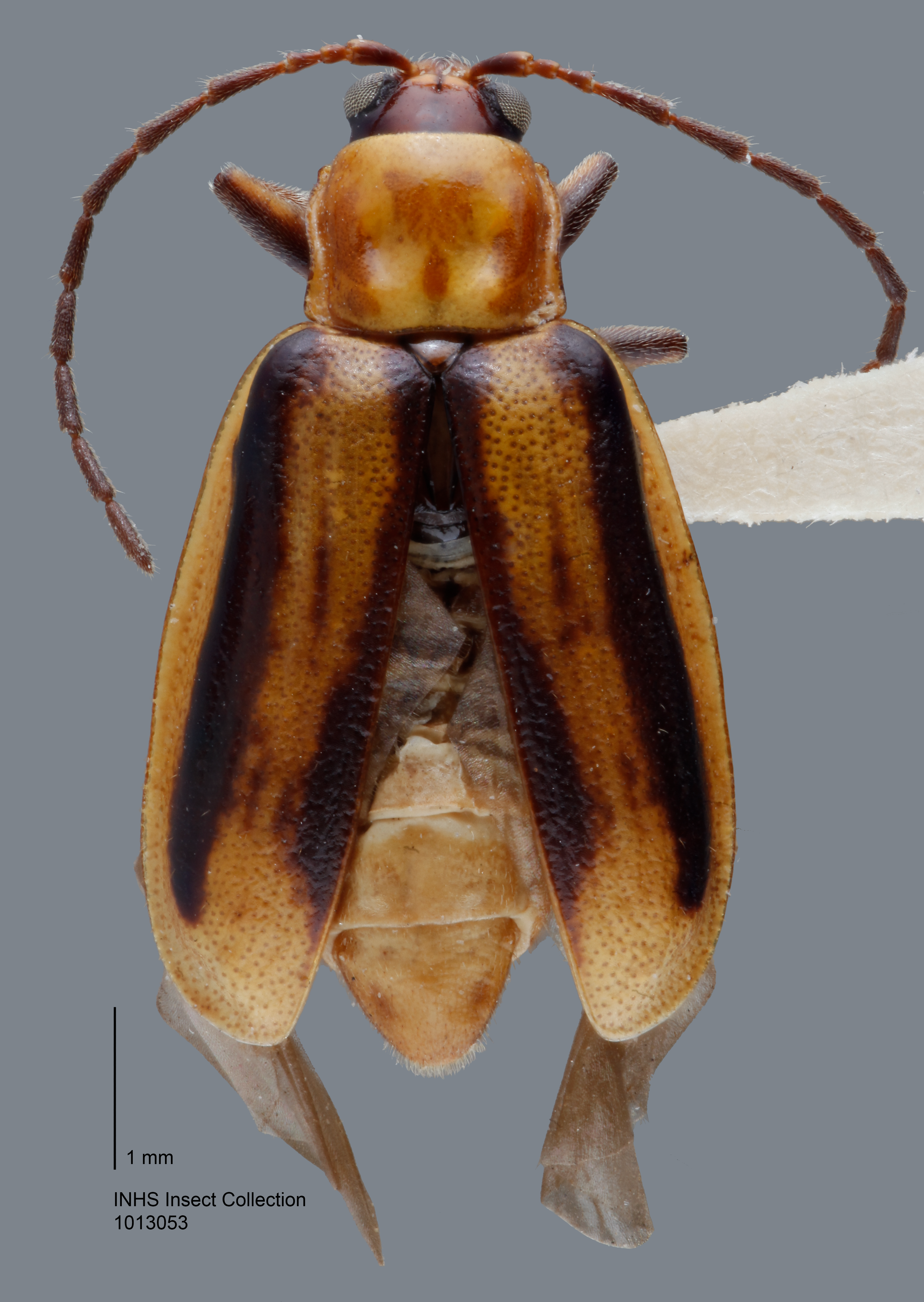
Diabrotica virgifera virgifera.
