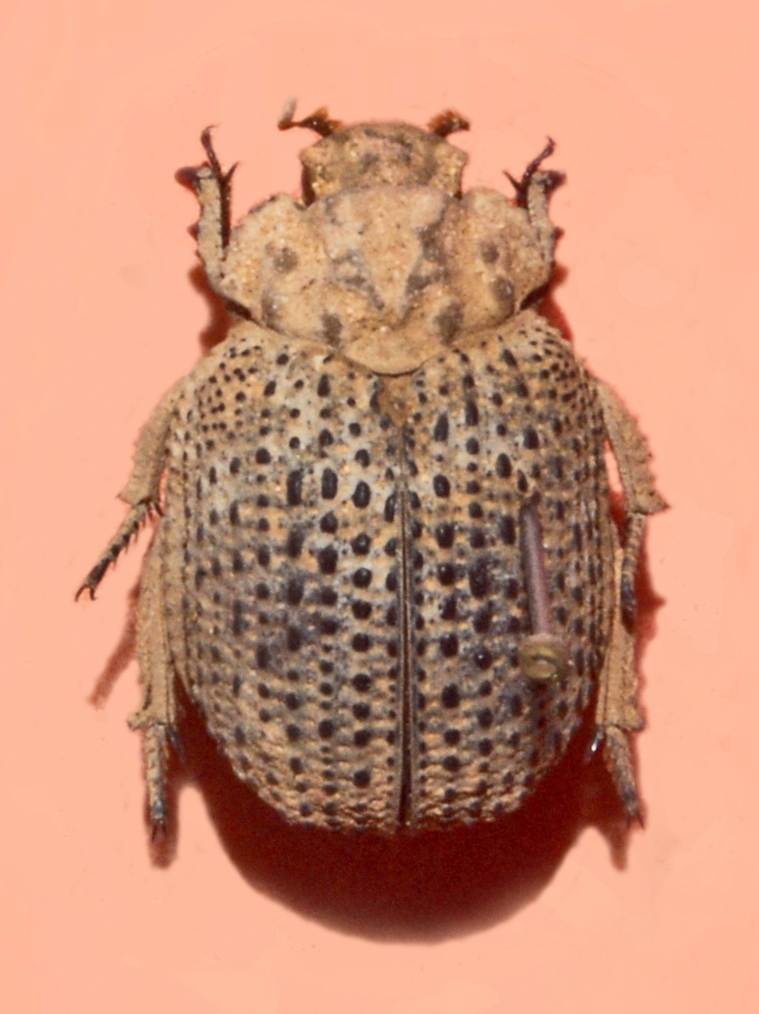
- Omorgus suberosus. Museum specimen

Scientific classification
- Kingdom: Animalia
- Phylum: Arthropoda
- Class: Insecta
- Order: Coleoptera
- Suborder: Polyphaga
- Infraorder: Scarabaeiformia
- Family: Trogidae
- Genus: Omorgus
- Species: O. suberosus

Binomial name
- Omorgus suberosus (Fabricius, 1775)

Synonyms
- Trox alternatus Say, 1831; Trox crenatus Olivier, 1789; Trox denticulatus Palisot de Beauvois, 1818; Trox gibbus Olivier, 1789; Trox manilensis Schultze, 1915; Trox nobilis Wollaston, 1867; Trox ovatus Palisot de Beauvois, 1818; Trox suberosus Fabricius, 1775; Trox torressalai Baguena, 1959; Trox tricolor Blackburn, 1904; Trox triestinae Pittino, 1987

= Omorgus suberosus =

Species of beetle

Omorgus suberosus, common name hide beetle, is a beetle of the family Trogidae.

== Description ==
Omorgus suberosus can reach a length of 11–14 millimetres (0.43–0.55 in). The dorsal surface is convex and very rough, with ridges and tubercles, pale brown in color. Pronotum has long fine setae. These insects are carrion feeders. They overwinter as adults.

== Distribution ==
This species is present in Czech Republic, Hungary, Spain, from southern USA to South America and in Australia (New South Wales, Queensland, Victoria, Western Australia).
