= List of invasive species in Europe =

This is a list of invasive species in Europe. A species is regarded as invasive if it has become introduced to a location, area, or region where it did not previously occur naturally (i.e., is not a native species) and becomes capable of establishing a breeding population in the new location. An invasive species will be one that thrives in its new environment and negatively influences the ecology and biodiversity of that ecosystem. Negative effects can also affect humans, by compromising health (e.g. vectors of diseases) or socioeconomic systems (e.g. damages to agriculture or forestry).

The term invasive species refers to a subset of those species defined as introduced species. If a species has been introduced but remains local, and is not problematic to human systems or to the local biodiversity, then it does not belong on this list.

== Plants ==
- Acacia sp.
- Ailanthus altissima (tree of heaven)
- Alternanthera philoxeroides (alligator weed)
- Amorpha fruticosa (desert false indigo)
- Ambrosia artemisiifolia (Ragweed)
- Asclepias syriaca (common milkweed)
- Baccharis halimifolia (eastern baccharis)
- Buddleja davidii
- Cabomba caroliniana (fanwort)
- Carpobrotus edulis (hottentot fig)
- Clematis vitalba (old man's beard)
- Cortaderia spp.
- Crassula helmsii (Australian swamp stonecrop)
- Eichhornia crassipes (water hyacinth)
- Elodea canadensis (Canadian pondweed)
- Elodea nuttallii (Nuttall's waterweed)
- Gleditsia triacanthos (honey locust)
- Gunnera tinctoria (Chilean rhubarb)
- Heracleum mantegazzianum (giant hogweed)
- Heracleum persicum (Persian hogweed)
- Heracleum sosnowskyi (Sosnowsky's hogweed)
- Hydrocotyle ranunculoides (floating pennywort)
- Impatiens glandulifera (Himalayan balsam)
- Lagarosiphon major (curly waterweed)
- Lantana camara
- Ludwigia grandiflora (water-primrose)
- Ludwigia peploides (floating primrose-willow)
- Lysichiton americanus (American skunk cabbage)
- Myriophyllum aquaticum (parrot feather)
- Myriophyllum heterophyllum (broadleaf watermilfoil)
- Nicotiana glauca
- Oxalis pes-caprae (buttercup oxalis)
- Pennisetum setaceum (crimson fountaingrass)
- Pistia stratiotes (water cabbage)
- Pueraria lobata (kudzu vine)
- Reynoutria japonica (syn. Fallopia japonica) (Japanese knotweed)
- Rhododendron ponticum (pontic rhododendron)
- Robinia pseudoacacia (black locust)
- Rosa rugosa

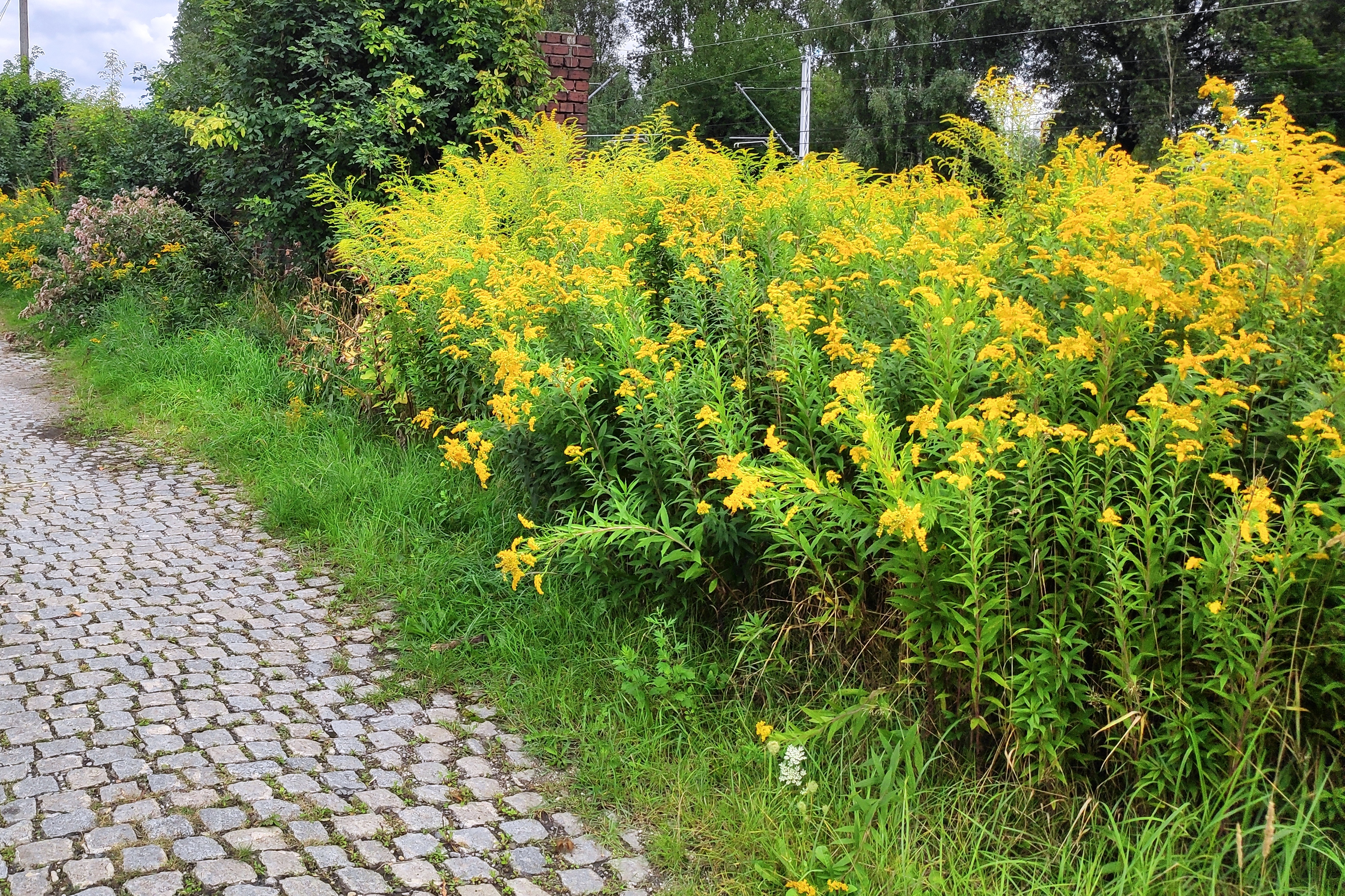
Solidago canadensis (Canada goldenrod)

- Solidago canadensis (Canada goldenrod)
- Tradescantia fluminensis
- Vallisneria spiralis
- Myriophyllum aquaticum (parrot feather watermilfoil)

== Algae ==
- Caulerpa racemosa (grape caulerpa)
- Caulerpa taxifolia (Mediterranean clone)

== Animals ==
=== Bryozoans ===
- Bugula neritina (brown bryozoan)
- Schizoporella errata (branching bryozoan)
- Tricellaria inopinata

=== Cnidarians ===
- Cordylophora caspia (euryhaline hydroid)
- Rhopilema nomadica (nomad jellyfish)

=== Ctenophores ===
- Mnemiopsis leidyi (warty comb jelly)

=== Arthropods ===
==== Crustaceans ====
- Balanus improvisus (bay barnacle)
- Cercopagis pengoi (fishhook waterflea)
- Chelicorophium curvispinum (Caspian mud shrimp)
- Dikerogammarus villosus (killer shrimp)
- Elminius modestus (Australasian barnacle)
- Eriocheir sinensis (Chinese mitten crab)
- Hemigrapsus takanoi (brush-clawed shore crab)
- Hemimysis anomala (bloody-red mysid)
- imnomysis benedeni (Donau-Schwebgarnele)
- Limnoria lignorum (gribble)
- Orconectes limosus (spiny-cheek crayfish)
- Orconectes virilis (virile crayfish)
- Pacifastacus leniusculus (signal crayfish)
- Palaemon elegans (rockpool shrimp)
- Paralithodes camtschaticus (red king crab)
- Percnon gibbesi (Sally Lightfoot crab)
- Pontogammarus robustoides
- Procambarus clarkii (Louisiana crawfish)
- Macrobrachium dayanum
- Neocaridina davidi (cherry shrimp)
- Macrobrachium nipponense (oriental river prawn)
- Palaemon macrodactylus

==== Insects ====
- Adelges piceae (balsam woolly adelgid)
- Aedes albopictus (tiger mosquito)
- Agrilus planipennis (emerald ash borer)
- Aleurodicus dispersus (spiralling whitefly)
- Aphis spiraecola (green citrus aphid)
- Aproceros leucopoda (elm zigzag sawfly)
- Aromia bungii (red necked longicorn)
- Bemisia tabaci (silverleaf whitefly)
- Cacyreus marshalli (geranium bronze)
- Cameraria ohridella (horse-chestnut leaf miner)
- Ceratitis capitata (Mediterranean fruit fly)
- Chilo suppressalis (striped rice stem borer)
- Cinara cupressi (cypress aphid)
- Corythucha ciliata (sycamore lace bug)
- Cryptotermes brevis (West Indian drywood termite)
- Ctenarytaina eucalypti (blue gum psyllid)
- Cydalima perspectalis (box tree moth)
- Dendroctonus micans (great spruce bark beetle)
- Diabrotica virgifera (western corn rootworm)
- Dreyfusia nordmannianae (silver fir adelges)
- Drosophila suzukii (spotted wing drosophila)
- Dryocosmus kuriphilus (chestnut gall wasp)
- Epiphyas postvittana (light brown apple moth)
- Frankliniella occidentalis (western flower thrips)
- Gilpinia hercyniae (European spruce sawfly)
- Halyomorpha halys (marmorated stink bug)
- Harmonia axyridis (Asian lady beetle)
- Hypogeococcus pungens (cactus mealybug)
- Icerya purchasi (cottony cushion scale)
- Lasius neglectus (invasive garden ant)
- Leptinotarsa decemlineata (Colorado beetle)
- Leptocybe invasa (blue gum chalcid)
- Lilioceris lilii (scarlet lily beetle)
- Linepithema humile (Argentine ant)
- Lysiphlebus testaceipes
- Megastigmus spermotrophus (Douglas-fir seed chalcid)
- Opogona sacchari (banana moth)
- Monomorium pharaonis (pharaoh ant)
- Paratrechina longicornis (longhorn crazy ant)
- Paysandisia archon (castniid palm borer)
- Pheidole megacephala (big-headed ant)
- Phoracantha semipunctata (Australian eucalyptus longhorn)
- Phyllonorycter issikii (lime leaf miner)
- Rhagoletis cingulata (eastern cherry fruit fly)
- Scaphoideus titanus (American grapevine leafhopper)
- Solenopsis invicta (red imported fire ant)
- Simacauda dicommatias
- Takahashia japonica (string cottony scale)
- Thaumastocoris peregrinus (bronze bug)
- Trialeurodes ricini (castor bean whitefly)
- Vespa velutina nigrithorax (yellow-legged Asian hornet)
- Vespula germanica (European wasp)
- Vespula vulgaris (common wasp)
- Xyleborus perforans (island pinhole borer)
- Xylosandrus germanus (black timber bark beetle)

=== Chordates ===
==== Ascidians ====
- Microcosmus squamiger
- Polyandrocarpa zorritensis
- Styela clava (stalked sea squirt)

==== Amphibians ====
- Lithobates catesbeianus (American bullfrog)
- Xenopus laevis (African clawed frog)
- Mesotriton alpestris (alpine newt)

==== Birds ====
- Acridotheres tristis (common myna)
- Alopochen aegyptiacus (Egyptian goose)
- Amandava amandava (red avadavat)
- Branta canadensis (Canada goose)
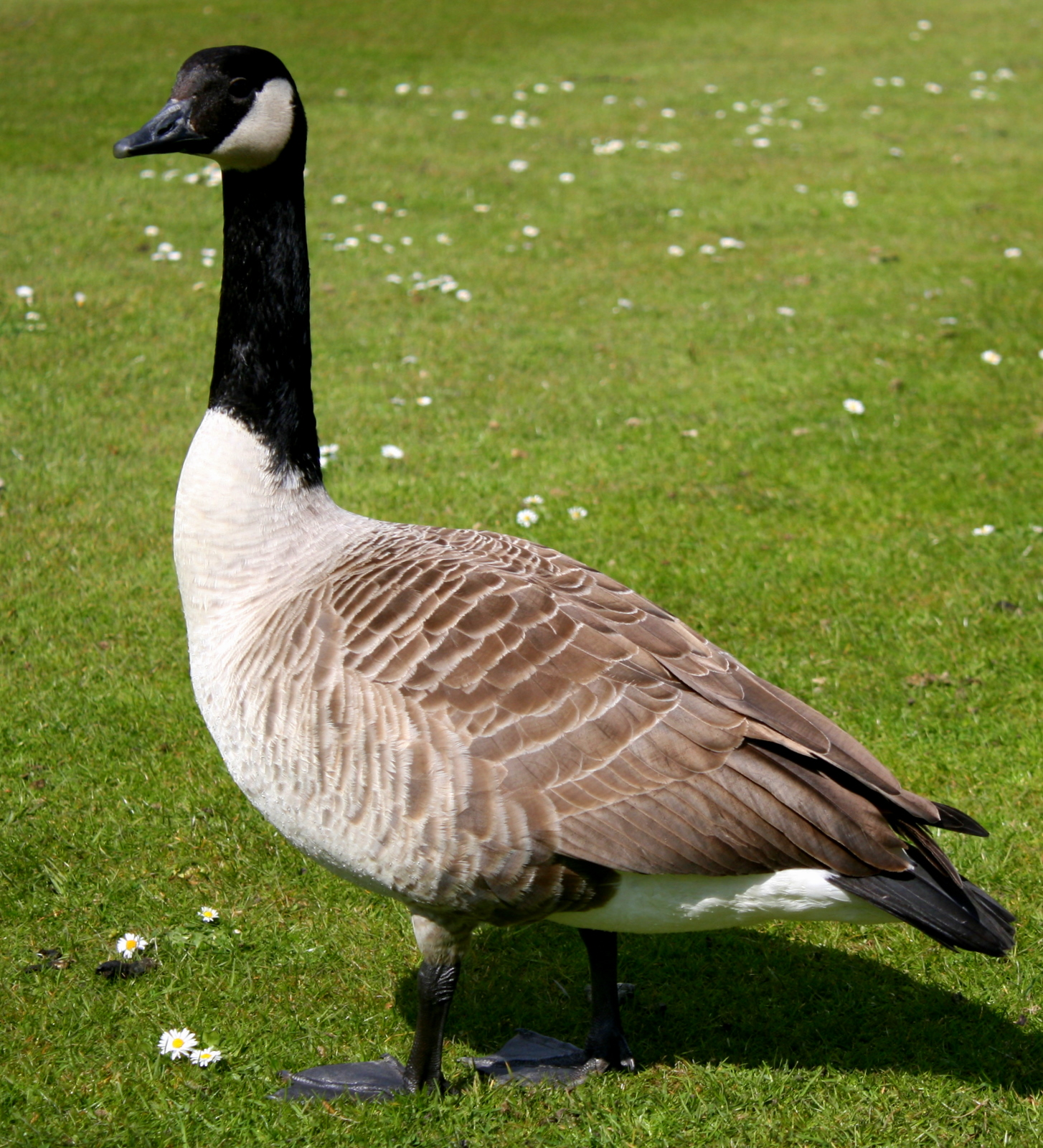
  A Canada goose in Cambridge, England
- Corvus splendens (house crow)
- Estrilda astrild (common waxbill)
- Estrilda troglodytes (black-rumped waxbill)
- Euodice cantans (African silverbill)
- Euplectes afer (yellow-crowned bishop)
- Leiothrix lutea (red-billed leiothrix)
- Myiopsitta monachus (monk parakeet)
- Oxyura jamaicensis (ruddy duck)
- Phasianus colchicus (common pheasant)
- Ploceus cucullatus (village weaver)
- Ploceus melanocephalus (black-headed weaver)
- Psittacula krameri (rose-ringed parakeet)
- Threskiornis aethiopicus (African sacred ibis)

==== Fish ====
- Alburnus alburnus (common bleak)
- Ameiurus melas (black bullhead (catfish))
- Australoheros facetus (chameleon cichlid)
- Carassius auratus (goldfish)
- Carassius gibelio (Prussian carp)
- Cyprinus carpio (common carp)
- Esox lucius (northern pike)
- Fundulus heteroclitus (mummichog)
- Gambusia holbrooki (eastern mosquitofish)
- Hypophthalmichthys nobilis (bighead carp)
- Lepomis gibbosus (pumpkinseed sunfish)
- Leuciscus leuciscus (common dace)
- Micropterus salmoides (largemouth bass)
- Neogobius fluviatilis (monkey goby)
- Neogobius melanostomus (round goby)
- Oncorhynchus mykiss (rainbow trout)
- Perccottus glenii (Chinese sleeper)
- Pseudorasbora parva (stone moroko)
- Rutilus rutilus (common roach)
- Sander lucioperca
- Poecilia reticulata (guppy)
- Pterygoplichthys pardalis (Amazon sailfin catfish)
- Pterygoplichthys disjunctivus (vermiculated sailfin catfish)
- Ancistrus dolichopterus (bushymouth catfish )
- Clarias gariepinus (African sharptooth catfish)
- Oreochromis niloticus (Nile tilapia)
- Amatitlania nigrofasciata (convict cichlid)
- Pelmatolapia mariae (spotted tilapia)
- Maylandia aurora
- Thorichthys meeki (firemouth cichlid)
- Andinoacara rivulatus (green terror)
- Rocio octofasciata (Jack Dempsey)
- Hypostomus plecostomus (common pleco)
- Silurus glanis (wels catfish)
- Gambusia affinis (western mosquitofish)
- Gambusia holbrooki (eastern mosquitofish)
- Barbus barbus (common barbel)
- Abramis brama (common bream)
- Xiphophorus hellerii (green swordtail)
- Hemichromis lifalili (blood-red jewel cichlid)
- Oreochromis mossambicus (Mozambique tilapia)

==== Mammals ====
- Ammotragus lervia (Barbary sheep)
- Axis axis (chital)
- Callosciurus erythraeus (Pallas' squirrel)
- Callosciurus finlaysonii (Finlayson's squirrel)
- Capra hircus (feral goat)
- Castor canadensis (North American beaver)
- Cervus nippon (sika deer)
- Equus asinus (donkey)
- Muntiacus reevesi (Reeves's muntjac)
- Mustela furo (ferret)
- Myocastor coypus (coypu, nutria)
- Neogale vison (American mink)
- Nyctereutes procyonoides (raccoon dog)
- Ondatra zibethicus (muskrat)
- Procyon lotor (common raccoon)
- Rattus rattus (black rat)
- Sciurus carolinensis (grey squirrel)
- Tamias sibiricus (Siberian chipmunk)
- Urva auropunctata (small Indian mongoose)

==== Reptiles ====
- Chamaeleo chamaeleon (common chameleon)
- Trachemys scripta elegans (red-eared slider)
- Pelodiscus sinensis (Chinese softshell turtle)
- Lampropeltis californiae (California kingsnake)
- Chelydra serpentina (snapping turtle)
- Hemorrhois hippocrepis (horseshoe whip snake)
- Zamenis longissimus (Aesculapian snake)
- Podarcis siculus (ruin lizard)
- Podarcis muralis (common wall lizard)
- Hemidactylus turcicus ( Mediterranean house gecko)
- Tarentola mauritanica (common wall gecko)

=== Molluscs ===
- Arion vulgaris (Spanish slug)
- Deroceras invadens (tramp slug)

==== Marine ====
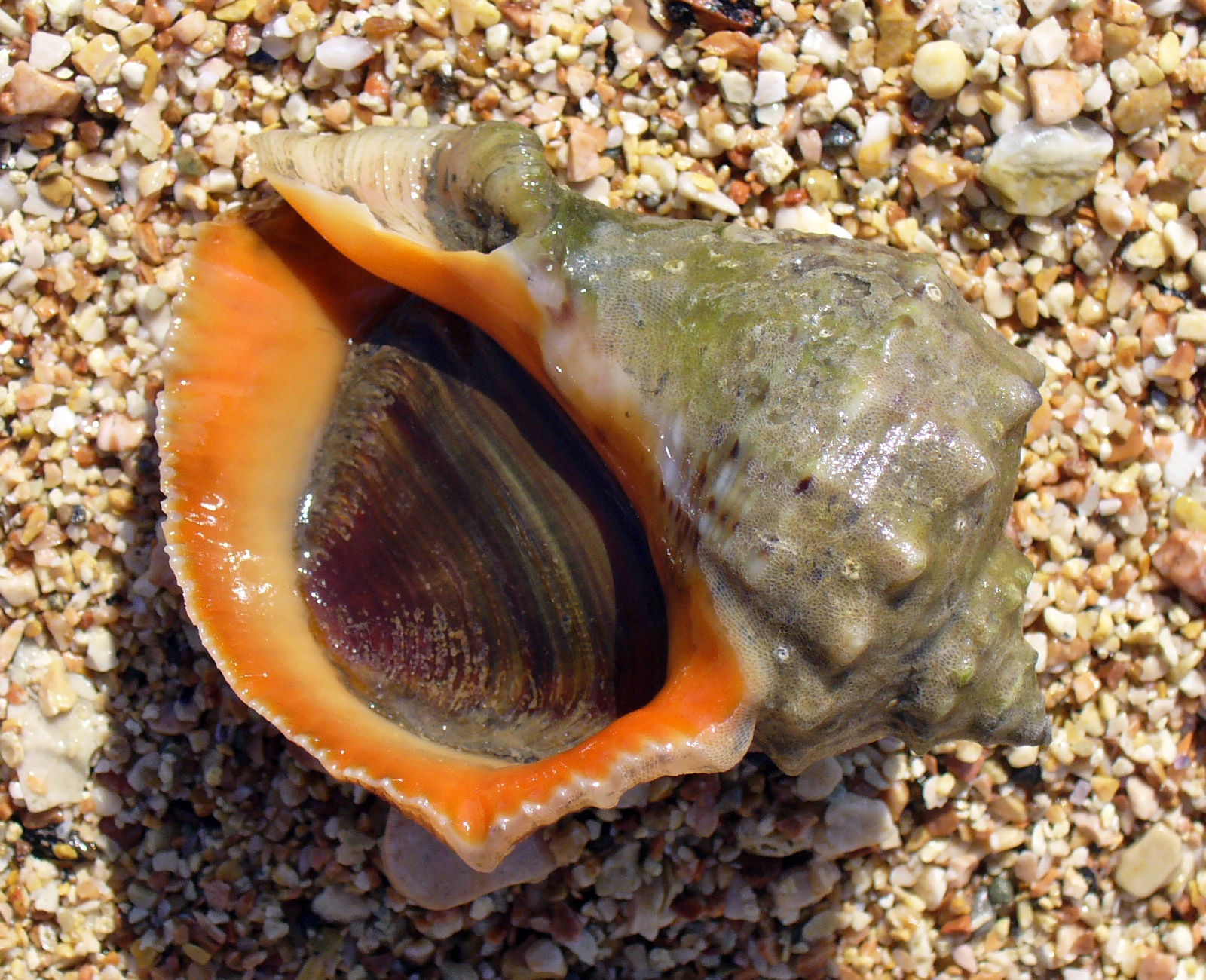
The veined rapa whelk, Rapana venosa

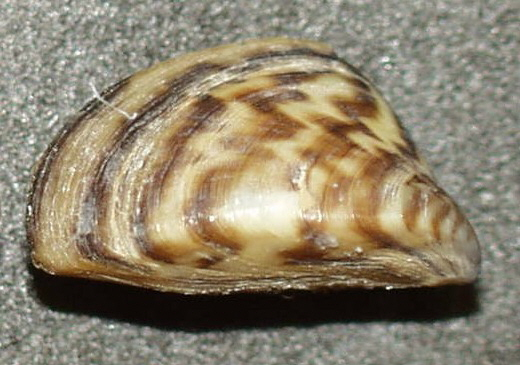
A shell of the zebra mussel, Dreissena polymorpha

- Arcuatula senhousia (Asian date mussel)
- Brachidontes pharaonis (variable mussel)
- Crassostrea gigas (Pacific oyster)
- Crepidula fornicata (common slipper shell)
- Ensis directus (American jack-knife clam)
- Petricolaria pholadiformis (false angel wing)
- Pinctada radiata (Atlantic pearl-oyster)
- Rapana venosa (veined rapa whelk)

==== Freshwater ====
- Corbicula fluminalis
- Corbicula fluminea (freshwater bivalve mollusk)
- Dreissena polymorpha (zebra mussel)
- Dreissena rostriformis bugensis (quagga mussel)
- Potamopyrgus antipodarum (New Zealand mud snail)
- Sinanodonta woodiana (Chinese pond mussel)
- Melanoides granifera (quilted melania)
- Melanoides tuberculata (red-rimmed melania)
- Pomacea maculata (island apple snail)
- Pomacea canaliculata (golden apple snail)

=== Annelids ===
- Ficopomatus enigmaticus (Australian tubeworm)
- Lumbricus terrestris (common earthworm)
- Marenzelleria neglecta (red-gilled mud worm)

=== Nematodes ===
- Anguillicoloides crassus (swim bladder worm)
- Globodera rostochiensis (yellow potato cyst nematode)

=== Platyhelminthes ===
- Arthurdendyus triangulatus (New Zealand flatworm)
- Australoplana sanguinea (Australian flatworm)
- Bothriocephalus acheilognathi (Asian tapeworm)

== Fungi ==
- Clathrus archeri (Berk.) Dring
- Hymenoscyphus fraxineus (T. Kowalski) Baral, Queloz, Hosoya (ash dieback disease)
- Ophiostoma ulmi (Dutch elm disease)

== European priorities ==
Different initiatives have been promoted in order to prioritize species among this long (and ongoing) list. Some examples are:

- Roy, David; et al. (2020). "100 of the worst invasive species of Europe". europe-aliens.org. Delivering Alien Invasive Species Inventories for Europe (DAISIE). doi:10.15468/ybwd3x. Archived from the original on 15 April 2019.
- List of invasive alien species of Union concern — official list pursuant to Article 12(1) of EU Regulation 1143 / 2014 on Invasive Alien Species
