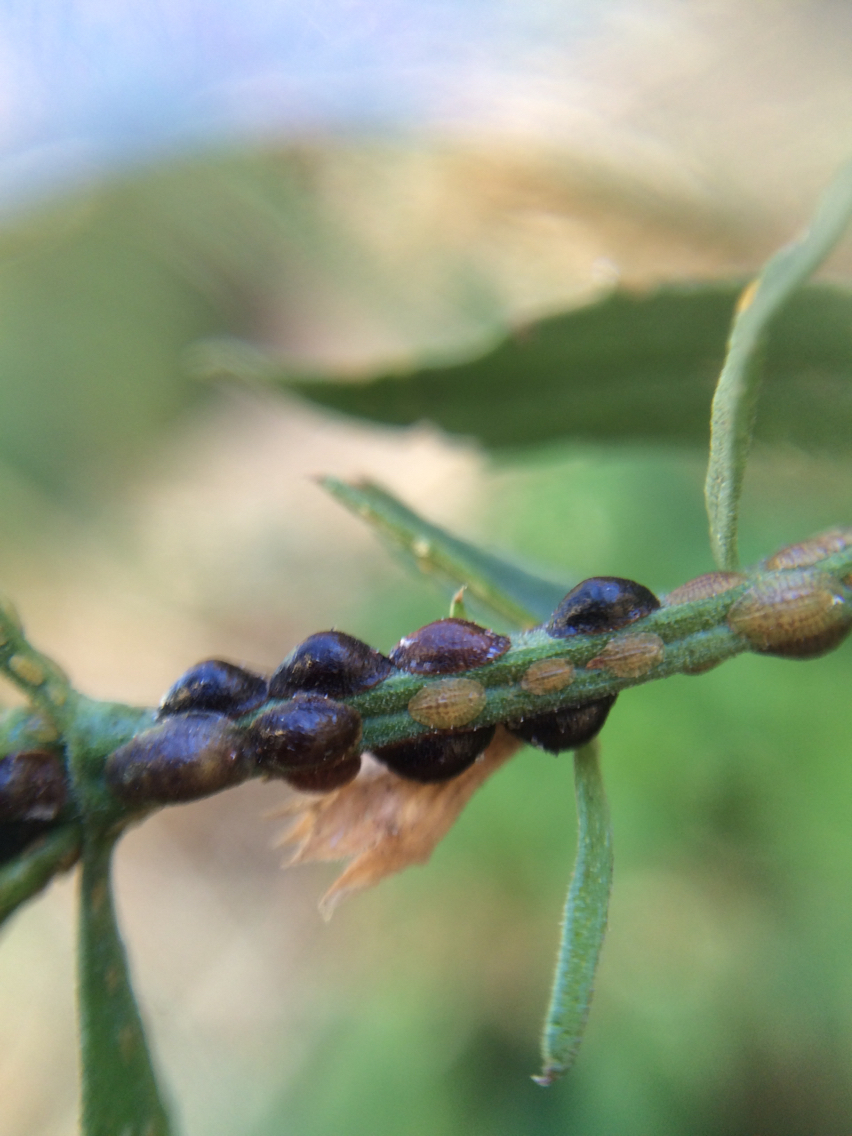

Scientific classification
- Domain: Eukaryota
- Kingdom: Animalia
- Phylum: Arthropoda
- Class: Insecta
- Order: Hemiptera
- Suborder: Sternorrhyncha
- Family: Coccidae
- Genus: Parasaissetia
- Species: P. nigra

Binomial name
- Parasaissetia nigra (Nietner, 1861)

= Parasaissetia nigra =

Species of true bug

Parasaissetia nigra is a species of soft scale insect in the family Coccidae.
