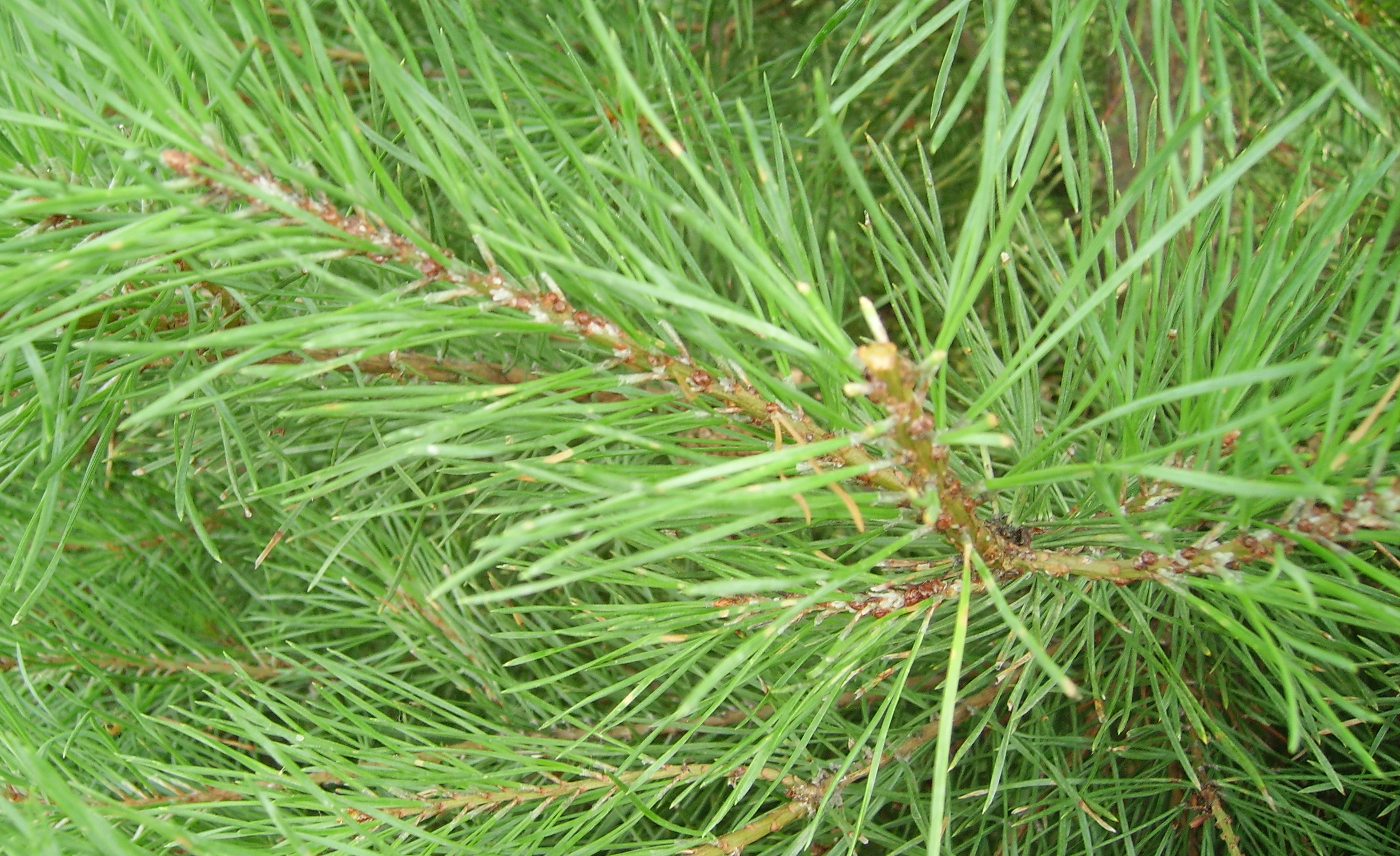

Scientific classification
- Kingdom: Animalia
- Phylum: Arthropoda
- Class: Insecta
- Order: Hemiptera
- Suborder: Sternorrhyncha
- Family: Coccidae
- Genus: Toumeyella
- Species: T. parvicornis

Binomial name
- Toumeyella parvicornis (Cockerell, 1897)

= Toumeyella parvicornis =

Species of true bug

Toumeyella parvicornis is a soft scale insect in the family Coccidae with a wide host range. It is commonly known as pine tortoise scale because of the characteristic appearance of the mature females, which look like tiny tortoises 4–5mm long.

== Description ==
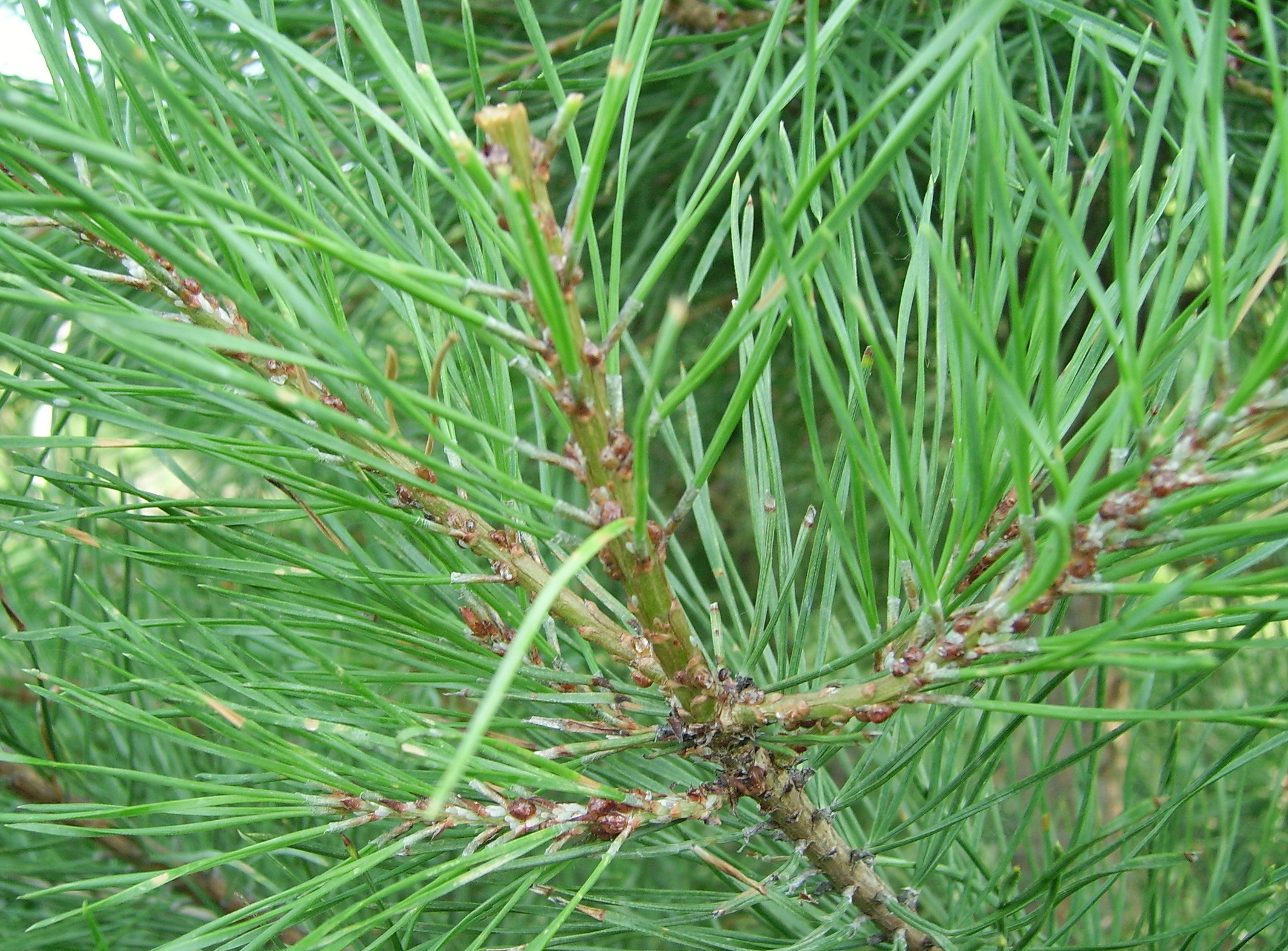

The adult scale insect is a glossy reddish brown colour. It has an oval dome shape and is about three millimetres in width. The front end is rounded while the rear end has a distinctive groove. Adults retain their legs and antennae but mostly remain sedentary. The nymphs are a flattish oval shape, yellowish green, with six short legs. The nymphs shed their skin three times and each instar is larger and more convex than the previous one.

== Biology ==
Males have not been recorded for this species so the populations are composed entirely of females. A mature female lays whitish oval eggs and keeps them underneath her body to protect them. She usually chooses the underside of a leaf and adult scales may often be seen in a line on both sides of the midrib and beside the lateral veins. Eggs hatch in anything between a few minutes and a few hours. The newly hatched crawlers wander off to find somewhere suitable to settle on a leaf or near the tip of a green shoot. Both nymphs and adults suck sap from the phloem of the host plant. When a large number of scale insects are present, their collective feeding causes a yellowing of the leaves which may later fall, a loss of plant vigour and a reduction in crop yield. The scale insects excrete honeydew on which bees, wasps, ants and other insects feed. Sooty mould fungus often grows on the honeydew and this decreases the area of leaf available for photosynthesis, spoils the appearance of the plant and reduces the marketability of fruit. It is especially damaging to young trees after transplanting.

== Hosts ==
This scale is of North American origin. In 2021 it became a serious invasive species in Italy, doing much damage to the pines of Rome (Pinus pinea).

== Ants ==
This scale is often associated with ants which feed on the honeydew excreted and defend the insects from attack by predators such as lady beetles.
