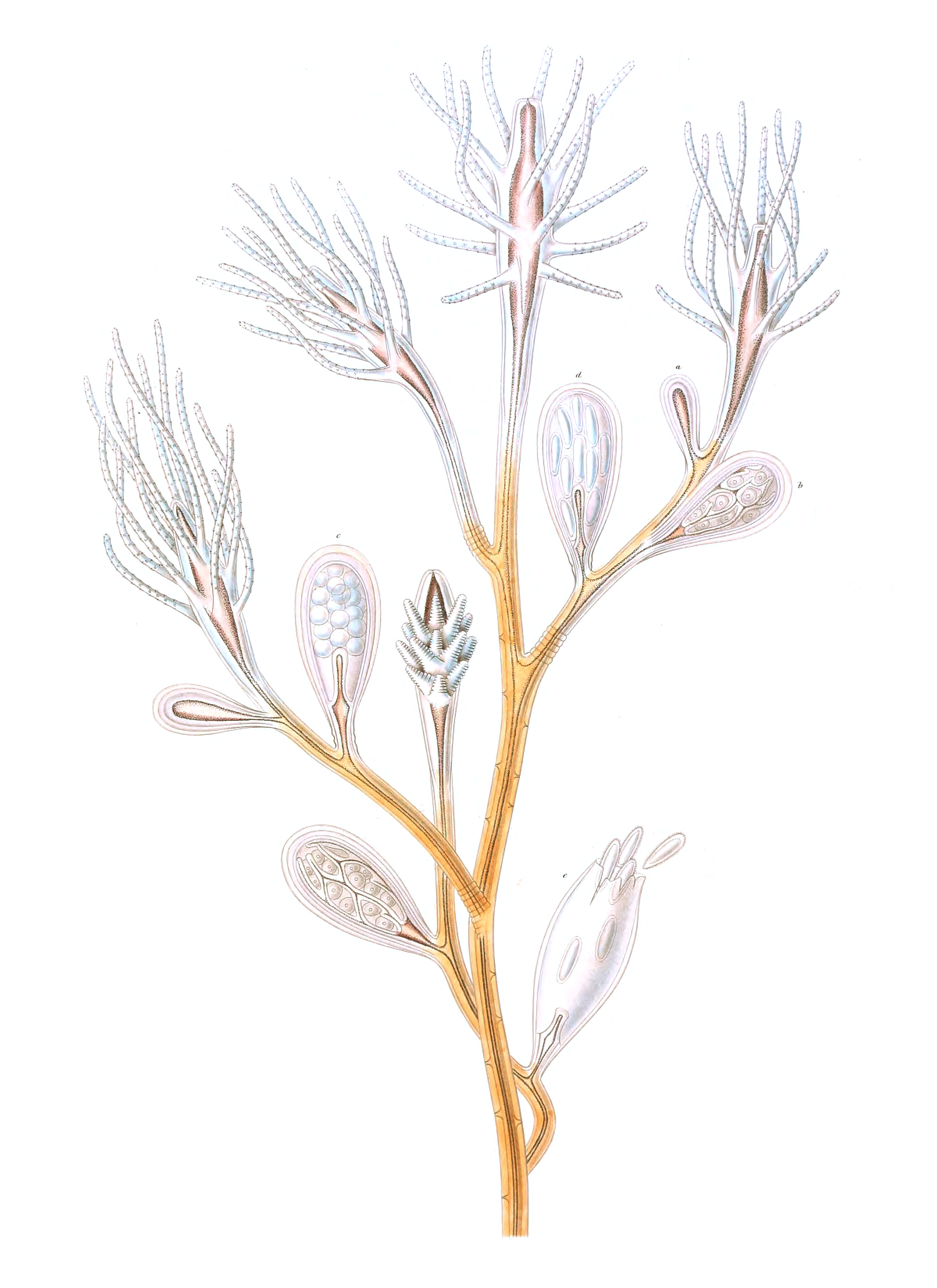

Scientific classification
- Kingdom: Animalia
- Phylum: Cnidaria
- Class: Hydrozoa
- Order: Anthoathecata
- Suborder: Filifera
- Family: Cordylophoridae von Lendenfeld, 1885
- Genus: Cordylophora; Allman, 1844

= Cordylophora =

Genus of hydrozoans

Cordylophora is the sole genus of hydrozoans in the monotypic family Cordylophoridae.

== Species ==
The World Register of Marine Species includes the following species in the genus :

- Cordylophora caspia (Pallas, 1771)
- Cordylophora solangiae Redier, 1967
