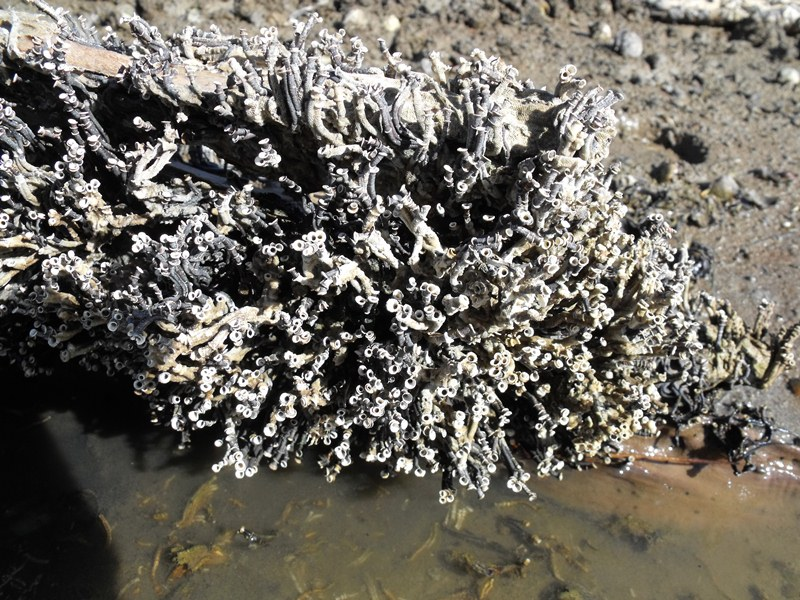
- Ficopomatus enigmaticus

Scientific classification
- Domain: Eukaryota
- Kingdom: Animalia
- Phylum: Annelida
- Clade: Pleistoannelida
- Clade: Sedentaria
- Order: Sabellida
- Family: Serpulidae
- Subfamily: Ficopomatinae
- Genus: Ficopomatus; Southern, 1921

= Ficopomatus =

Genus of annelids

Ficopomatus is a genus of annelids belonging to the family Serpulidae.

The genus has cosmopolitan distribution.

Species:

- Ficopomatus enigmaticus (Fauvel, 1923)
- Ficopomatus macrodon Southern, 1921
- Ficopomatus miamiensis (Treadwell, 1934)
- Ficopomatus shenzhensis Li, Wang & Deng, 2012
- Ficopomatus talehsapensis Pillai, 2008
- Ficopomatus uschakovi (Pillai, 1960)
