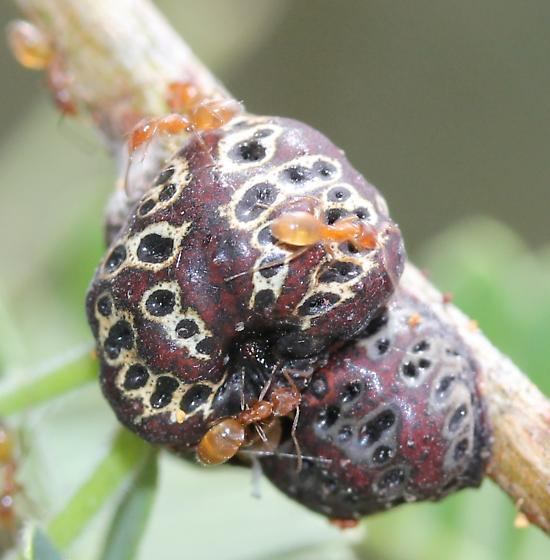
- The scale insect Toumeyella mirabilis with protective ants.

Scientific classification
- Domain: Eukaryota
- Kingdom: Animalia
- Phylum: Arthropoda
- Class: Insecta
- Order: Hemiptera
- Suborder: Sternorrhyncha
- Family: Coccidae
- Subfamily: Myzolecaniinae
- Genus: Toumeyella; Cockerell, 1895

= Toumeyella =

Genus of true bugs

Toumeyella is a genus of tortoise scales in the subfamily Myzolecaniinae of the true bug family Coccidae.

== Species ==
Species recognized as of August 2021:

- Toumeyella cerifera Ferris, 1921
- Toumeyella coffeae Kondo, 2013
- Toumeyella crataegi Kondo & González, 2018
- Toumeyella cubensis Heidel & Köhler, 1979
- Toumeyella erythrinae Kondo & Williams, 2003
- Toumeyella fontanai Kondo & Pellizzari, 2011
- Toumeyella lignumvitae Williams, 1993
- Toumeyella liriodendri (Gmelin, 1790)
- Toumeyella lomagundiae Hall, 1935
- Toumeyella martinezi Kondo & González, 2014
- Toumeyella mirabilis (Cockerell, 1895)
- Toumeyella nectandrae Hempel, 1929
- Toumeyella obunca De Lotto, 1966
- Toumeyella parvicornis (Cockerell, 1897)
- Toumeyella paulista Hempel, 1932
- Toumeyella pini (King, 1901)
- Toumeyella pinicola Ferris, 1920
- Toumeyella quadrifasciata (Cockerell, 1895)
- Toumeyella sonorensis (Cockerell & Parrott, 1899)
- Toumeyella turgida (Cockerell, 1897)
- Toumeyella virginiana Williams & Kosztarab, 1972
