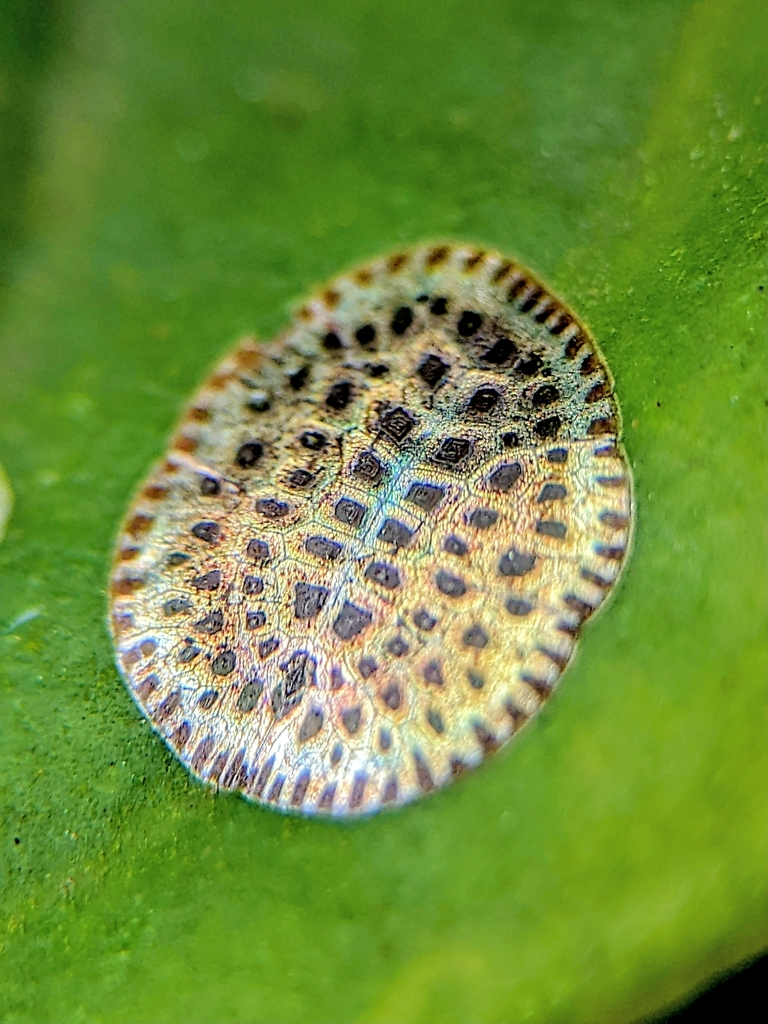
- Paralecanium sp. on leaf, Upper Seletar Reservoir Park, Singapore

Scientific classification
- Kingdom: Animalia
- Phylum: Arthropoda
- Clade: Pancrustacea
- Class: Insecta
- Order: Hemiptera
- Suborder: Sternorrhyncha
- Family: Coccidae
- Subfamily: Coccinae
- Tribe: Paralecaniini
- Genus: Paralecanium; Cockerell in Cockerell & Parrott, 1899

Type species
- Lecanium frenchii Maskell

Synonyms
- Podoparalecanium Tao & Wong, 1983

= Paralecanium =

Genus of soft scale insects

Paralecanium is a genus of soft scale insects in the family Coccidae and tribe Paralecaniini. The genus was established by Cockerell in Cockerell & Parrott in 1899, with Lecanium frenchii Maskell designated as the type species. A major revision published in 2018 redefined the genus, and a further species, Paralecanium sabia, was described from China in 2024.

== Description ==
Members of Paralecanium are soft scale insects whose adult females are flat, soft-bodied, and largely sessile, covered by a thin, glassy wax test that becomes sclerotised at maturity. The genus is characterised within the Paralecaniini by fan-shaped marginal setae along the body edge, a feature shared with the related genera Discochiton and Insularicoccus.

Paralecanium can be distinguished from these related genera by the following combination of characters:

- Preopercular pores are absent (present in both Discochiton and Insularicoccus)
- Stigmatic rays are absent (present in Discochiton)
- Three marginal radial lines are present on each side between the stigmatic clefts (five in Discochiton)

Legs are always present and five-segmented, though in some species they are reduced in size.

== Taxonomy ==
=== Taxonomic history ===
Cockerell introduced the genus in Cockerell & Parrott (1899) to accommodate soft scale species with fan-like marginal setae. Many species were added over the following decades, mostly described in the first half of the twentieth century.

A major revision published in 2018 redefined the genus. Prior to this, the genus had never been comprehensively revised. At the start of the revision, 34 species or subspecies were included. In the revision, many former species were transferred to the new genus Discochiton and Insularicoccus. A further species, Paralecanium sabia, was described from China in 2024, bringing the total number of accepted species to 28.

A 2018 review of the Coccidae of Laos recorded the species under the older combination Paralecanium expansum; under the revised taxonomy of Hodgson and Williams (2018), that species is treated as Discochiton expansum.

=== Species ===
Following the 2018 revision and the description of Paralecanium sabia in 2024, 28 species are currently recognised in the genus:

- Paralecanium acinaces Hodgson, 2018
- Paralecanium busoense Hodgson, 2018
- Paralecanium calophylli (Green, 1896)
- Paralecanium claviseta Hodgson, 2018
- Paralecanium comperei Hodgson, 2018
- Paralecanium cypripedium Hodgson, 2018
- Paralecanium elongatum Hodgson, 2018
- Paralecanium frenchii (Maskell, 1899)
- Paralecanium geometricum (Green, 1896)
- Paralecanium hainanense (Takahashi, 1942)
- Paralecanium leei Hodgson, 2018
- Paralecanium machili (Takahashi, 1939)
- Paralecanium macrozamiae (Fuller, 1899)
- Paralecanium maculatum (Takahashi, 1939)
- Paralecanium marginatum (Green, 1896)
- Paralecanium maritimum (Green, 1896)
- Paralecanium minutum (Takahashi, 1939)
- Paralecanium morobeense Hodgson, 2018
- Paralecanium neoguineense Hodgson, 2018
- Paralecanium neomaritimum (Takahashi, 1942)
- Paralecanium ovatum (Morrison, 1928)
- Paralecanium pahanense (Takahashi, 1950)
- Paralecanium palawanense Hodgson, 2018
- Paralecanium peradeniyense (Green, 1896)
- Paralecanium planum (Green, 1896)
- Paralecanium sabia Tan, Meng & Xing, 2024
- Paralecanium vacerra Hodgson, 2018
- Paralecanium zonatum (Green, 1896)

Podoparalecanium Tao & Wong, 1983, was later treated as a junior synonym of Paralecanium.

== Distribution and host plants ==
Species of Paralecanium are recorded mainly from southern and eastern Asia and Australasia. In the 2018 revision, species retained in the genus were recorded from Australia, China, Indonesia, Malaysia, Papua New Guinea, the Philippines, Singapore, Sri Lanka and Taiwan.

Species of the genus occur on a wide range of host plants. Host families recorded in the revision include Proteaceae, Pandanaceae, Rubiaceae, Piperaceae, Orchidaceae, Lauraceae, Myrtaceae, Myrsinaceae and Zamiaceae.

== Ecology ==
Species of Paralecanium are flat-bodied soft scales usually found on the upper surfaces of leaves, with the venter strongly adpressed to the host. Individuals that settle close to a leaf vein may become markedly asymmetrical, especially on the ventral side.

Little information is available on the natural enemies of the genus. Vesey-Fitzgerald (1953) reported that introduced coccinellid predators in the Seychelles did not attack Paralecanium species there, although parasitoid exit holes were observed. Hodgson and Williams suggested that the overlapping fan-shaped marginal setae may help prevent predator access to the ventral surface.

== Life stages ==
The 2018 revision described the first-instar nymph, second/third-instar female, and second-instar male of Paralecanium leei as representative immature stages for the genus. In these immature stages, the fan-shaped marginal setae of adult females are not yet developed. First-instar nymphs have finely spinose marginal setae, six-segmented antennae, and well-developed legs. In second- and third-instar females, the marginal setae remain spinose rather than fan-shaped, while second-instar males are characterised by two sizes of dorsal tubular ducts. Hodgson and Williams also noted that nymphs of Paralecanium tend to be smaller than comparable stages in Discochiton.
