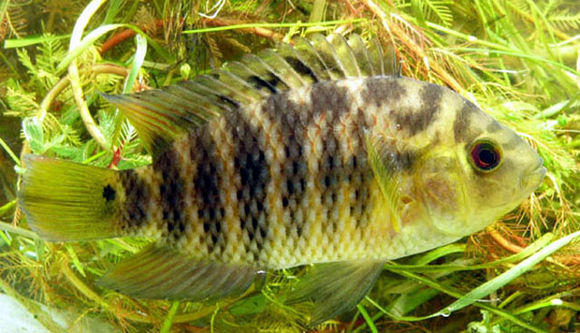
- Australoheros facetus

Scientific classification
- Kingdom: Animalia
- Phylum: Chordata
- Class: Actinopterygii
- Division: Teleostei
- Order: Cichliformes
- Family: Cichlidae
- Tribe: Heroini
- Genus: Australoheros; Říčan & S. O. Kullander, 2006

Type species
- Chromis facetus Jenyns, 1842

= Australoheros =

Genus of fishes

Australoheros is a fish genus in the cichlid family. Most are restricted to rivers and streams in southeastern Brazil, Paraguay, Uruguay and northeastern Argentina, but at least one species is also found in lakes and swamps. This genus was erected after a taxonomic revision in 2006. These are relatively small cichlids that typically do not surpass 10–15 centimetres (4–6 in) in length, although A. facetus reaches about 20 cm (8 in).

== Species ==
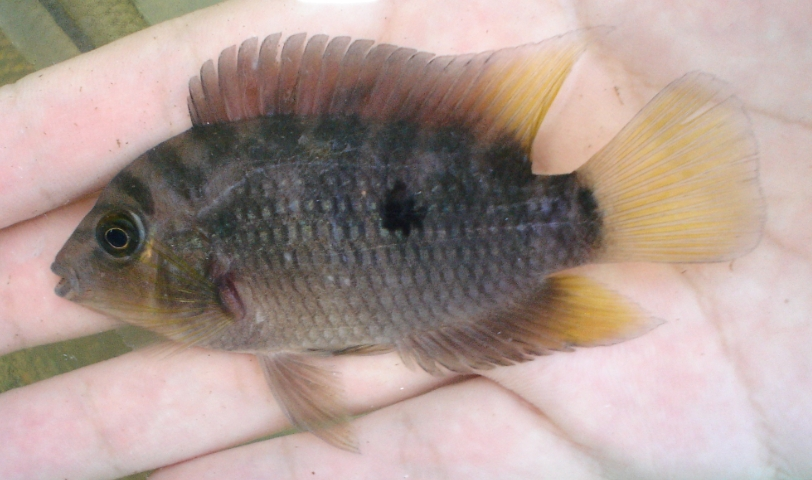
Australoheros scitulus

Four of these species were formerly included in Cichlasoma, but the rest were all described in 2006 (when the genus Australoheros was coined) or later, and placed in the correct genus from the beginning. There are currently 29 recognized species in this genus:

- Australoheros acaroides (R. F. Hensel, 1870)
- Australoheros angiru Říčan, Piáleck, Almirón & Casciotta, 2011
- Australoheros autrani Ottoni & W. J. E. M. Costa, 2008
- Australoheros autochthon (Günther, 1862)
- Australoheros barbosae Ottoni & W. J. E. M. Costa, 2008
- Australoheros capixaba Ottoni, 2010
- Australoheros charrua Říčan & S. O. Kullander, 2008
- Australoheros facetus (Jenyns, 1842) (Chameleon cichlid)
- Australoheros forquilha Říčan & S. O. Kullander, 2008
- Australoheros guarani Říčan & S. O. Kullander, 2008
- Australoheros ipatinguensis Ottoni & W. J. E. M. Costa, 2008
- Australoheros kaaygua Casciotta, Almirón & Gómez, 2006
- Australoheros macacuensis Ottoni & W. J. E. M. Costa, 2008
- Australoheros macaensis Ottoni & W. J. E. M. Costa, 2008
- Australoheros mattosi Ottoni, 2012
- Australoheros minuano Říčan & S. O. Kullander, 2008
- Australoheros montanus Ottoni, 2012
- Australoheros muriae Ottoni & W. J. E. M. Costa, 2008
- Australoheros paraibae Ottoni & W. J. E. M. Costa, 2008
- Australoheros perdi Ottoni, Lezama, Triques, Fragoso-Moura, C. C. T. Lucas & F. A. R. Barbosa, 2011
- Australoheros ribeirae Ottoni, Oyakawa & W. J. E. M. Costa, 2008
- Australoheros robustus Ottoni & W. J. E. M. Costa, 2008
- Australoheros sanguineus Ottoni, 2013
- Australoheros saquarema Ottoni & W. J. E. M. Costa, 2008
- Australoheros scitulus (Říčan & S. O. Kullander, 2003)
- Australoheros taura Ottoni & Cheffe, 2009
- Australoheros tavaresi Ottoni, 2012
- Australoheros tembe (Casciotta, Gómez & Toresanni, 1995)
- Australoheros ykeregua Říčan, Piáleck, Almirón & Casciotta, 2011
