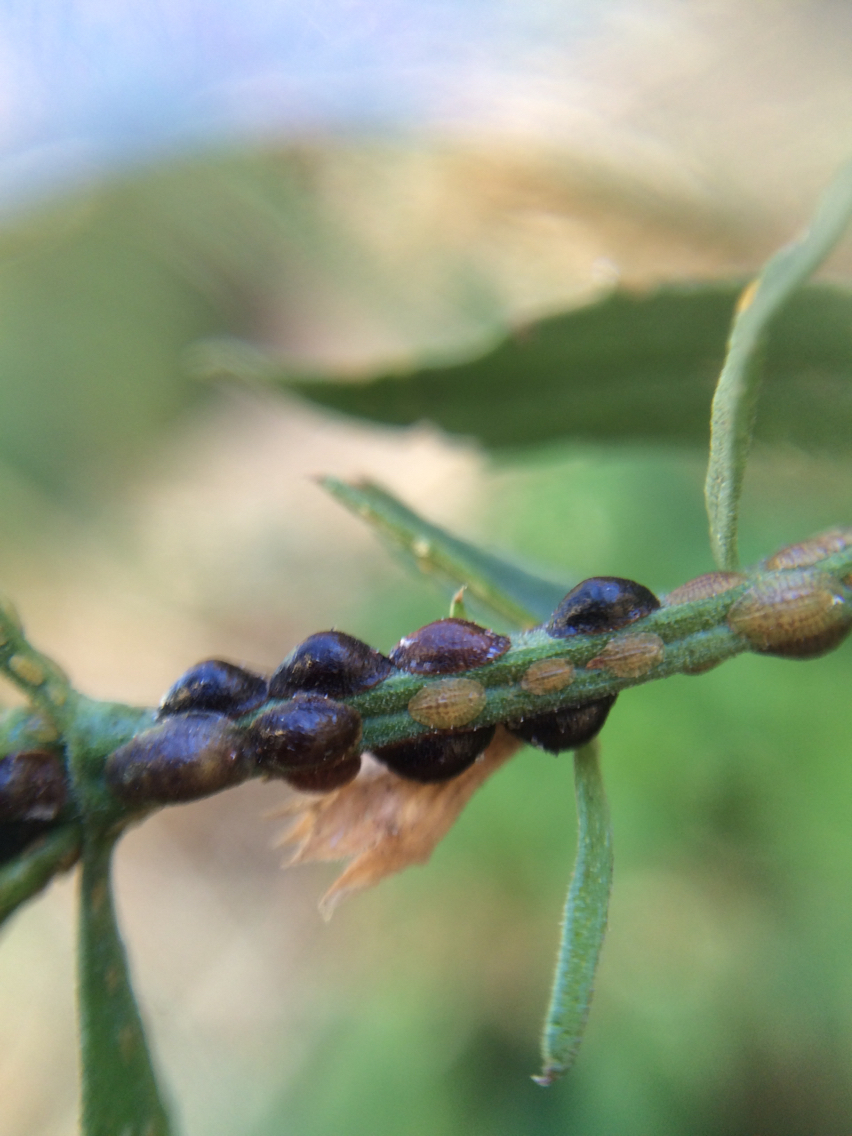
- P. nigra

Scientific classification
- Domain: Eukaryota
- Kingdom: Animalia
- Phylum: Arthropoda
- Class: Insecta
- Order: Hemiptera
- Suborder: Sternorrhyncha
- Family: Coccidae
- Genus: Parasaissetia

= Parasaissetia =

Genus of true bugs

Parasaissetia is a genus of scales and mealybugs in the family Coccidae. There are about five described species in Parasaissetia.

== Species ==
- Parasaissetia ficicola De Lotto, 1965
- Parasaissetia litorea De Lotto, 1967
- Parasaissetia nairobica (De Lotto, 1957)
- Parasaissetia nigra (Nietner, 1861)
- Parasaissetia tsaratananae (Mamet, 1951)
