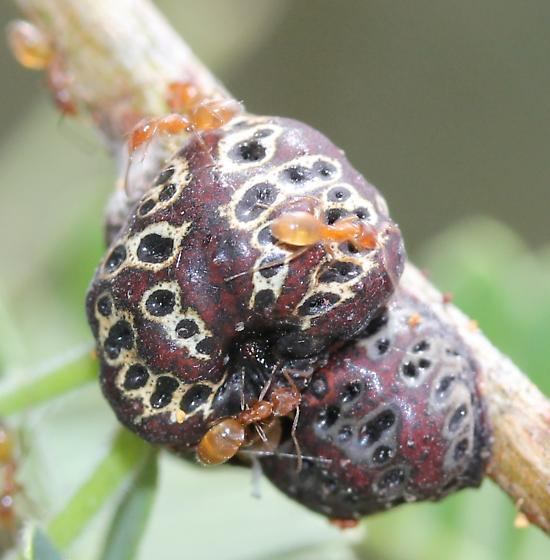
- The scale insect Toumeyella mirabilis with protective ants.

Scientific classification
- Kingdom: Animalia
- Phylum: Arthropoda
- Class: Insecta
- Order: Hemiptera
- Suborder: Sternorrhyncha
- Family: Coccidae
- Subfamily: Myzolecaniinae

= Myzolecaniinae =

Family of true bugs

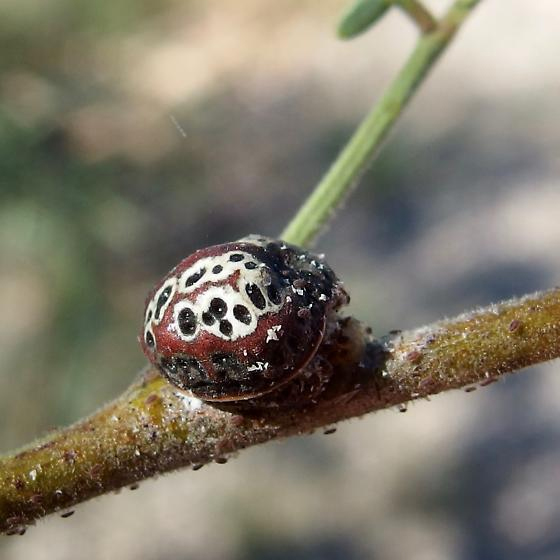
The scale insect Toumeyella mirabilis on Prosopis velutina (mesquite).

The Myzolecaniinae are a subfamily of scale insects belonging to the family Coccidae. They are commonly known as soft scales, wax scales or tortoise scales. The females are flat with elongated oval bodies and a smooth integument which may be covered with wax. In some genera they possess legs but in others, they do not, and the antennae may be shortened or missing. The males may be winged or wingless.

== Genera ==
There are 17 genera worldwide.

- Akermes
- Alecanium
- Alecanopsis
- Bombacoccus
- Cribolecanium
- Cryptostigma
- Cyclolecanium
- Halococcus
- Houardia
- Megasaissetia
- Myzolecanium
- Neolecanium
- Paractenochiton
- Pseudophilippia
- Richardiella
- Torarchus
- Toumeyella
- Xenolecanium
