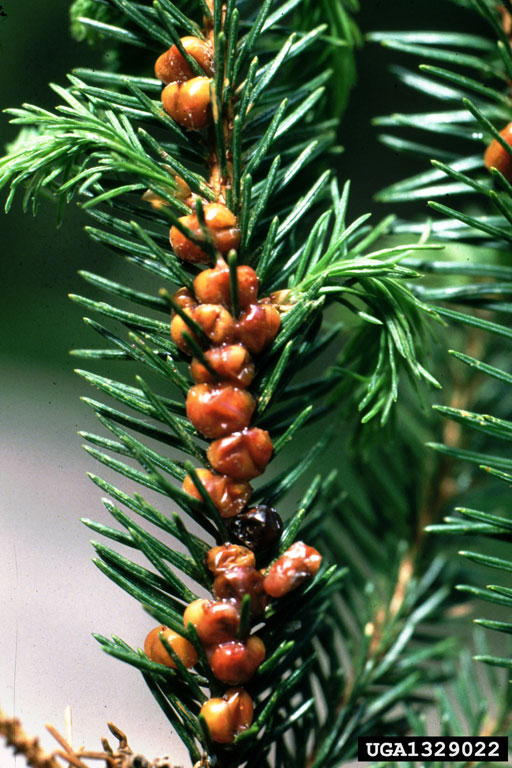
- Bud scales

Scientific classification
- Kingdom: Animalia
- Phylum: Arthropoda
- Class: Insecta
- Order: Hemiptera
- Suborder: Sternorrhyncha
- Family: Coccidae
- Genus: Physokermes; Targioni Tozzetti 1868

Species
- See text

= Physokermes =

Genus of true bugs

Physokermes are a genus of scale insects known as the bud scales. They are restricted to the Holarctic, though Physokermes hemicryphus has been introduced to North America. Some species are plant pests.

== Morphology ==
Pre-reproductive females are membranous and reddish-brown, once females begin to lay eggs they are globular or kidney-shaped become light to dark brown, and eventually heavily sclerotized. The adult females resemble the bud of their coniferous hosts, hence the name bud scale.

Physokermes are difficult to identify to species, as only pre-reproductive females can be used. Once females begin to oviposit, their bodies become distorted and it is not possible to detect the morphological features necessary to identify them to species.

== Species ==
There are 13 described species in the genus Physokermes:

- Physokermes coloradensis Cockerell 1895
- Physokermes concolor Coleman 1903 - fir bud-scale
- Physokermes fasciatusBorchsenius 1957
- Physokermes hellenicus Kozár & Gounari 2012
- Physokermes hemicryphus (Dalman) 1826 - small spruce bud-scale
- Physokermes inopinatus Danzig & Kozár 1973 - Hungarian spruce bud-scale
- Physokermes insignicola (Craw) 1894 - Montery pine scale
- Physokermes jezoensis Siraiwa 1939
- Physokermes picaefoliae Tang 1984
- Physokermes piceae (Schrank) 1801 - spruce bud-scale
- Physokermes shanxiensis Tang 1991
- Physokermes sugonjaevi Danzig 1972
- Physokermes taxifoliae Coleman 1903 - Douglas fir scale
