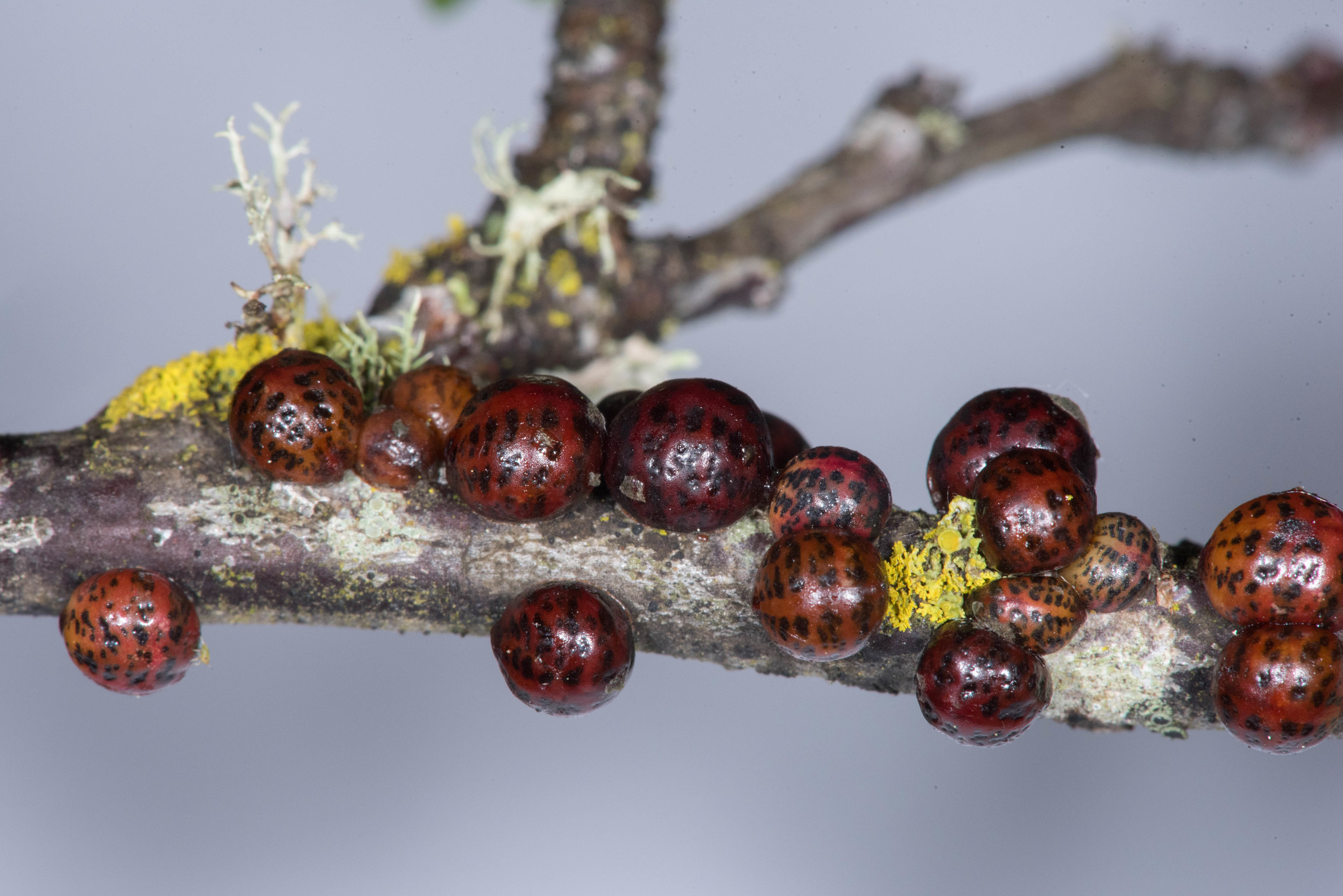
- Female Eulecanium kunoense on branch

Scientific classification
- Domain: Eukaryota
- Kingdom: Animalia
- Phylum: Arthropoda
- Class: Insecta
- Order: Hemiptera
- Suborder: Sternorrhyncha
- Family: Coccidae
- Genus: Eulecanium; Cockerell, 1893

= Eulecanium =

Genus of true bugs

Eulecanium is a genus of true bugs belonging to the family Coccidae.

The species of this genus are found in Europe, Australia and Northern America.

Selected species:

- Eulecanium albodermis Chen, 1962
- Eulecanium alnicola Chen, 1962
- Eulecanium cerasorum
- Eulecanium excrescens Ferris
- Eulecanium kunoense Kuwana, 1907
