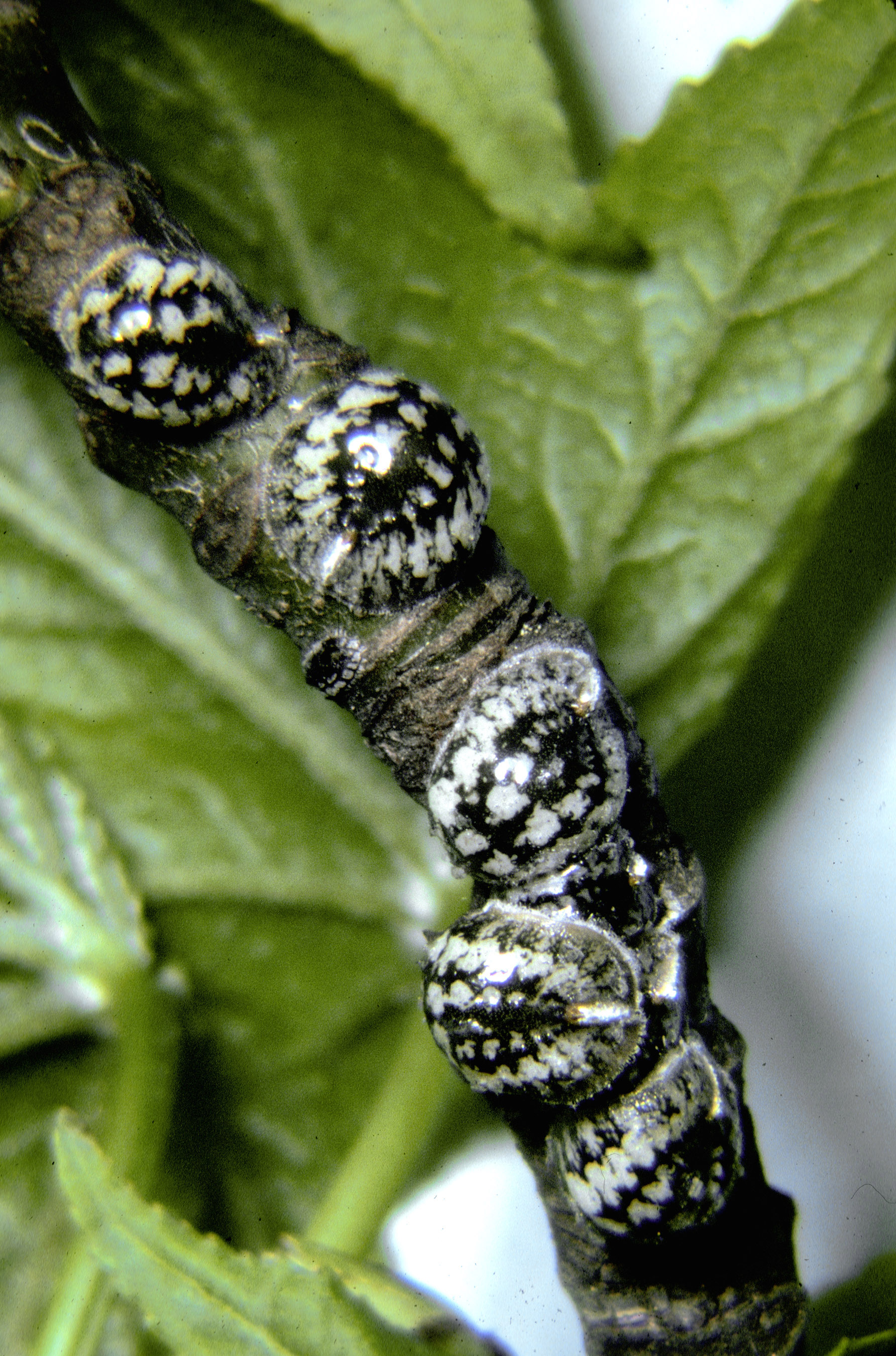

Scientific classification
- Kingdom: Animalia
- Phylum: Arthropoda
- Class: Insecta
- Order: Hemiptera
- Suborder: Sternorrhyncha
- Family: Coccidae
- Genus: Eulecanium
- Species: E. cerasorum

Binomial name
- Eulecanium cerasorum (Cockerell, 1900)

= Eulecanium cerasorum =

Species of true bug

Eulecanium cerasorum, the calico scale, is a species of scale insect. It can be identified by its white and brown color on its outer circular shell which will continuously darken over age. It is approximately one quarter of an inch in diameter. The Calico Scale is a pest to many trees in the United States, including dogwoods, honey locust, magnolias, maples, sweetgums and fruit trees. This pest typically attacks the branches which stresses the trees. Mature females produce honeydew, which promotes the growth of mold around the tree.

Ants collecting honeydew from Calico scales, then played at 30 times speed to show the pumping action of the scale.

The nymph migrates along a tree branch, then settles down and creates a circular hardened shell or cap to be its protective coat against predators and pesticides. The typical female is known to lay around 4500 eggs inside its cap.
