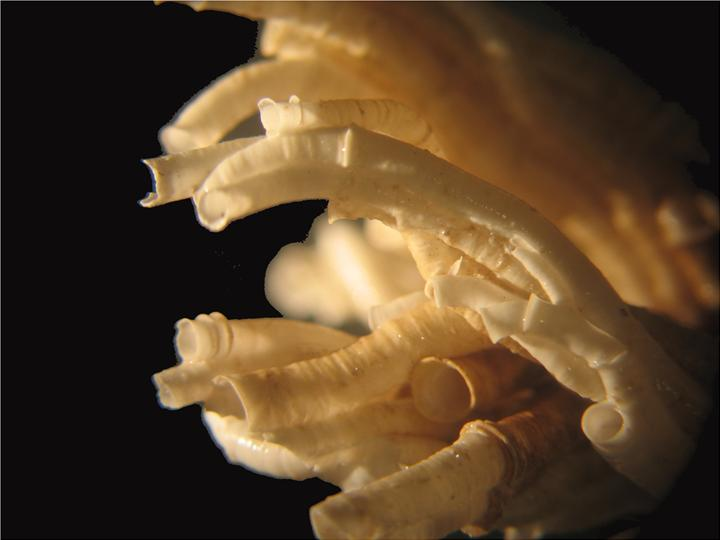
- Australian tubeworm colony

Scientific classification
- Kingdom: Animalia
- Phylum: Annelida
- Clade: Pleistoannelida
- Clade: Sedentaria
- Order: Sabellida
- Family: Serpulidae
- Genus: Ficopomatus
- Species: F. enigmaticus

Binomial name
- Ficopomatus enigmaticus (Fauvel, 1923)

Synonyms
- Mercierella enigmatica Fauvel, 1923; Phycopomatus enigmaticus (Fauvel, 1923)

= Ficopomatus enigmaticus =

Species of annelid worm

Ficopomatus enigmaticus, commonly known as the Australian tubeworm, is a species of serpulid tubeworms. Their true native range is unknown, but they probably originated in the Southern Hemisphere, perhaps from the Indian Ocean and the coastal waters of Australia. Today they have a cosmopolitan distribution, having been introduced to shallow waters worldwide. The Australian tubeworm is an invasive species that dominates and alters habitats, reduces water quality, depletes resources, and causes biofouling.

== Taxonomy ==
Ficopomatus enigmaticus is classified in the genus Ficopomatus in the family Serpulidae. They are polychaetes belonging to the order Canalipalpata, the bristle-footed or fan-head worms. The species was first described by the French zoologist Pierre Fauvel in 1923 as Mercierella enigmatica.

== Description ==
Australian tubeworms are usually about 2 to 2.5 cm (0.79 to 0.98 in) long, and up to 4 cm (1.6 in) at times. On the front end are up to 20 branching gill plumes, which are gray, green, or brown in color. The worms secrete a calcareous tube around themselves, which reaches up to 10 cm (3.9 in) long by 2 cm (0.79 in) wide. The tubes are white and turn brown with age. They are flared at the opening and has flaring rings along their lengths. The mouth can be sealed with a spiny covering (the operculum).

Australian tubeworms always live colonially, with many tubes growing together to form small clusters or large reefs. The aggregations are very dense. There can be up to 180,000 worms per square meter of reef, with the tube openings just about a millimeter apart. The tubes stick together with layers of tiny crystals. The tubes may weave together, and as new worms settle on the outer surface, the reef becomes a solid mass. Reefs of worms can be over 7 m (23 ft) long. When the invasion of Lake of Tunis in Tunisia was at its most severe, the total reef mass of the lagoon was thought to contain about 540,000 tons of carbonate. In shallow water, a reef can be circular in shape as new worms settle along the outer edges. Neighboring reefs may join together to make platforms. In a current, the reef can be elongated.

== Biology ==
Australian tubeworms are generally found in temperate and subtropical climates. They live in waters up to 3 m (9.8 ft) deep in habitat types such as estuaries and lagoons. They can tolerate a wide range of salinities, and can be found in marine and hypersaline environments, However, they are most common in brackish water. They are sensitive to wave action, and reefs usually grow in protected areas with slow-moving or stagnant water. The larvae are trochophores that drift with the zooplankton and settle onto the substrate after 20 to 25 days. They may build their tubes on established reefs or on beds of rock or shells, rocky or woody debris, reefs of other animals such as oysters, beds of vegetation, structures such as docks, piers, and marinas, or objects such as pilings and boats.

On the coast of South Africa, Australian tubeworms have been observed growing on the aquatic plant Potamogeton pectinatus. In Argentina, the larvae settle on shells such as those of the sea snail Adelomelon brasiliana and the clams Mactra isabelleana and Tagelus plebeius. In the Black Sea the reefs are associated with barnacles of the genus Balanus, caridean shrimp of the genus Palaemon, mud crabs of the genus Xantho, amphipods of the genus Orchestia, and isopods of the genus Sphaeroma. Some tubeworm reefs also have colonies of bryozoans built into them.

They are filter feeders, gathering zooplankton, phytoplankton, and detritus particles from the water and transporting them to their mouths with the cilia on their gill plumes. During their larval stage, they feed on phytoplankton. They reproduce sexually, releasing eggs and sperm into the water during spawning. They are iteroparous, able to produce more than one batch of offspring. They are also protandric hermaphrodites, changing sex from males to females. The older, larger worms in a colony are generally female. Their lifespan is 4 to 8 years.

== As an invasive species ==
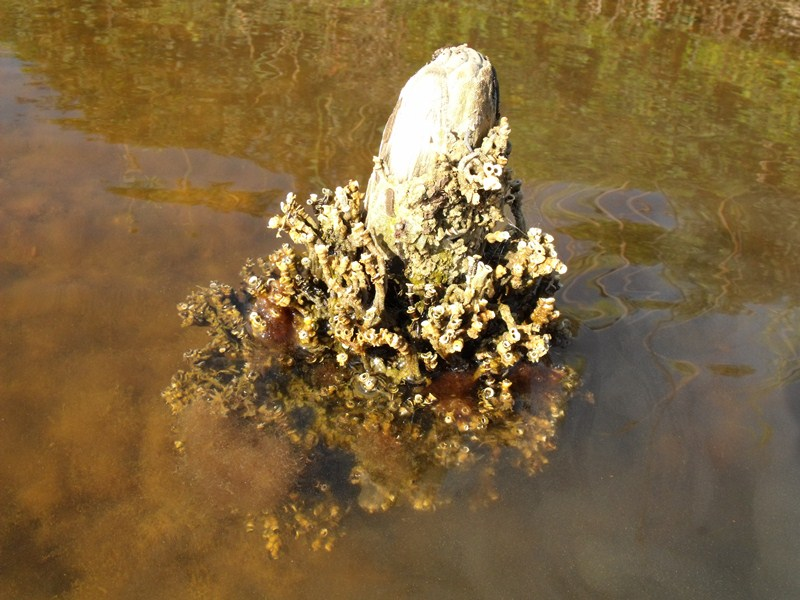
A colony in a lagoon in Italy

The Australian tubeworm is a fast-growing, aggressive species that acts as an ecosystem engineer, having drastic effects on many aspects of their environment. The worms alter the ecosystem physically, chemically, and biologically.

The bulky reefs formed by large colonies of Australian tubeworms impede the movement of water, allowing sediment to build up around them. They decrease the aesthetic value of natural lagoons, encrust the hulls of ships, clog the intakes of power plants, pose a hazard to people engaging in water recreation, and block mechanical structures such as locks. They are important biofouling organisms, forming heavy crusts on any suitable surface. Unclogging of pipes and cleaning of boats and harbor structures is costly.

Australian tubeworms easily dominate ecosystems and outcompete native fauna when colonies deplete nutrients with large-scale filter feeding. They can also survive in polluted and eutrophic, low-oxygen waters that other organisms cannot tolerate as well. They can provide surfaces for the growth of other introduced species, such as the hydrozoan Cordylophora caspia and the barnacle Balanus improvisus. They can also facilitate the overgrowth of algae. In sewage-polluted waters they can thrive on the organic particles, creating large colonies that become covered in algae, further decreasing the water quality. They are known to form colonies on the shells of living animals, such as turtles, molluscs, and crabs.

Some of the effects of the tubeworm are initially positive. Their efficient filter feeding clears the water of particles, increasing oxygen. They increase species richness and animal abundance by providing shelter and improved water quality. The microfauna increase. Larger populations of life forms attract detritivores. Reefs are used as resting spots by birds such as swans. Positive effects of the worm can be outweighed by their dominance of the ecosystem. As they feed, they can deplete resources, and by doing so they have been known to replace native species in the habitat. They shelter and support other introduced species. Even when they benefit native species, the outcome can be detrimental. For example, in Argentina the reefs are inhabited by the omnivorous native crab Cyrtograpsus angulatus, which forms dense populations once established. They then prey heavily on many other species. They also increase turbidity and alter the substrate with their burrowing activity.

Australian tubeworms are introduced to new habitat when they are transported on ship hulls, in ballasts, and on shells. Management options are mainly limited to the prevention of new introductions. Methods include deoxygenating ballast water to kill larvae and simply scraping the tubes off of ships and other surfaces.

== Gallery ==
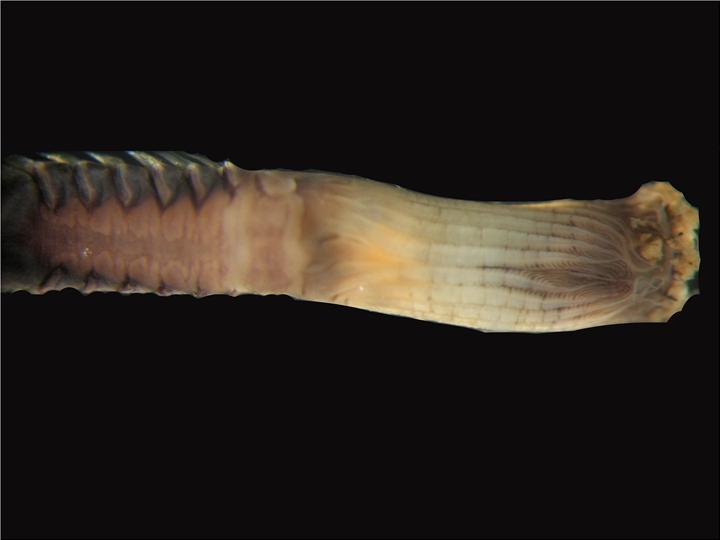
Individual worm

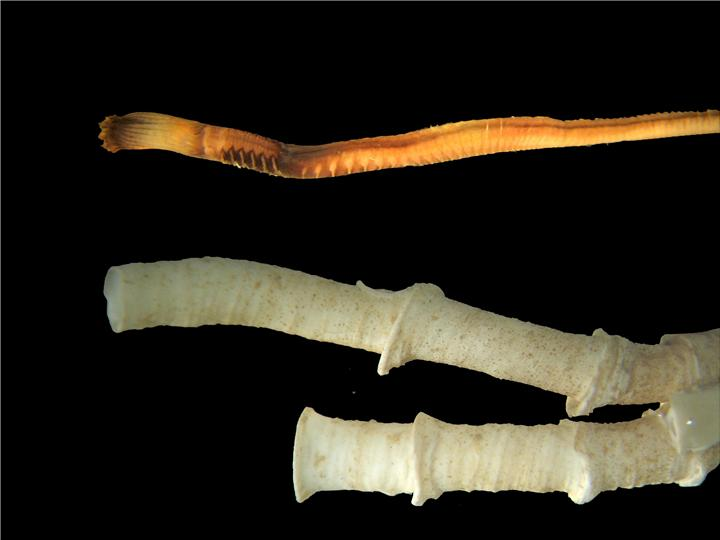
Worm and tubes

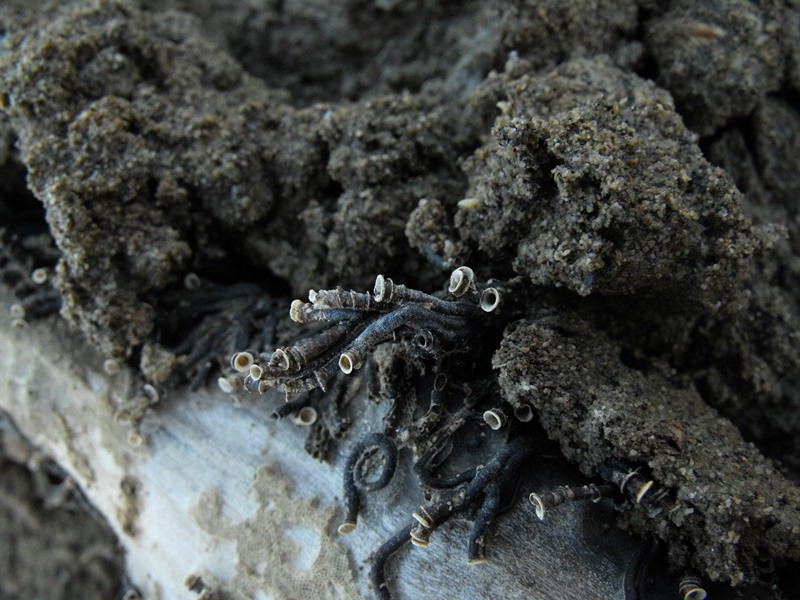
A small colony of Australian tubeworms

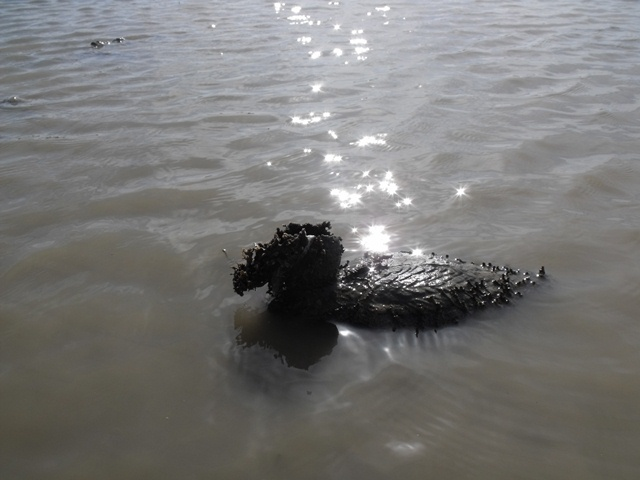
Australian tubeworms encrusting a duck decoy
