= Luzulaspis =

Scientific classification
- Kingdom: Animalia
- Phylum: Arthropoda
- Class: Insecta
- Order: Hemiptera
- Suborder: Sternorrhyncha
- Family: Coccidae
- Genus: Luzulaspis; Targioni Tozzetti, 1868

Genus of true bugs

Luzulaspis is a genus of true bugs belonging to the family Coccidae.

The species of this genus are found in Europe and Northern America.

Species:

- Luzulaspis americana Koteja & Howell, 1979
- Luzulaspis bisetosa Borchsenius, 1952
