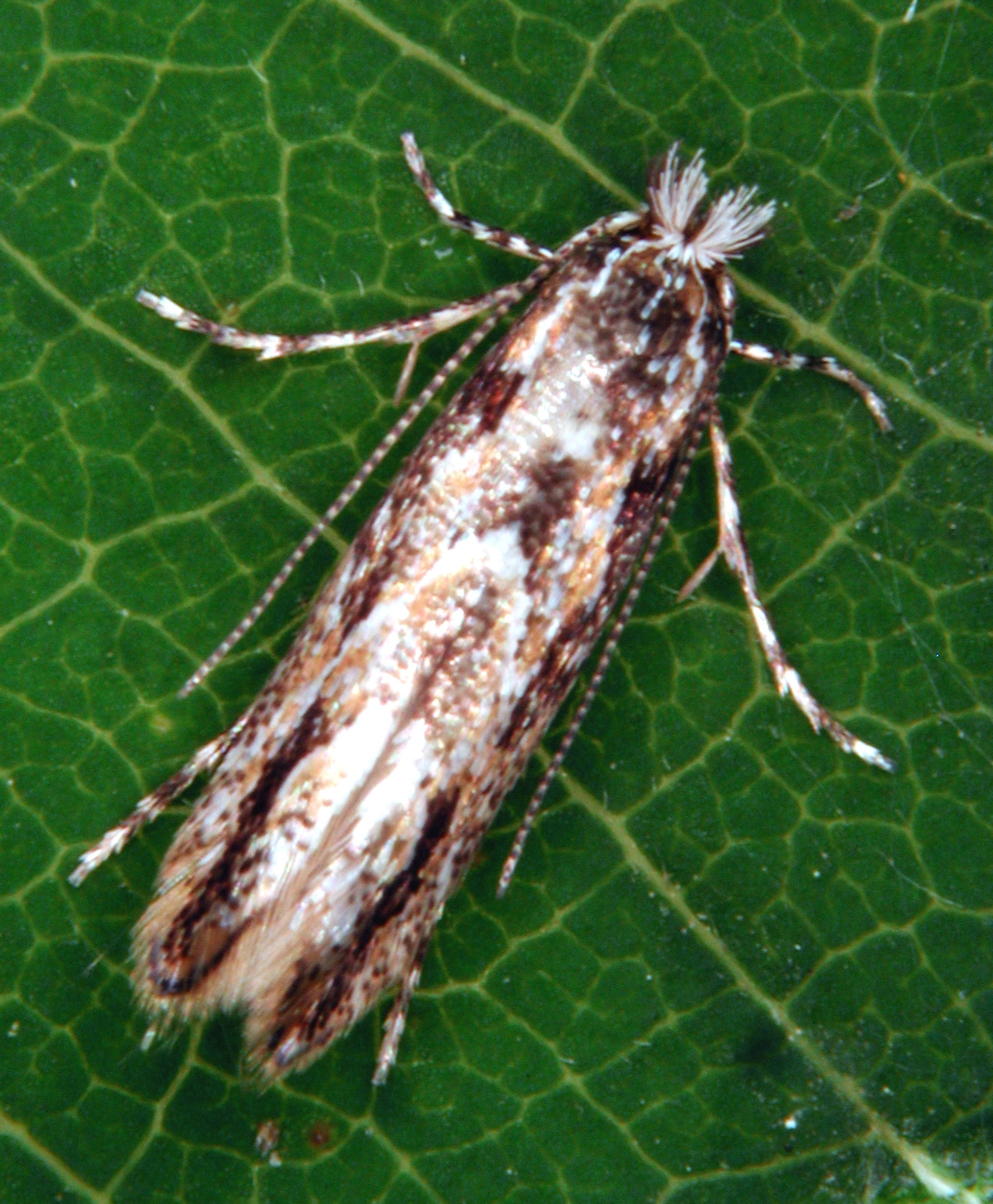

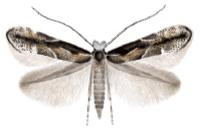

Scientific classification
- Kingdom: Animalia
- Phylum: Arthropoda
- Class: Insecta
- Order: Lepidoptera
- Family: Gracillariidae
- Genus: Phyllonorycter
- Species: P. issikii

Binomial name
- Phyllonorycter issikii (Kumata, 1963)

Synonyms
- Lithocolletis issikii Kumata, 1963

= Phyllonorycter issikii =

Species of moth

The lime leaf miner (Phyllonorycter issikii) is a moth of the family Gracillariidae. It is native to Japan, Korea and eastern Russia, but was probably introduced to eastern Europe around 1970. It is now widespread in the Czech Republic and Slovakia and is expanding its range in Hungary and Germany. It has also been recorded from the Baltic states and also the Benelux in 2009.

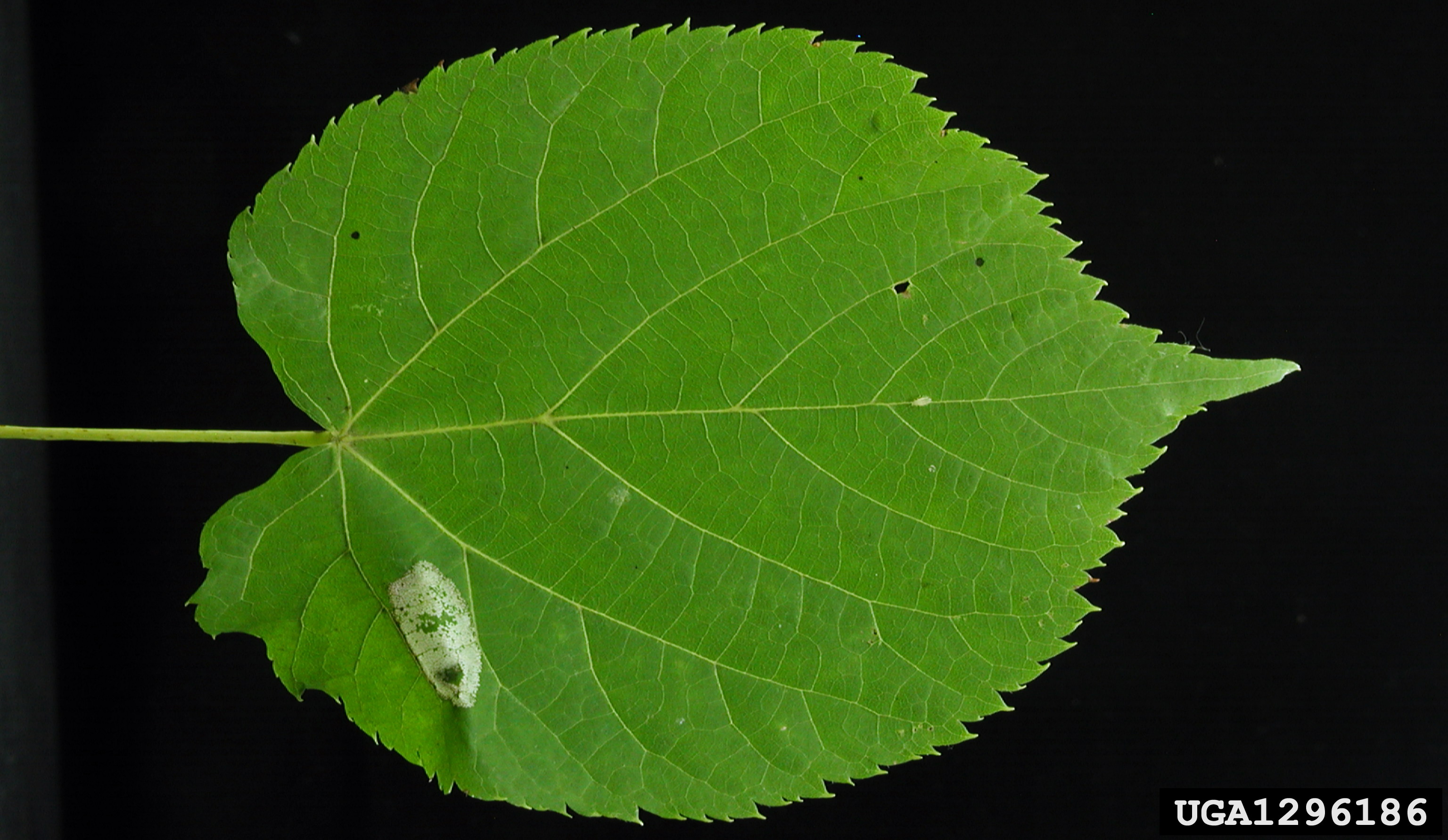
Damage

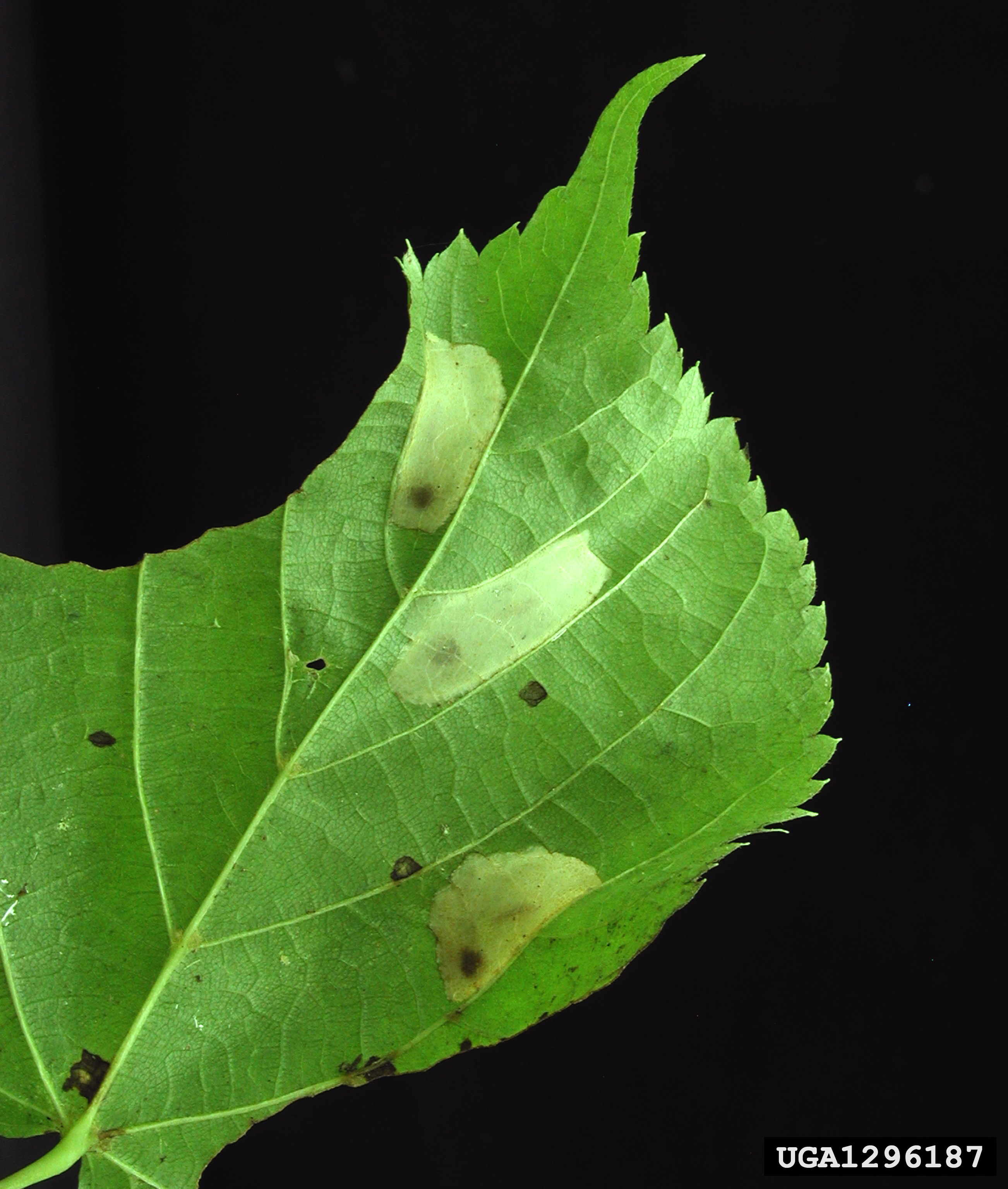
Damage

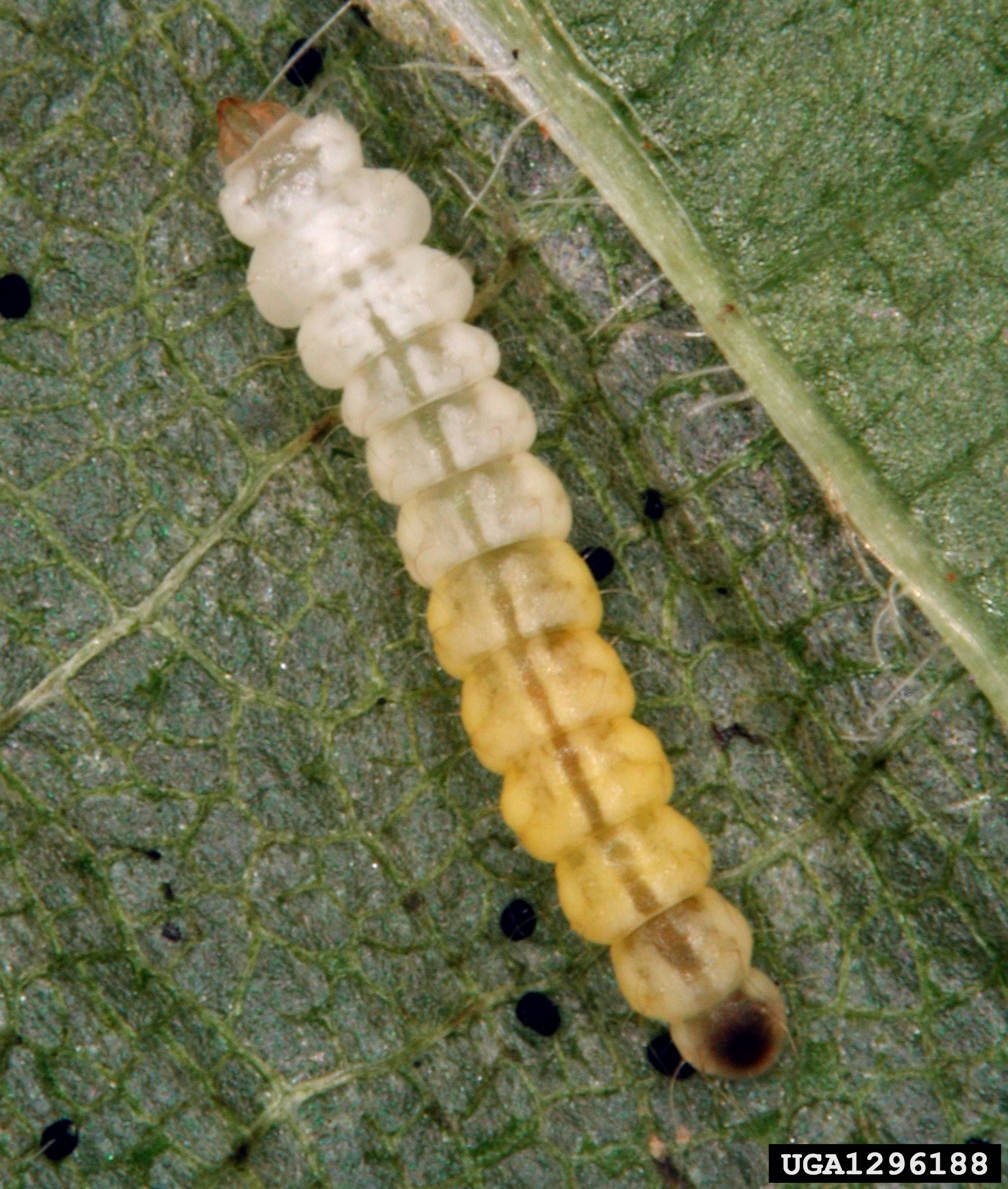
Larva

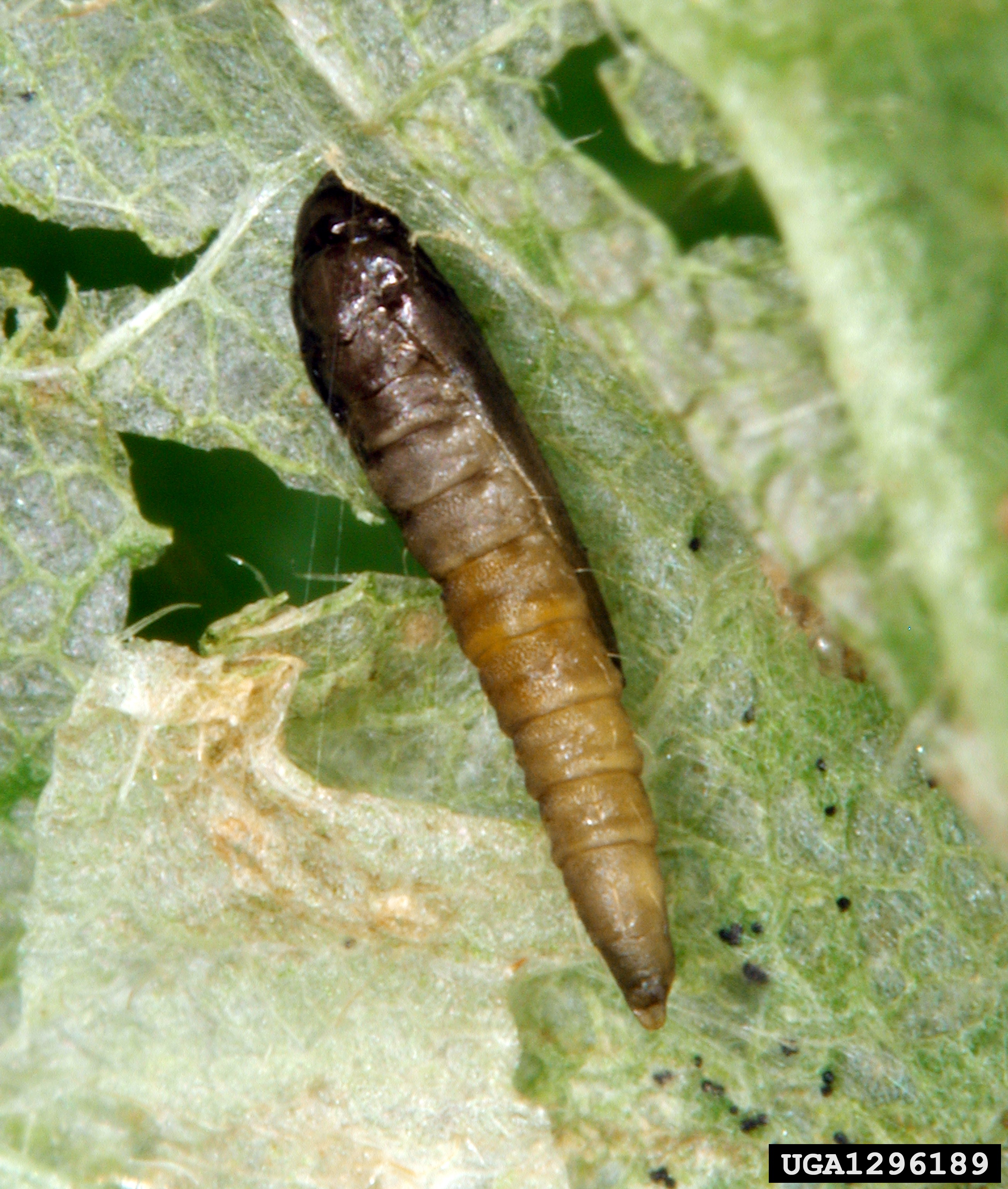
Pupa

The wingspan is 7-7.5 mm. Adults are on wing from the end of June to mid-July and from the end of July to the end of August in two generations.

The larvae feed on Tilia americana, Tilia cordata and Tilia platyphyllos. They mine the leaves of their host plant.
