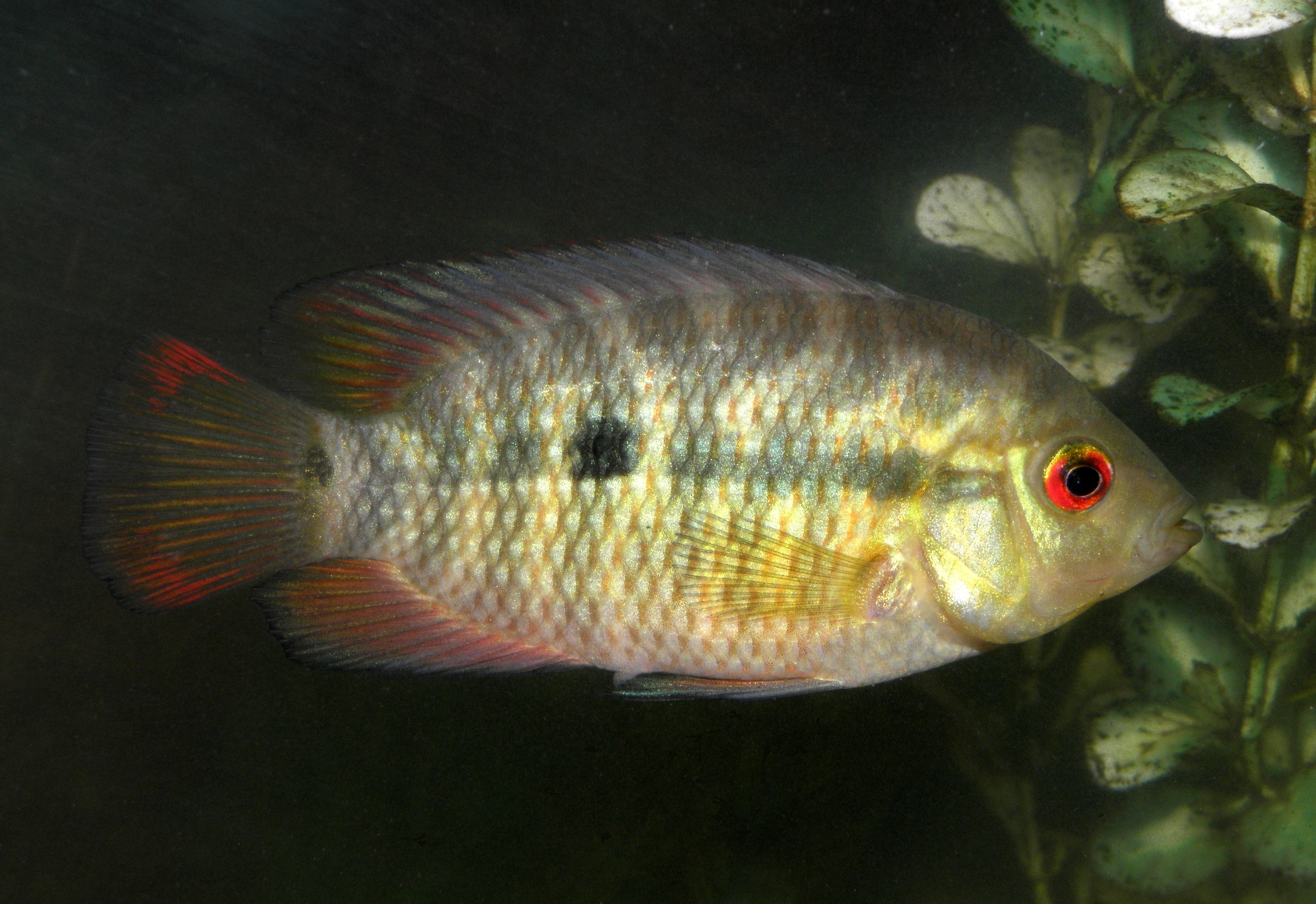

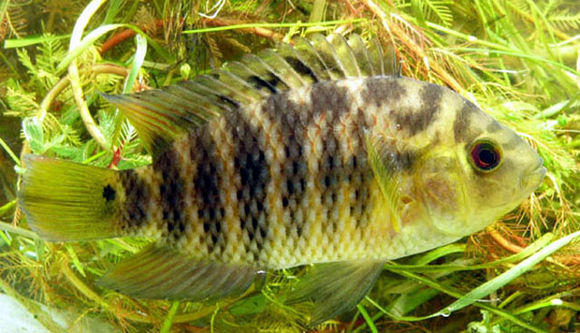

Scientific classification
- Kingdom: Animalia
- Phylum: Chordata
- Class: Actinopterygii
- Division: Teleostei
- Order: Cichliformes
- Family: Cichlidae
- Genus: Australoheros
- Species: A. facetus

Binomial name
- Australoheros facetus (Jenyns, 1842)
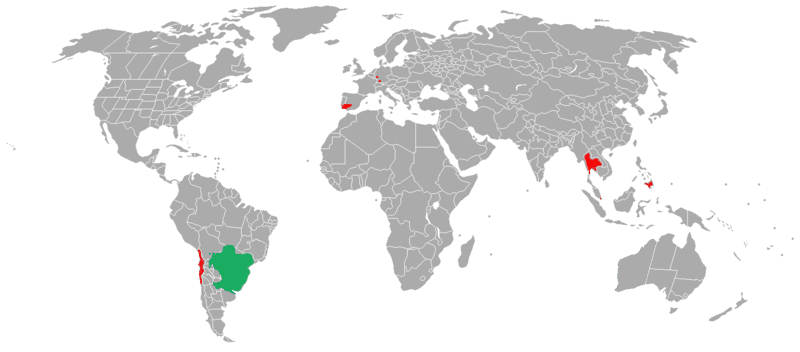
- Distribution map of Australoheros facetus, green denotes the native range, red the introduced range

Synonyms
- Chromis facetus Jenyns, 1842; Cichlasoma facetum (Jenyns, 1842); Herichthys facetum (Jenyns, 1842); Chromys oblonga Castelnau, 1855; Heros jenynsii Steindachner, 1869

= Australoheros facetus =

Species of fish

Australoheros facetus, formerly Cichlasoma facetum, the chameleon cichlid or chanchito, is a species of cichlid from the subfamily Cichlasomatinae which is native to northern Argentina, Paraguay, Uruguay and southern Brazil.

== Description ==
Australoheros facetus has a high and deeply compressed body which is covered with large scales. It has a small, upward pointing mouth in which the jaws do not reach farther than the forward margin of the eye. It has a long dorsal fin which extends to two thirds of the total length of the fish. The caudal fin has a rounded shape.

It is distinguished from other species in the genus Australoheros by its longer lower jaw, upward pointing mouth and in having the shortest dorsal scale cover and the fewest scales on the dorsal and anal fins. Most specimens, 80% of fish, have four abdominal bars while these are present in only half of the individuals of its congeners. They normally attain 18 centimetres (7.1 in) in length but males have been recorded at 60 centimetres (24 in) The colour varies from brassy yellow through to greenish and even black and it is normally marked with a number of dark transverse bands. The males are larger than the females with larger fins.

== Distribution ==
Australoheros facetus has a native range in the Río de la Plata Basin in Argentina, Brazil, Paraguay and Uruguay, and in the coastal drainages of Uruguay, Rio Grande do Sul in Brazil and Buenos Aires in Argentina. It has been introduced and established to southern Iberia and Chile. It is also known to have been introduced to Germany and the Philippines but it failed to establish in Germany and its status in the Philippines is not known.

== Habitat and biology ==
Australoheros facetus is a freshwater species which occurs in creeks, rivers, swamps and lakes. It is a diurnal species which is omnivorous and rather opportunistic in its feeding habits. Its diet is known to include detritus and plants and it preys on small aquatic animals, even small fish, but mainly molluscs and insect larvae. It tolerates low temperatures. A. facetus has been recorded as a host of the trematode Centrocestus formosanus, an intestinal parasite of piscivorous birds and mammals, which is known to infect people in its native range which is Asia.

Chameleon cichlids lay their eggs on a stone or piece of wood in the open and the eggs and fry are cared for by both parents for up to three weeks, with the eggs hatching after 2–4 days. In the rivers it has been introduced to in Europe it breeds spawns when the temperature climbs to more than 28–30 °C (82–86 °F). Pairs are formed for spawning and both sexes are territorial. In Iberia breeding occurs in the months of April to June.

== Name ==
The type specimen was collected by Charles Darwin during his time on board H.M.S. Beagle and the species was described as Chromis facetus by Leonard Jenyns in 1842 in The zoology of the voyage of the H. M. S. Beagle, under the command of Captain Fitzroy, R. N., during the years 1832 to 1836. The specific name means "well made" or "fine" and Jenyns does not explain why he chose this name. The English common name, chameleon cichlid, seems to originate in Brazil where this species is called acara camaleao, the "chameleon fish", as it was one of the first fishes to be observed to have an ability to change its colour. The alternative common name, chanchito is Spanish and means "piglet" and refers to its pugnacious nature and habit of digging up plants.

== Aquaria ==
The chameleon cichlid is tolerant of a wide variety of water conditions and was one of the first species to be widespread in the hobby of fishkeeping and they are easy to breed.
