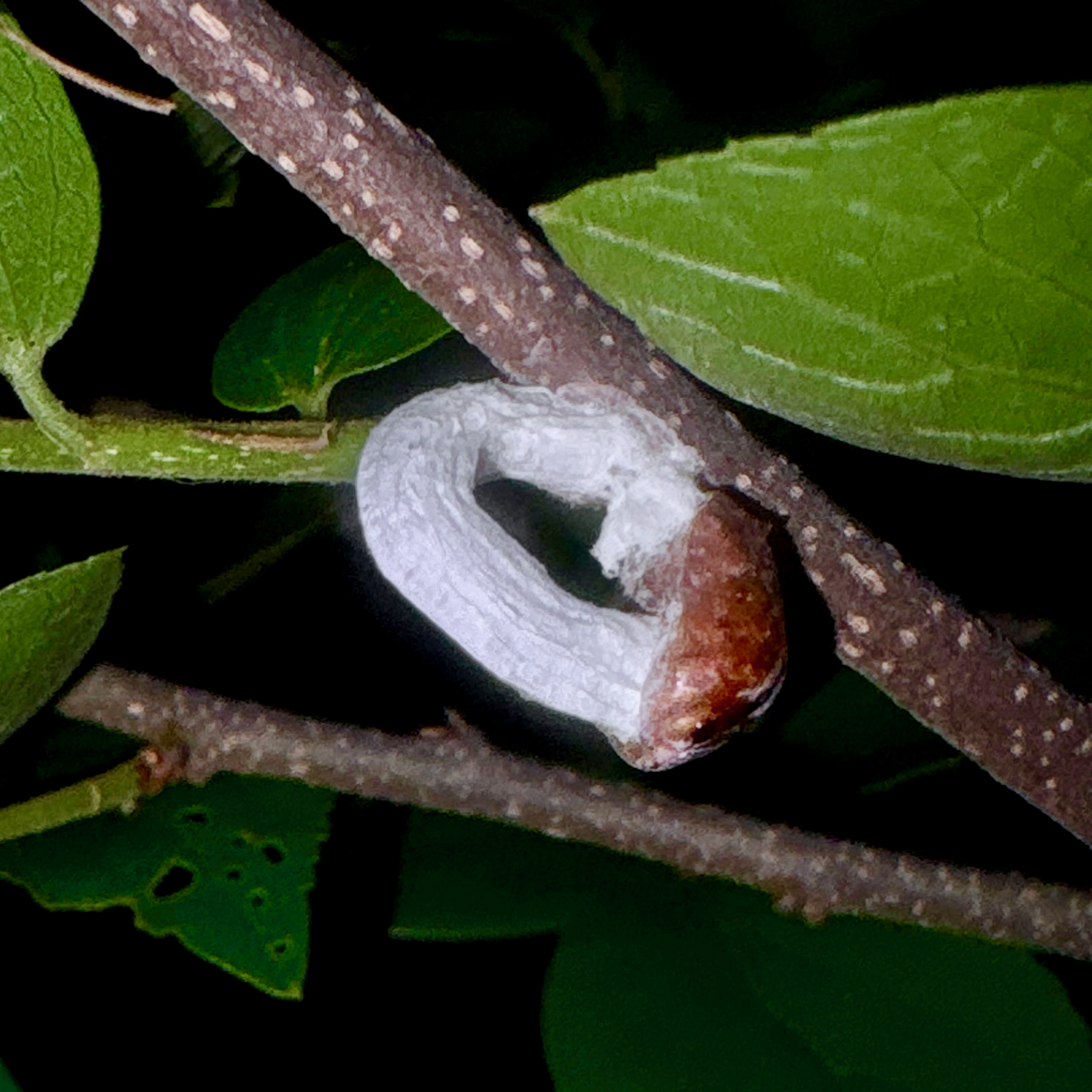
- Takahashia japonica and its ootheca on a tree branch
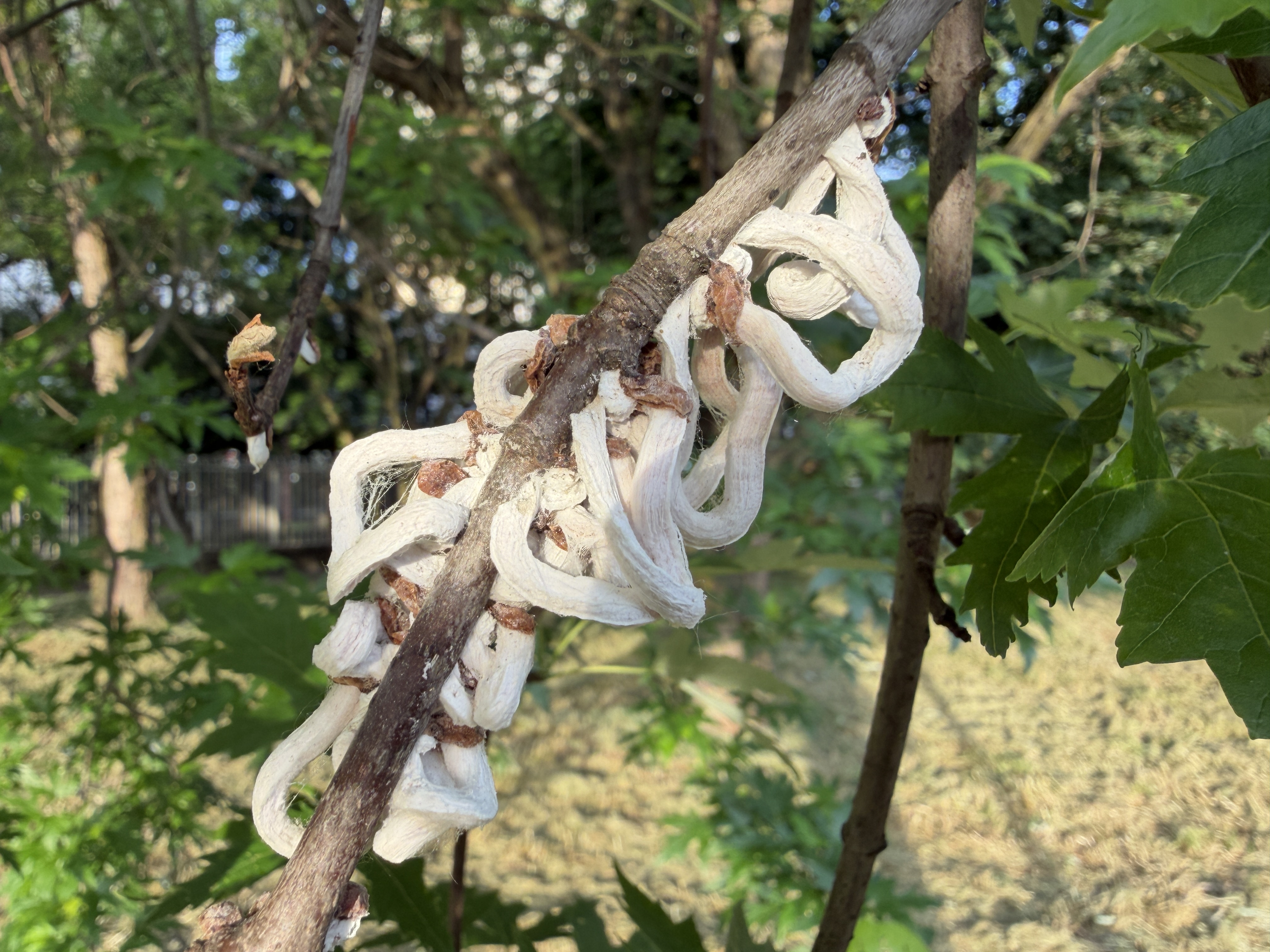
- Oothecae on a tree in Milan, Italy

Scientific classification
- Kingdom: Animalia
- Phylum: Arthropoda
- Clade: Pancrustacea
- Class: Insecta
- Order: Hemiptera
- Suborder: Sternorrhyncha
- Family: Coccidae
- Genus: Takahashia
- Species: T. japonica

Binomial name
- Takahashia japonica (Cockerell, 1896)

Synonyms
- Pulvinaria japonica Cockerell, 1896

= Takahashia japonica =

Species of insect

Takahashia japonica - the string cottony scale - is an insect pest of ornamental- and economic trees in the Coccidae family. It is a pest of quarantine significance in the EPPO area.

Takahashia japonica is a highly adaptable pest that attacks a large number of deciduous trees. Known host plants include trees of the genera Acer, Albizia, Alnus, Celtis, Citrus, Cornus, Cydonia, Diospyros, Juglans, Magnolia, Morus, Parthenocissus, Prunus, Pyrus, Robinia, Sophora and Salix.

Adult females are light brown in colour, reaching up to 7 mm in length and 4 mm in width. They produce tubular ring-shaped white waxy oothecae up to 5 cm long. The cottony sacs remain attached to branches even after hatching.

In Croatia, where it is an invasive species, it produces one generation per year. Egg hatching occurs during June. The nymphs then move to the underside of leaves. At the end of summer they return to the host and pupate. Nymphs are dispersed by wind and over longer distances probably through infected plants.

The species is not harmful to humans, but causes significant leaf loss on infested plants.

== Range ==
=== Invasive range ===
First detected in Italy, in Cerro Maggiore, in 2017 on Morus nigra, and the United Kingdom in December 2018 in Berkshire on Magnolia. T. japonica was then found in Croatia in 2019 in Pula, but was not identified until found again on Albizia julibrissin in May 2020.
