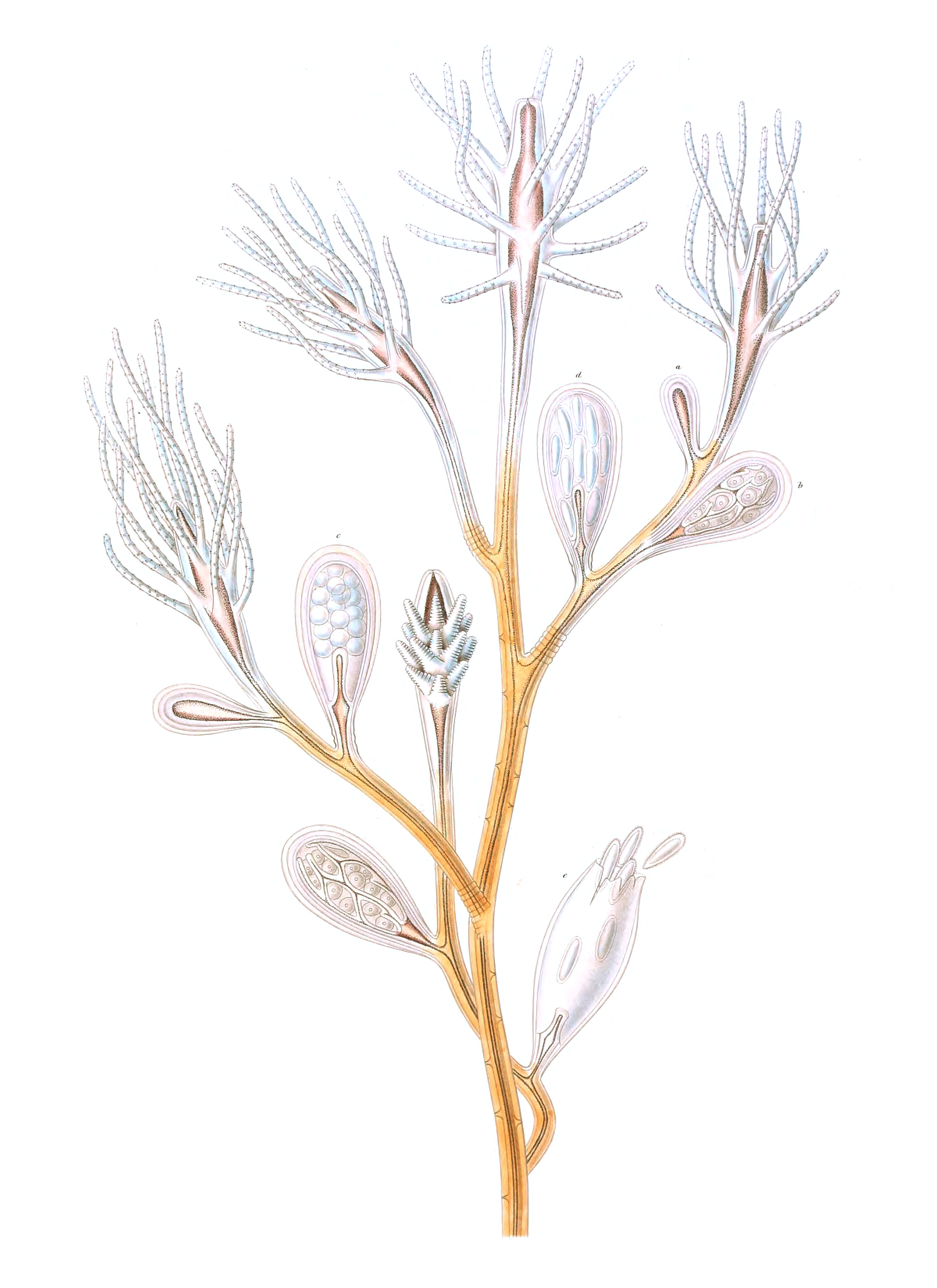

Scientific classification
- Kingdom: Animalia
- Phylum: Cnidaria
- Class: Hydrozoa
- Order: Anthoathecata
- Family: Cordylophoridae
- Genus: Cordylophora
- Species: C. caspia

Binomial name
- Cordylophora caspia (Pallas, 1771)

Synonyms
- Bimeria baltica Stechow, 1927; Cordylophora albicola Kirchenpauer in Busk, 1861; Cordylophora americana Leidy, 1870; Cordylophora lacustris Allman, 1844; Cordylophora otagoensis Fyfe, 1929; Cordylophora whiteleggi von Lendenfeld, 1886; Tubularia cornea Aghardh, 1816

= Cordylophora caspia =

Species of hydrozoan

Cordylophora caspia (or freshwater hydroid) is a species of athecate hydroid in the family Cordylophoridae.

== Distribution ==
C. caspia is native to brackish and fresh water habitats around the Black Sea and Caspian Sea. From there it has spread, on the hulls of ships or by some other means, via channels and inland waterways to most of the temperate and tropical world. It arrived in the Baltic Sea in the early nineteenth century and spread rapidly to the estuaries and inland waterways of Western Europe, reaching Ireland by 1842. By 1885 it had made its way to Australia and by 1944 to Panama. It has not reached Antarctica.
