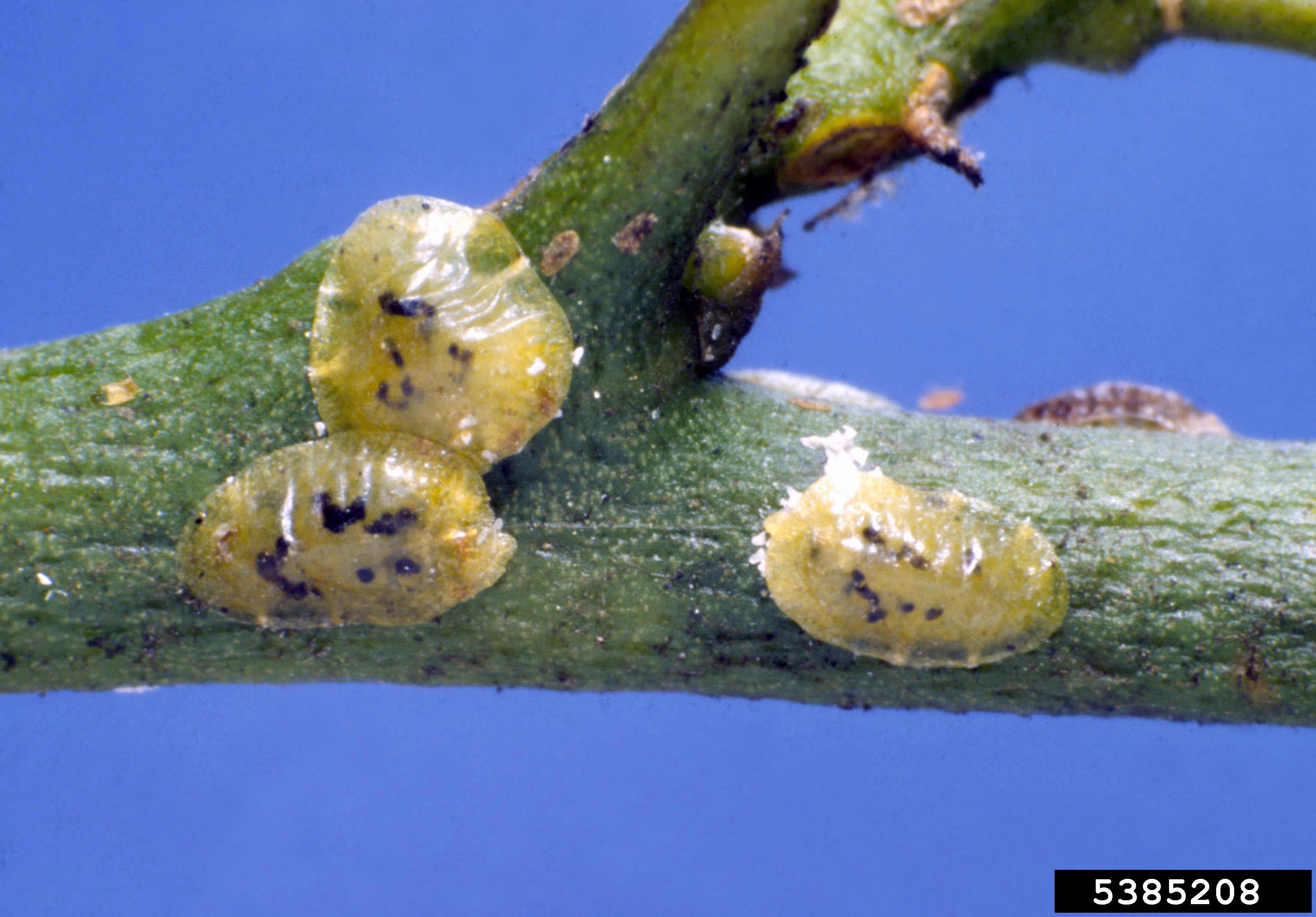
- Green scale, Coccus viridis.

Scientific classification
- Kingdom: Animalia
- Phylum: Arthropoda
- Clade: Pancrustacea
- Class: Insecta
- Order: Hemiptera
- Suborder: Sternorrhyncha
- Superfamily: Coccoidea
- Family: Coccidae

Genera
- See text

= Coccidae =

Family of true bugs

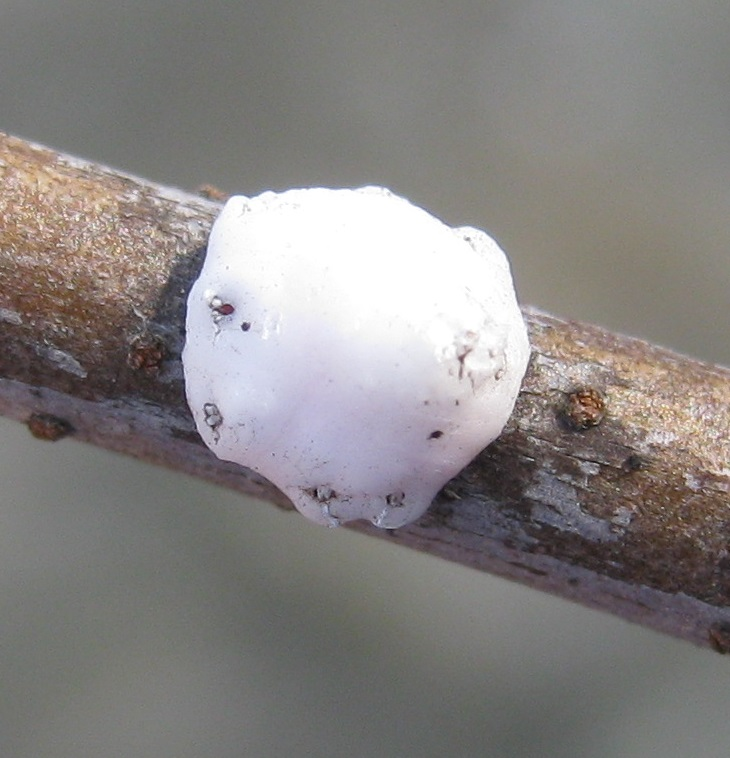
Wax scale, Ceroplastes cirripediformis

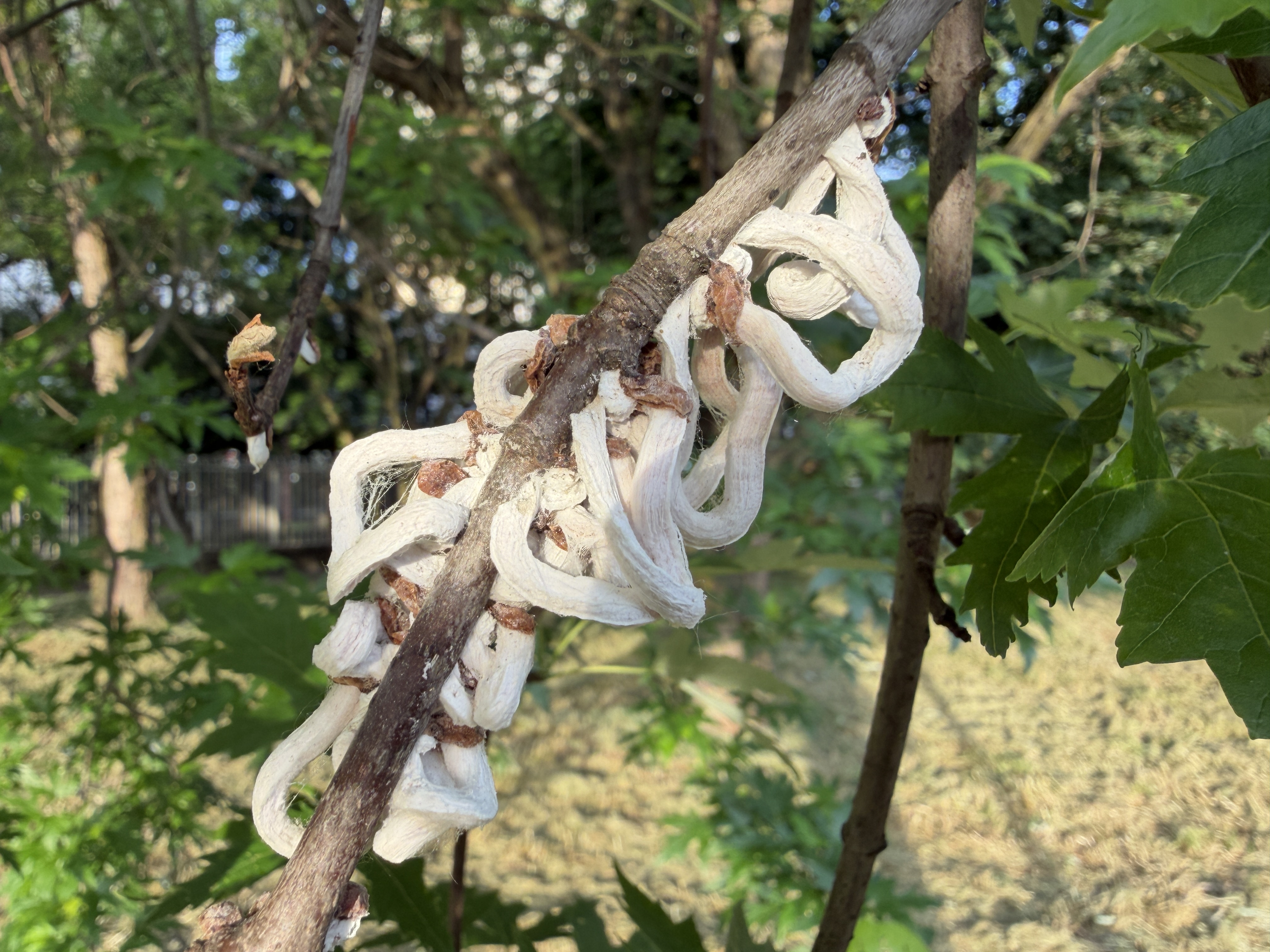
Takahashia japonica oothecae on a tree in Milan, Italy

Coccidae, from Ancient Greek κόκκος (kókkos), meaning "kernel" or "Kermes", are a family of scale insects belonging to the superfamily Coccoidea. They are commonly known as soft scales, wax scales or tortoise scales. The females are flat with elongated oval bodies and a smooth integument which may be covered with wax. In some genera they possess legs but in others, they do not, and the antennae may be shortened or missing. The males may be winged or wingless.

== Genera ==
There are >1,100 spp. in 171 genera worldwide.

- Subfamily Myzolecaniinae
  - Akermes
  - Alecanium
  - Alecanopsis
  - Cribolecanium
  - Cryptostigma
  - Cyclolecanium
  - Halococcus
  - Houardia
  - Megasaissetia
  - Myzolecanium
  - Neolecanium
  - Paractenochiton
  - Pseudophilippia
  - Richardiella
  - Torarchus
  - Toumeyella
  - Xenolecanium
- Antecerococcus
- Ceroplastes
- Coccus Linnaeus, 1758
- Eucalymnatus Cockerell, 1901
- Eulecanium
- Kilifia De Lotto, 1965
- Lecanium
- Luzulaspis Targioni Tozzetti, 1868
- Maacoccus Tao, Wong & Chang, 1983
- Metaceronema
- Milviscutulus
- Paralecanium Cockerell in Cockerell & Parrott 1899
- Parasaissetia Takahashi 1955
- Parthenolecanium Šulc 1908
- Physokermes Targioni Tozzetti 1868
- Protopulvinaria Cockerell 1894
- Pulvinaria Targioni-tozzetti, 1867
- Saissetia Deplanche, 1858
- Takahashia Cockerell, 1896

== See also ==
- Coccus viridis
- Eulecanium cerasorum
- Maacoccus arundinariae
- Pulvinaria innumerabilis
