= List of Argulidae species =

As of December 2022, the following species of sea lice are recognised in the family Argulidae:

Argulus O. F. Müller, 1785:

- Argulus africanus Thiele, 1900
- Argulus alexandrensis Wilson C.B., 1923
- Argulus alosae Gould, 1841
- Argulus amazonicus Malta & Santos-Silva, 1986
- Argulus ambloplites Wilson C.B., 1920
- Argulus ambystoma Poly, 2003
- Argulus americanus Wilson C.B., 1902
- Argulus angelae Souza, Porto & Malta, 2019
- Argulus angusticeps Cunnington, 1913
- Argulus annae Schuurmans Stekhoven J.H. Jr, 1951
- Argulus appendiculosus Wilson C.B., 1907
- Argulus arcassonensis Cuénot, 1912
- Argulus australiensis Byrnes, 1985
- Argulus belones Kampen, 1909
- Argulus bengalensis Ramakrishna, 1952
- Argulus bicolor Bere, 1936
- Argulus boli Tripathi, 1975
- Argulus borealis Wilson C.B., 1912
- Argulus brachypeltis Fryer, 1959
- Argulus caecus Wilson C.B., 1922
- Argulus capensis Barnard, 1955
- Argulus carteri Cunnington, 1931
- Argulus catostomi Dana & Herrick, 1837
- Argulus cauveriensis Thomas & Devaraj, 1975
- Argulus celioi Souza & Malta, 2018
- Argulus chesapeakensis Cressey, 1971
- Argulus chicomendesi Malta & Varella, 2000
- Argulus chilensis Martinez, 1952
- Argulus chinensis Ku & Wang, 1955
- Argulus chiropteroideus Aguiar, Rosim, Santos, Luque, Ceccarelli, Adriano & Tavares, 2017
- Argulus chromidis Krøyer, 1863
- Argulus confusus Rushton-Mellor, 1994
- Argulus coregoni Thorell, 1865
- Argulus cubensis Wilson C.B., 1936
- Argulus cunningtoni Fryer, 1965
- Argulus dactylopteri Thorell, 1865
- Argulus dageti Dollfus, 1960
- Argulus dartevellei Brian, 1940
- Argulus diversicolor Byrnes, 1985
- Argulus diversus Wilson C.B., 1944
- Argulus ellipticaudatus Wang K.N., 1960
- Argulus elongatus Heller, 1857
- Argulus ernsti Weibezahn & Cobo, 1964
- Argulus exiguus Cunnington, 1913
- Argulus flavescens Wilson C.B., 1916
- Argulus floridensis Meehan, 1940
- Argulus fluviatilis Thomas & Devaraj, 1975
- Argulus foliaceus (Linnaeus, 1758)
- Argulus fryeri Rushton-Mellor, 1994
- Argulus funduli Krøyer, 1863
- Argulus fuscus Bere, 1936
- Argulus giganteus Ramakrishna, 1952
- Argulus giordanii Brian, 1959
- Argulus gracilis Rushton-Mellor, 1994
- Argulus hylae Lemos de Castro & Gomes-Correa, 1985
- Argulus ichesi Bouvier, 1910
- Argulus incisus Cunnington, 1913
- Argulus indicus Weber, 1892
- Argulus ingens Wilson C.B., 1912
- Argulus intectus Wilson C.B., 1944
- Argulus izintwala Van As J.G. & Van As L.L., 2001
- Argulus japonicus Thiele, 1900
- Argulus jollymani Fryer, 1956
- Argulus juparanensis Lemos de Castro, 1950
- Argulus kosus Avenant-Oldewage, 1994
- Argulus kunmingensis Shen, 1940
- Argulus kusafugu Yamaguti & Yamasu, 1959
- Argulus laticauda Smith S.I., 1874
- Argulus lepidostei Kellicott, 1877
- Argulus longicaudatus Wilson C.B., 1944
- Argulus lunatus Wilson C.B., 1944
- Argulus macropterus Heegaard, 1962
- Argulus maculosus Wilson C.B., 1902
- Argulus maharashtrians Bari, 2018
- Argulus major Wang K.N., 1960
- Argulus mangalorensis Natarajan, 1982
- Argulus matuii Sikama, 1938
- Argulus meehani Cressey, 1971
- Argulus megalops Smith S.I., 1874
- Argulus melanostictus Wilson C.B., 1935
- Argulus melita Beneden, 1891
- Argulus mexicanus Pineda, Paramo & del Rio, 1995
- Argulus mississippiensis Wilson C.B., 1916
- Argulus mongolianus Tokioka, 1939
- Argulus monodi Fryer, 1959
- Argulus moratoi Souza & Malta, 2020
- Argulus mugili Wang K.N., 1961
- Argulus multicolor Schuurmans Stekhoven J.H. Jr, 1937
- Argulus multipocula Barnard, 1955
- Argulus nativus Kirtisinghe, 1959
- Argulus nattereri Heller, 1857
- Argulus niger Wilson C.B., 1902
- Argulus nobilis Thiele, 1904
- Argulus onodai Tokioka, 1936
- Argulus papuensis Rushton-Mellor, 1994
- Argulus paranensis Ringuelet, 1943
- Argulus parsi Tripathi, 1975
- Argulus patagonicus Ringuelet, 1943
- Argulus personatus Cunnington, 1913
- Argulus peruvianus Oliva, Duran & Verano, 1980
- Argulus pestifer Ringuelet, 1948
- Argulus piperatus Wilson C.B., 1920
- Argulus plecoglossi Yamaguti, 1937
- Argulus poeyi Fernández Osorio & Corrada Wong, 2015
- Argulus pugettensis Dana, 1852-1853
- Argulus puthenveliensis Ramakrishna, 1959
- Argulus quadristriatus Devaraj & Ameer Hamsa, 1977
- Argulus reticulatus Wilson C.B., 1920
- Argulus rhamdiae Wilson C.B., 1936
- Argulus rhipidiophorus Monod, 1931
- Argulus rijckmansii Brian, 1940
- Argulus rotundus Wilson C.B., 1944
- Argulus rubescens Cunnington, 1913
- Argulus rubropunctatus Cunnington, 1913
- Argulus salminei Krøyer, 1863
- Argulus schoutedeni Monod, 1928
- Argulus scutiformis Thiele, 1900
- Argulus siamensis Wilson C.B., 1926
- Argulus sindhensis Mahar & Jafri, 2011
- Argulus spinulosus Silva, 1980
- Argulus stizostethii Kellicott, 1880
- Argulus striatus Cunnington, 1913
- Argulus taliensis Shen, 1948
- Argulus tientsinensis Ku & Wang, 1956
- Argulus trachynoti Brian, 1927
- Argulus trilineatus Wilson C.B., 1904
- Argulus tristramellae Paperna, 1967
- Argulus varians Bere, 1936
- Argulus ventanensis Taznola & Villegas-Ojeda, 2017
- Argulus versicolor Wilson C.B., 1902
- Argulus vierai Fonseca, 1939
- Argulus violaceus Thomsen, 1925
- Argulus vittatus (Rafinesque-Schmaltz, 1814)
- Argulus wilsoni Brian, 1940
- Argulus ybatecobe Souza, Porto & Malta, 2018
- Argulus yucatanus Poly, 2005
- Argulus yuii Wang K.N., 1958
- Argulus yunnanensis Shen, 1948

Chonopeltis Thiele, 1900:

- Chonopeltis australis Boxshall, 1976
- Chonopeltis brevis Fryer, 1961
- Chonopeltis congicus Fryer, 1959
- Chonopeltis elongatus Fryer, 1974
- Chonopeltis flaccifrons Fryer, 1960
- Chonopeltis fryeri Van As, 1986
- Chonopeltis inermis Thiele, 1900
- Chonopeltis lisikili Van As J.G. & Van As L.L., 1996
- Chonopeltis liversedgi Van As & Van As, 1999
- Chonopeltis meridionalis Fryer, 1964
- Chonopeltis minutus Fryer, 1977
- Chonopeltis schoutedeni Brian, 1940

Dipteropeltis Callman, 1912:

- Dipteropeltis longicaudatus
- Dipteropeltis campanaformis Neethling, Oliveira Malta & Avenant-Oldewage, 2014
- Dipteropeltis hirundo Calman, 1912

Dolops Audouin, 1837:

- Dolops bidentata (Bouvier, 1899)
- Dolops carvalhoi Lemos de Castro, 1949
- Dolops discoidalis Bouvier, 1899
- Dolops geayi (Bouvier, 1897)
- Dolops intermedia da Silva, 1978
- Dolops kollari (Heller, 1857)
- Dolops longicauda (Heller, 1857)
- Dolops nana Lemos de Castro, 1950
- Dolops ranarum (Stuhlmann, 1892)
- Dolops reperta (Bouvier, 1899)
- Dolops striata (Bouvier, 1899)
- Dolops tasmanianus Fryer, 1969
