= List of animal species introduced to the Hawaiian Islands =

This is a list of animal species introduced to the Hawaiian Islands, and that are currently still established.

== Amphibians ==
Primary source for this list is Nonindigenous Aquatic Species Database unless otherwise stated.

- Common coquí
- American bullfrog
- Cane toad
- Green and black poison dart frog
- Greenhouse frog
- Japanese wrinkled frog

== Arthropods ==
- Adoretus sinicus (Chinese rose beetle)
- Aedes albopictus (tiger mosquito)
- Aethina tumida (small hive beetle)
- Aleurotrachelus atratus (palm-infesting whitefly)
- Anoplolepis gracilipes (yellow crazy ant)
- Aphis spiraecola (Spirea aphid)
- Apis mellifera (Africanized bee)
- Argulus japonicus (Japanese fishlouse)
- Aulacaspis yasumatsui (cycad aulacaspis scale)
- Bactrocera cucurbitae (melon fly)
- Bactrocera dorsalis (oriental fruit fly)
- Bactrocera latifrons (solanaceous fruit fly)
- Blattella germanica (German cockroach)
- Cactoblastis cactorum (cactus moth)
- Callinectes sapidus (blue crab)
- Cerataphis lataniae (palm aphid)
- Ceratitis capitata (Mediterranean fruit fly)
- Chilo suppressalis (striped rice stem borer)
- Chthamalus proteus
- Coptotermes formosanus (Formosan subterranean termite)
- Cryptotermes brevis (powderpost termite)
- Culex quinquefasciatus (southern house mosquito)
- Darna pallivitta (nettle caterpillar)
- Drosophila suzukii (spotted wing drosophila)
- Elatobium abietinum (green spruce aphid)
- Epiphyas postvittana (light brown apple moth)
- Euwallacea fornicatus (tea shot-hole borer)
- Exomala orientalis (oriental beetle)
- Frankliniella occidentalis (western flower thrips)
- Glycaspis brimblecombei (red gum lerp psyllid)
- Homarus americanus (American lobster)
- Hypogeococcus pungens (cactus mealybug)
- Icerya purchasi (cottony cushion scale)
- Isometrus maculatus (lesser brown scorpion)
- Lernaea cyprinacea (anchor worm)
- Linepithema humile (Argentine ant)
- Litopenaeus vannamei (whiteleg shrimp)
- Maconellicoccus hirsutus (pink hibiscus mealybug)
- Macrobrachium lar (Tahitian prawn)
- Macrobrachium rosenbergii (giant river prawn)
- Monomorium pharaonis (pharaoh ant)
- Mythimna unipuncta (rice armyworm)
- Neocaridina davidi (cherry shrimp)
- Neolecanium cornuparvum (magnolia scale)
- Nesticella mogera (cave-dwelling spider)
- Opogona sacchari (banana moth)
- Oryctes rhinoceros (coconut rhinoceros beetle)
- Paratrechina longicornis (crazy ant)
- Pheidole megacephala (big-headed ant)
- Pineus pini (pine woolly aphid)
- Procambarus clarkii (red swamp crayfish)
- Pseudaulacaspis pentagona (mulberry scale)
- Pseudococcus viburni (obscure mealybug)
- Quadrastichus erythrinae (erythrina gall wasp)
- Schistocerca nitens (gray bird grasshopper)
- Sepedomerus macropus (liverfluke snail predator fly)
- Sepedon aenescens (snail-killing fly)
- Simosyrphus grandicornis (common hover fly)
- Solenopsis papuana (Papuan thief ant)
- Sophonia orientalis (two-spotted leafhopper)
- Tapinoma melanocephalum (ghost ant)
- Trichomyrmex destructor (Singapore ant)
- Varroa destructor (Varroa mite)
- Vespula pensylvanica (western yellowjacket)
- Wasmannia auropunctata (little fire ant)
- Xyleborinus saxesenii (fruit-tree pinhole borer)
- Xylocopa sonorina (Sonoran carpenter bee)
- Xylosandrus compactus (shot-hole borer)
- Xylosandrus crassiusculus (Asian ambrosia beetle)
- Xylosandrus germanus (black timber bark beetle)
- Xylosandrus morigerus (brown twig beetle)

== Mammals ==
- Wild pig
- Feral goat
- Chital deer
- Mule deer
- Cattle
- Sheep
- Ovis orientalis (mouflon)
- Feral cat
- Dog
- Small Asian mongoose
- Brown rat
- Black rat
- Pacific rat
- House mouse
- Brush-tailed rock-wallaby - small population on Oahu

== Reptiles ==
- Anolis sagrei (brown anole)
- Anolis carolinensis (Carolina anole)
- Chamaeleo calyptratus (veiled chameleon)
- Gehyra mutilata (four-clawed gecko)
- Hemidactylus frenatus (common House Gecko)
- Hemidactylus garnotii (Indo-Pacific gecko)
- Hemiphyllodactylus typus (Indopacific tree gecko)
- Iguana iguana (green Iguana)
- Lampropholis delicata (delicate skink)
- Lepidodactylus lugubris (mourning gecko)
- Phelsuma grandis (Madagascar giant day gecko)
- Phelsuma guimbeaui (Mauritius lowland forest day gecko)
- Phelsuma laticauda (gold dust day gecko)
- Trioceros jacksonii (Jackson's chameleon)
- Palea steindachneri (wattle-necked softshell turtle)
- Pelodiscus sinensis (Chinese softshell turtle)
- Trachemys scripta (red-eared slider)

== See also ==
- List of introduced species
