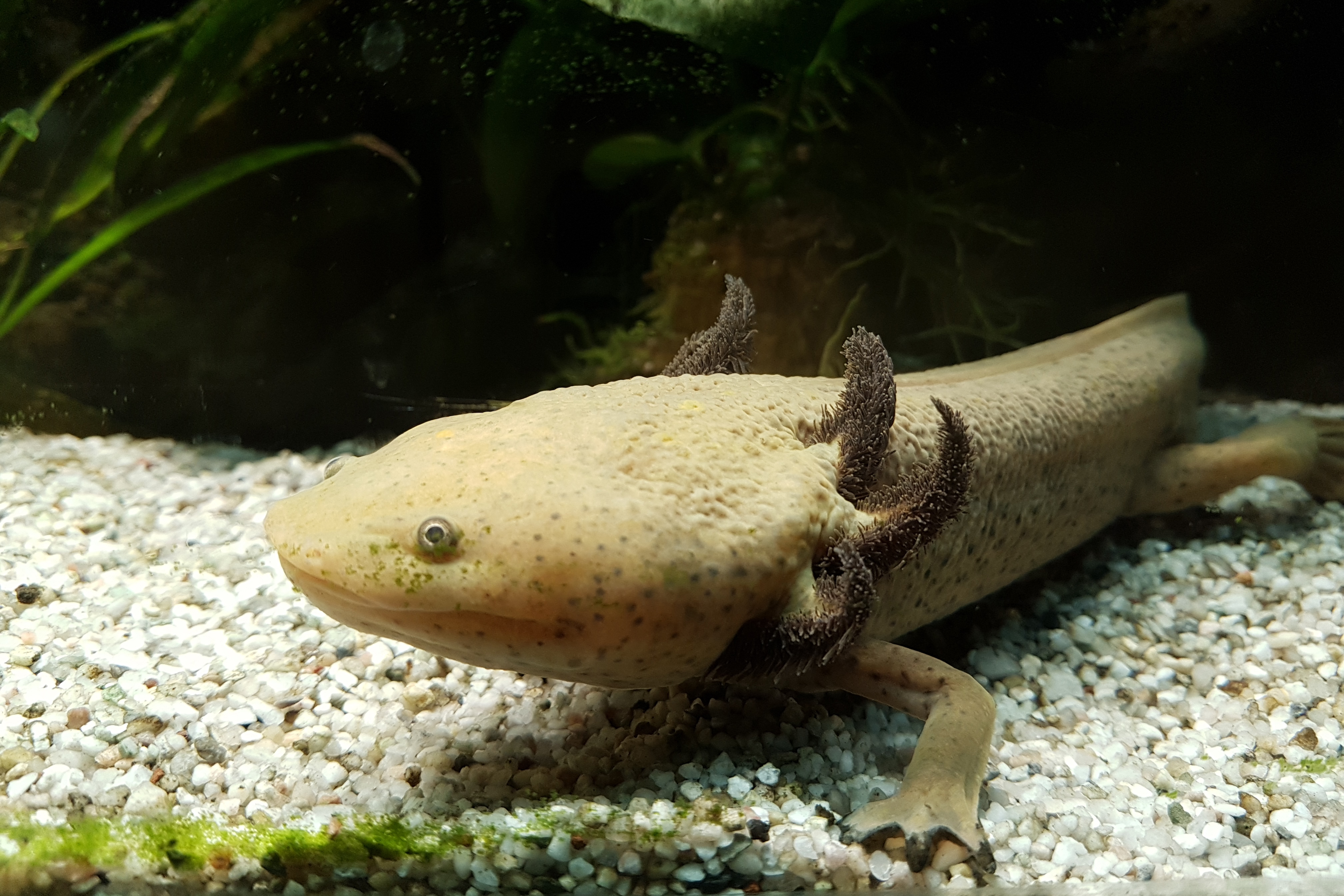

Conservation status
- Critically Endangered (IUCN 3.1)
- CITES Appendix II

Scientific classification
- Kingdom: Animalia
- Phylum: Chordata
- Class: Amphibia
- Order: Urodela
- Family: Ambystomatidae
- Genus: Ambystoma
- Species: A. dumerilii

Binomial name
- Ambystoma dumerilii (Dugès, 1870)

Synonyms
- Siredon dumerilii (Dugès, 1870); Bathysiredon dumerilii (Emmett Reid Dunn, 1939)

= Lake Patzcuaro salamander =

Species of amphibian

The Lake Patzcuaro salamander, locally known as achoque (Ambystoma dumerilii), is a paedomorphic species of salamander found exclusively in Lake Pátzcuaro, a high-altitude lake in the Mexican state of Michoacán. First described in 1870 by Alfredo Dugès, the species is named in honor of the French herpetologist Auguste Duméril. However, the salamander has been used as a food source and an ingredient in traditional medicines by the Purépecha people since the Pre-Columbian era. Ambystoma dumerilii are neotenic, meaning they retain their larval characteristics throughout their entire life. This results in adults that have long, heavily filamented external gills, gill slits lined with tooth-like gill rakers, and caudal fins. When stressed, Ambystoma dumerilii can undergo an incomplete metamorphosis, though this is process significantly decreases their lifespan and is often fatal.

Due to their similar morphology, taxonomy, and behavior, achoques are often compared to axolotls. While geographically isolated in the wild, achoques and axolotls are capable of mating in captivity. This, along with achoque's similarities to the tiger salamander, has led to the species being classified as a member of the larger Ambystoma tigrinum species group.

Ambystoma dumerilii are listed as critically endangered in the IUCN red list, and in Appendix II CITES due to pollution, overfishing, eutrophication, and invasive species. It is estimated that there are less than 100 individuals left in the wild, and that the species may go extinct in the wild within the next 20 to 30 years. Currently, there are 4 in situ colonies in Mexico and additional colonies abroad maintaining the species' population. The most notable of these is run by Sisters of the Dominican Order, at the Basílica de Nuestra Señora de la Salud, who currently maintain a colony of 300 members, the largest known population of the species in the world.

== Taxonomy and evolution ==
Ambystoma dumerilii is a species of mole salamander located in the suborder Salamandroidea, also known as advanced salamanders. The species was first described in 1870 by Alfredo Dugès, who described the species as Siredon dumerilii. The species epithet "dumerilii" is in honor of the French herpetologist Auguste Duméril. In 1889, Edward Drinker Cope reclassified the species as Amblystoma dumerili, with the classification being upheld in 1930 by Karl Lafrentz. Emmett Reid Dunn renamed the species Bathysiredon dumerilii in 1939, and Hobart Muir Smith employed the name Siredon dumerilii that same year. Between 1943 and 1948, Hobart M Smith, Walter Necker, and Edward Harrison Taylor returned the species to Bathysiredon dumerilii, but incorrectly claimed the species had gone extinct. Also, in 1948, Manuel Maldonado Koerdell described the subspecies Bathysiredon dumerilii queretarensis and Bathysiredon dumerilii dumerilii. A 2016 review of this classification concluded that the holotype specimen had been lost, making confirmation of Koerdell's discovery impossible. Previous assessments of the preserved specimen prior to it being lost concluded that the subspecies was not taxonomically valid.

In 1958, Joseph Anton Tihen classified the species as Ambystoma (Bathysiredon) dumerilii. In 1976, Hobart M Smith, and Rozella B. Smith reclassified the species again as Ambystoma queretarense but this was rejected in 1992 by Southern Illinois University herpetologist Ronald A. Brandon. In 1984, H. Bradley Shaffer conducted breeding experiments and genetic distance reviews of the Ambystoma genus, identifying Ambystoma dumerilii as part of the larger Ambystoma tigrinum species group. In 2012, the species was lastly reclassified to its current name Ambystoma (Heterotriton) dumerilii by Alain Dubois and Jean Raffaëlli.

The following cladogram shows the phylogenetic position of Ambystoma dumerilii among select members of the genus Ambystoma, based upon genetic distance comparisons of 32 loci via gel electrophoresis: (Note: Because many of these species are located within the Ambystoma tigrinum species group, only the relative position of Ambystoma tigrinum to Ambystoma dumerilii is shown to avoid redundancy. Ambystoma mexicanum and Ambystoma tigrinum are also closely related.)

- Ambystoma
  - Ambystoma mexicanum
  - - - - Ambystoma amblycephalum
        - Ambystoma dumerilii
      - - - Ambystoma flavipiperatum
          - Ambystoma tigrinum

Ambystoma dumerilii are colloquially referred to as the Lake Patzcuaro Salamander, Dumeril's salamander, and are locally called achoques. The vernacular name achoque is derived from the Purépecha word "achójki". The term is synonymous with the Nahuatl word "axolotl", or the Spanish "Ajolote", which is broadly applied to all aquatic forms of branchiate salamanders. The precise meaning of "achójki" is not known, but it might mean mud.

=== Evolution ===
Ambystoma dumerilii evolved approximately 10 to 12 million years ago during the Neogene era. The Ambystoma genus diverged following the uplifting of the Trans-Mexican Volcanic Belt where the Mexican Plateau split from the Sierra Madre, isolating the ancestral species. From there, species along the Mexican Plateau split into 3 distinct lineages based upon the plateau's drainage patterns. During that same time, the Lerma River's drainage system was disrupted by volcanic activity, separating Lake Patzcuaro and Lake Texcoco, and isolating the ancestral species of Ambystoma dumerilii and axolotls into their respective environments. The maintenance of the Ambystoma tigrinum species group might be facilitated by changes in groundwater levels that periodically connect the geographically isolated members of this species group, preventing complete speciation.

== Description ==
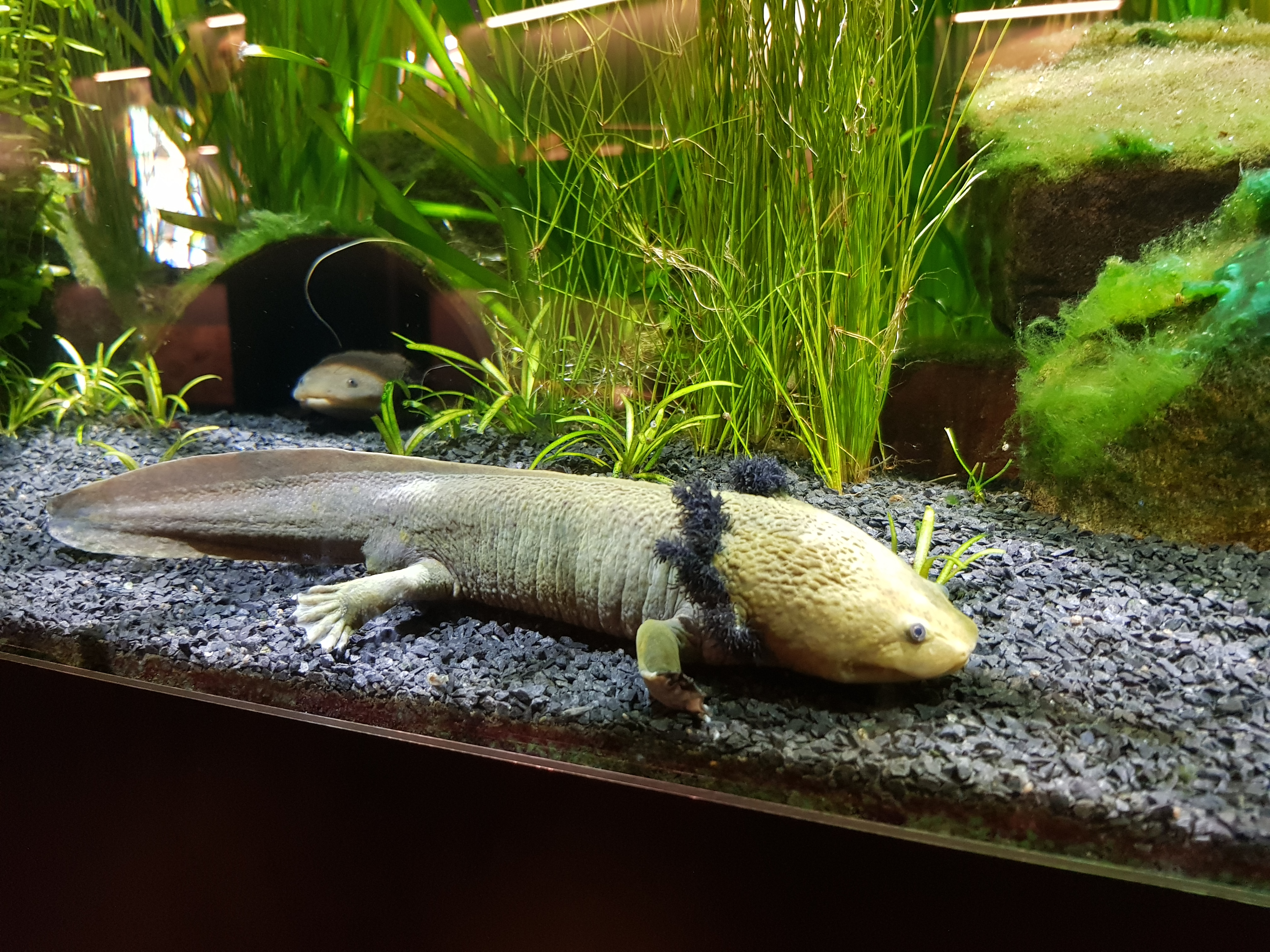
An adult specimen located at the Wilhelmshaven Aquarium in Germany

Ambystoma dumerilii are large, ectothermic salamanders; adult specimen have a snout to vent length of 12.2 cm (4.8 in) and a size range of 12.8 cm (5.0 in) to 28.2 cm (11.1 in). Males and females are identical lengths. Some adults have been observed growing over 35 cm (14 in) in length; this places achoques as one of the largest species in their genus. The average adult weight is 121 g (0.267 lb) and females typically weigh more than males. The salamander's skin has a granular to smooth texture, with small dome-shaped protuberances along the head. Their dorsum can range from tan brown to green, sometimes with dark brown spots, while their undersides are a pale grey. Their toes, rostrum of the head, cloaca, and underside of the tail tend to have a darker coloring compared to the body. Rarely, the dorsum can be darker in males, and the fimbriae of the gills are most often red colored. Their dorsum color has been described by Chester Zoo curator Gerardo Garcia as "the color of dijon mustard" and the salamanders "resemble miniature versions of the flying dragon-dog Falkor in The Neverending Story".

Ambystoma dumerilii's head and mouth are flat and wide, and a caudal fin runs from the third gill arch to the end of the tail. This species also retains its gill rakers, and possess large, perennibranchiate (lifelong), hyperfilamentous gills that frame their head. The eyes are small and located near the snout. Their bodies are widest along the thorax and begin to taper following the hind legs into the tail. The legs are short and stocky, and their webbed toes end with four digits. Ambystoma dumerilii is the only member of their genus to retain webbed feet on all 4 limbs into adulthood. Morphologically, they are most similar to Anderson's salamander, with both species sharing a broad head and equal gill raker numbers. Achoques are also compared to the axolotl and Taylor's salamander since all three species share a similar geographical location, taxonomic ranking, and have broadly similar morphological features. Compared to most Ambystoma species, their heads and rostrum are particularly flat. Additionally, their gills have a larger number of fimbriae but fewer gill rakers.

== Life cycle ==
Mating occurs in winter and early spring. Unlike other species of tropical salamanders who continually produce gametes, Ambystoma dumerilii spermatogenesis follows a yearly cycle. Males initiate courtship by arching the base of their tails and swimming around the female; they lift their tails further to present their cloaca. If the female is receptive, she will begin to follow the male to a breeding site, where males release up to 16 spermatophores. Oviposition takes approximately 24 to 72 hours to complete, and individual eggs are attached to vegetation or rocks. Females can lay over 1000 eggs in a single clutch and eggs can measure up to 1.8 mm (0.071 in) in diameter. Ova begin maturation during the spring's rainy season and spawning occurs in response to increasing seasonal temperatures.

The life stages of Ambystoma dumerilii are largely defined by overall body length and the loss of some, but not all, larval features. Newly hatched salamanders measure approximately 12 mm (0.47 in) in length.They lack ectodermal projections (balancers) and gill fimbriae, are a brown colour, and have developing front limbs. When larvae reach a 35 mm (1.4 in) snout to vent length, they have all limbs developed, hyperfilamentous gills, and have begun developing dark pigmentation. They largely retain their current features into maturity. Stressors in the environment can induce morphological plasticity in larvae, which determines the length, width, and degree of tail development. When raised in captivity or under stressful conditions, specimen are generally smaller and have decreased swimming capabilities.

Sexual maturity is reached around 18 to 24 months of age, though some specimen can achieve this as early as 8 to 12 months. A snout to vent length of 108 mm (4.3 in) marks the beginning of sexual maturation while a snout to vent length of 122 mm (4.8 in) is considered sexually mature. Males tend to mature faster than females and can be identified by the swelling in their cloaca during breeding season. Females may be capable of reproducing earlier than this, but most of the resultant eggs would not be viable. The life expectancy of this species is unknown but captive specimen can survive up to 16 years.

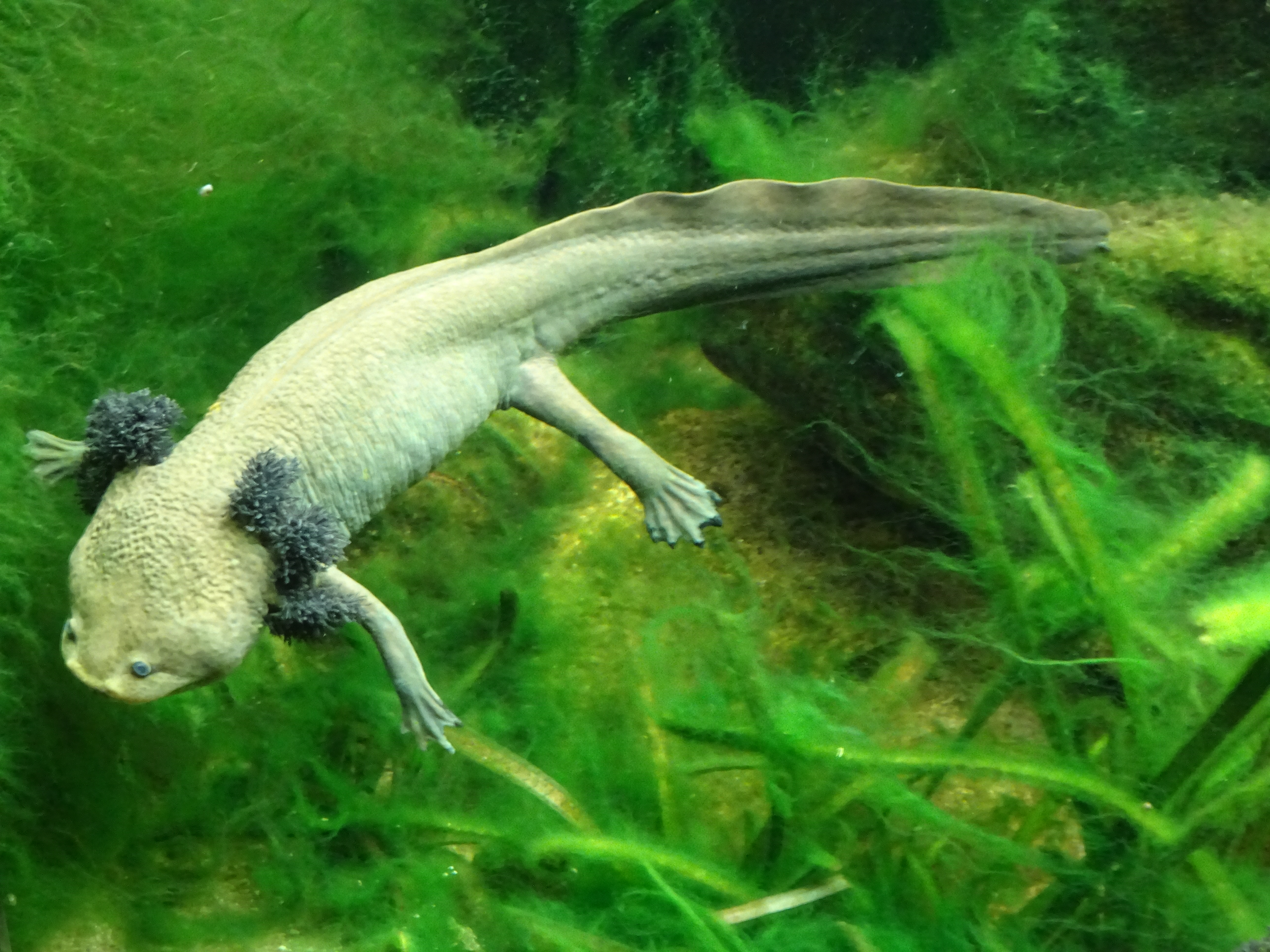
Ambystoma dumerilii at the London Zoo, note the external gills and webbed feet.

=== Neoteny ===
This species is neotenic (also known as paedomorphism), meaning that they retain larval stage characteristics. This mainly includes their external, heavily vascularized gills, rather than losing them in adulthood like most salamander species. While many Ambystoma salamanders are capable of performing facilitative neoteny (entering metamorphosis only under favorable environmental conditions), Ambystoma dumerilii is only one of five Ambystoma salamanders that are found in a permanent, natural state of paedomorphism. As a result, while the species possesses functional, terrestrial lungs, most gas exchange occurs via their gills and skin.

=== Metamorphosis ===
A. dumerilii has not been observed metamorphosing in the wild, but can undergo metamorphosis in captivity. Approximately, one third of both wild caught and laboratory raised specimen undergo metamorphosis in a laboratory setting, and spontaneous metamorphoses often occur during mating season possibly due to hormonal factors. The metamorphosis is largely incomplete and can take up to 3 years. Incorrect husbandry practices are a source of stress in achoques in captivity and may be another driving factor in spontaneous metamorphosis. Metamorphosed specimen do not undergo periodic molting, but rather continuously shed the stratum corneum. Unlike normal amphibians post-transformation, the skin does not have Leydig nor mucosal cells.

Induction of metamorphosis via thyroxine shortens the lifespan of the salamander to 48 days from the start of metamorphosis, while non-induced spontaneous metamorphosis shortens lifespan to 5 months. These specimen will refuse to eat and require assisted feeding to survive. Hybrids between A. dumerilii and its relatives, often A. mexicanum (the axolotl) and A. tigrinum (the tiger salamander), are also prone to spontaneous metamorphosis but show a stronger tolerance to survival. This is because Ambystoma dumerilii lacks the genes necessary to carry out metamorphosis to completion, often leading to detrimental phenotypes, bodily asymmetry, and ultimately death.

=== Hybridization ===
Ambystoma mexicanum, Ambystoma tigrinum, and Ambystoma dumerilii all display similar courtship behavior, and both artificial insemination and inter-species courtship under laboratory conditions has resulted in viable hybrid offspring between these species. Ambystoma mexicanum and Ambystoma dumerilii, in particular, demonstrate no behavioral nor genetic barriers to reproduction in captivity. Their offspring tend to be larger than axolotl larvae and their adult size is largely dependent on the maternal species. Pigmentation and the morphology of the hybrid larvae are largely consistent with the tiger salamander's larvae, another member of the species group. As hybrids age, they develop a phenotype that is a combination of achoques and axolotls. Hybrids retain the webbed feet but lack the dorsal fimbriae of achoques. Offspring involving Ambystoma tigrinum or A. tigrinum-A. mexicanum hybrids and Ambystoma dumerilii results in few viable offspring that are prone to congenital abnormalities. Hybridization between achoques and Ambystoma rivulare has also been achieved via artificial insemination.

== Behavior and ecology ==
Due to the species' rarity in the wild, most observations regarding their behavior have been made in captivity. Ambystoma dumerilii is nocturnal, but will engage in opportunistic activities during the day. Movement is driven via a 'walking' motion through substrate and the tail fin is used for swimming when necessary. In their lungs, they regulate the amount of air to control buoyancy. When startled or attempting to swim, the salamanders pull their limbs to their body and dive down. They will then hide in vegetation or substrate. Similar to axolotls, achoques are capable of limb regeneration following injury. Ambystoma dumerilii does not normally vocalize but do make a croaking or squeaking sound when removed from water.

Due to the lack of native predatory fish in Lake Pátzcuaro, Ambystoma dumerilii was likely an apex predator prior to the introduction of invasive species. They may have been predated on by herons and the snake Thamnophis eques patzcuarensis, but this has never been observed. Ambystoma dumerilii is naturally paracitized by the fish lice Argulus ambystoma and the nematode Posthodiplostomum minimum which are found on the salamander's skin and gills. It is unknown if this relationship poses any harm to achoques.

=== Diet ===
Ambystoma dumerilii feeds by the use of gill rakers which they use to form a sucking motion to pull in food. This is achieved via water being pushed through the buccal cavity and out the gills, trapping prey in the mouth. Juveniles and adults largely rely on smell to locate food and identify prey based upon movement. They can often be seen standing on their forelegs and sweeping their snouts through substrate to find prey. In captivity, Ambystoma dumerilii are generalist carnivores who commonly eat aquatic invertebrates, small fish, and eggs. They are often fed beef liver by husbandry projects.

In the wild, Ambystoma dumerilii shows trophic specialization towards consuming the crustacean Cambarellus patzcuarensis, and wild-caught specimen will refuse other foods when offered. They will often consume plant matter and algae, but this is most often incidentally consumed and provides little nutritional value. Larvae predominately consume small invertebrates in large quantities, but have been observed engaging in cannibalism.

=== Interactions with invasive species ===
An invasive hyacinth species along Lake Pátzcuaro is a source of toxic metabolites detrimental to the salamander's health. Between the 1930s and 1970s, Oreochromis aureus, Cyprinus carpio (Carp), Micropterus salmoides (Largemouth bass), and Ctenopharyngodon idella were intentionally released into Lake Pátzcuaro; all of these fish predate on the eggs and larvae of achoques. Carp directly compete with achoques for Cambarellus patzcuarensis. Achoques have shown an ability to coexist with largemouth bass, a rarity amongst the Ambystoma genus. This indicates that the macronutrient competition between this species and achoques is limited, and both species could potentially survive in the same environment.

The introduction of these fish species also introduced a number of parasitic species from the Lerneae genus (namely Lernea cyprinacea) into the environment. These parasites colonize the gills of achoques, but their health impacts remain unknown. Fungus species endemic to the Old World also pose a risk to salamander's health. In particular, the fungus Batrachochytrium dendrobatidis can infect achoques and has caused concern that the species may be susceptible to chytridiomycosis.

== Distribution and threats ==
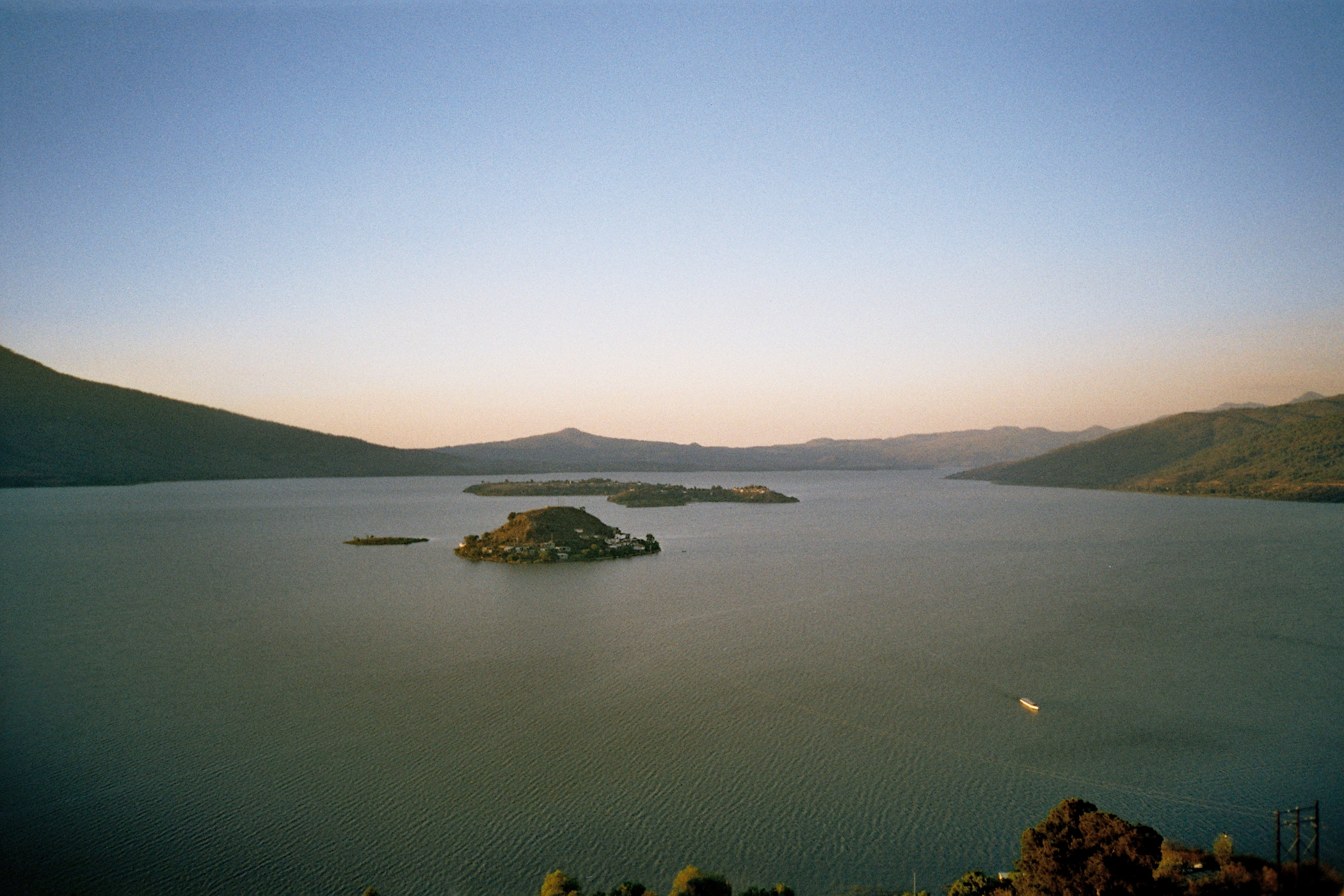
Lake Pátzcuaro, the only location Ambystoma dumerilii is endemic to.

Ambystoma dumerilii is microendemic to Lake Pátzcuaro, a high-altitude lake (1,920 m (6,300 ft) in elevation) in the Mexican state of Michoacán. Lake Pátzcuaro is an alkaline (pH 8.1 to 9.6) freshwater lake with a maximum historic depth of 11 m (36 ft). This is located in the Mesa Central Plateau, the exclusive home to many Ambystoma species. The last known wild population of achoques is located at the northern end of Lake Pátzcuaro. The salamanders are most commonly found near the islands of La Pacanda and Tzitzipandácuri, and less commonly near La Ortiga and Santa Cruz Uricho. The surrounding vegetation to Ambystoma dumerilii's habitat include oyamel forests, pine-oak forests, oak forests, and subtropical shrubs. There have been claims that a subspecies is found further inland to the north-east in San Juan del Río, Querétaro, but this has largely been dismissed as inaccurate.

While the exact location and number of achoques is unknown, the current extent of occurrence is estimated at under than 100 km^{2}. Fishermen in 2021 reported that they were still finding juvenile specimen in their nets. This means that there exists a reproducing population in the wild, but the current health and survival rates of these larvae remains unknown. In 2018, National Geographic estimated that there may be fewer than 100 individuals left in the wild and that the species could go completely extinct in the wild by 2040 to 2050. This species is listed as critically endangered in the IUCN red list, in Appendix II CITES, and is classified as a protected species (category PR) by the Mexico's Secretariat of Environment and Natural Resources. Despite this, no protective measures have been implemented by the Mexican government for the species or Lake Pátzcuaro.

=== Habitat loss ===
Due to habitat destruction and pollution resultant of the rising human population of Pátzcuaro, a city located on Lake Pátzcuaro, the achoque population has decreased severely in the past decades. Lake Pátzcuaro is part of a larger basin, which makes the lake the final source for any runoff produced by the surrounding villages. Silt, fertilizer, sewage, cow waste, and pollutant runoff, exacerbated by local deforestation, have negatively impacted water quality and resulted in eutrophication of the lake. Additionally, between 1982 and 2010, Lake Pátzcuaro lost a quarter of its total volume and water temperatures have significantly increased, further limiting the salamander's habitat. This is the result of siltation which has decreased the lake's depth by an estimated 2.6 m (8.5 ft). Efforts to rehabilitate the environment throughout the 1990s and 2000s were unsuccessful.

=== Human interactions ===
Historically, fishermen have been harvesting Ambystoma dumerilii since the Pre-Columbian era. The Purépecha people consumed achoques and often used them in traditional medicine. This medicine, often called 'Achoque soup', has been claimed to cure respiratory illnesses, cure anemia, give energy to children, and was often given to lactating women. Achoques were widely harvested throughout the 1970s and early 1980s until Lake Pátzcuaro's conditions deteriorated to the point at which their population crashed in 1989. Between 1987 and 2000, fishermen reported their harvests in kilograms per year, but official reporting of wild catches ceased being reported in 2000 due to population decline. In 2004, fishermen reported that due to overfishing, they were only able to catch small specimen.

Ambystoma dumerilii is subject to illegal pet trading.

== Conservation efforts ==
There exist four local in situ breeding colonies, designed to prevent extinction. Two of these colonies are for species conservation, one is designated for educational purposes, and one is for commercial purposes. EAZA and the North American Association of Zoos and Aquariums also maintain populations abroad.

=== Basílica de Nuestra Señora de la Salud ===
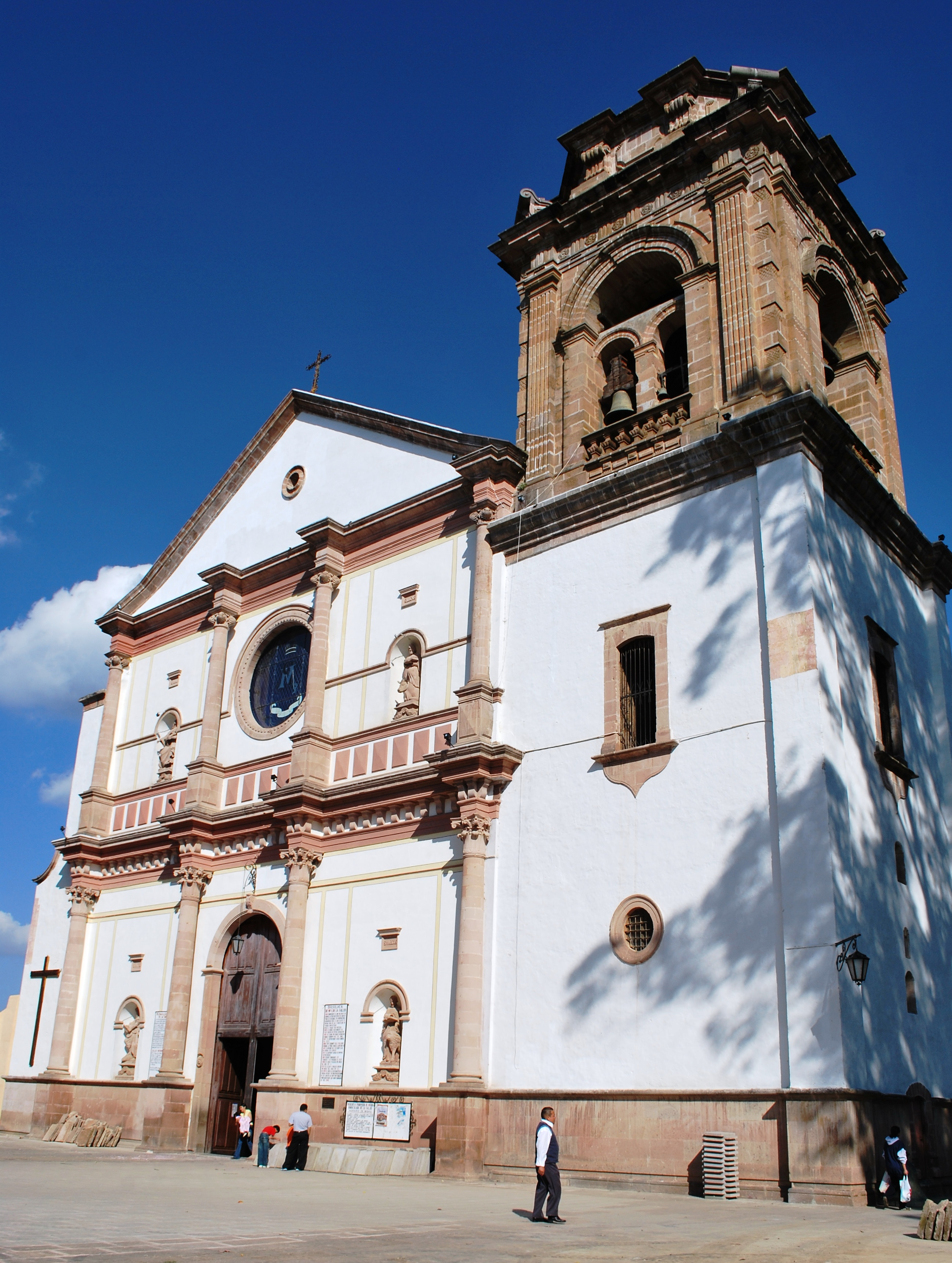
Facade of the Bascilica de Nuestra Señora de la Salud in Patzcuaro, Michoacan

The most notable of the in-situ colonies is run by the Sisters of the Dominican Order, at the Basílica de Nuestra Señora de la Salud in Pátzcuaro. This colony is run in partnership with the Chester Zoo and Michoacan University. The Sisters have harvested Ambystoma dumerilii for use in traditional medicine for 150 years, using the salamader's skin in the production of "jarabe", a cough syrup. The origin of the recipe is unknown but possibly originates from the Purépecha. While there are other captive colonies throughout Pátzcuaro and Mexico, the monastery's colony is currently the largest known population of the species. Originally, the Sisters made syrup from achoque in Lake Pátzcuaro, but following the population's decline in the 1985, the Sisters established a colony to maintain their jarabe business and protect the species. By 2000, the colony was made self-sustaining through captive breeding efforts. As of 2018, the captive population is estimated to be approximately 300 specimens in two rooms, with a capacity to house 400 specimens at a time. The captively breed salamanders are measured, microchipped and paired for breeding by the Sisters.

Chester Zoo and Michoacan University also maintain colonies of Ambystoma dumerilii, but the population at the convent is considered the most viable since it is closest to the achoque's native habitat and the salamanders are thus less likely to be exposed to foreign pathogens. Additionally, the current wild population has limited genetic diversity due to population bottlenecking, but the convent's population is believed by the Chester Zoo to have sufficient genetic diversity to reestablish a wild population. This reintroduction, however, is limited due to the relatively poor water quality of Lake Pátzcuaro.

=== Michoacan University and others ===
Michoacan University's Laboratory of Aquatic Biology in Morelia City, Mexico maintains a colony at their campus. Research on the species focuses on captive management, Ambystoma dumerilii's genetics, reproduction, and environmental education. As of 2021, the university's colony is made up of 10 breeding adults. Additionally, the university engages in outreach programs to increase awareness for the species, including murals, radio broadcasts, and touring exhibitions. Michoacan University also partners with, and provides specimen to the two other in-situ colonies. The Centro Regional de Investigaciones Pesqueras Pátzcuaro and Gerardo León Murillo colonies focus on aquaculture research and educational programs, respectively, to reestablish populations of Ambystoma dumerilii for human consumption and medical use.

== See also ==
- Decline in amphibian populations
