= Āulu =

Āulu is a Hawaiian name for several species of tree found in mesic forests:

- Pisonia sandwicensis, a four o'clock
- Planchonella sandwicensis (also ʻĀlaʻa / ʻĒlaʻa), a sapote
- Sapindus oahuensis (also Lonomea), a soapberry
