= Argulus ambystoma =

Scientific classification
- Domain: Eukaryota
- Kingdom: Animalia
- Phylum: Arthropoda
- Class: Ichthyostraca
- Order: Arguloida
- Family: Argulidae
- Genus: Argulus
- Species: A. ambystoma

Binomial name
- Argulus ambystoma Poly, 2003

Species of crustacean

Argulus ambystoma is a species of branchiuran parasitic on Lake Patzcuaro salamanders, sharing that species' very limited range in Lago de Pátzcuaro, Mexico.

The male has a total length of 3–4 mm with 2 dark triangular marks on the dorsal surface of the carapace and large dark patches marking the location of the testes. The larger (4–6 mm) female is generally mottled without large dark areas. It lives among the external gills of its neotenous host, only occasionally straying from this hiding place during darkness. This retiring nature may explain why this animal remained undiscovered until recently.
