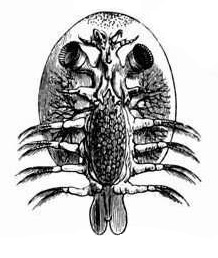

Scientific classification
- Kingdom: Animalia
- Phylum: Arthropoda
- Class: Ichthyostraca
- Order: Arguloida
- Family: Argulidae
- Genus: Argulus
- Species: A. foliaceus

Binomial name
- Argulus foliaceus (Linnaeus, 1758)

Synonyms
- Monoculus foliaceus Linnaeus, 1758

= Argulus foliaceus =

Species of crustacean

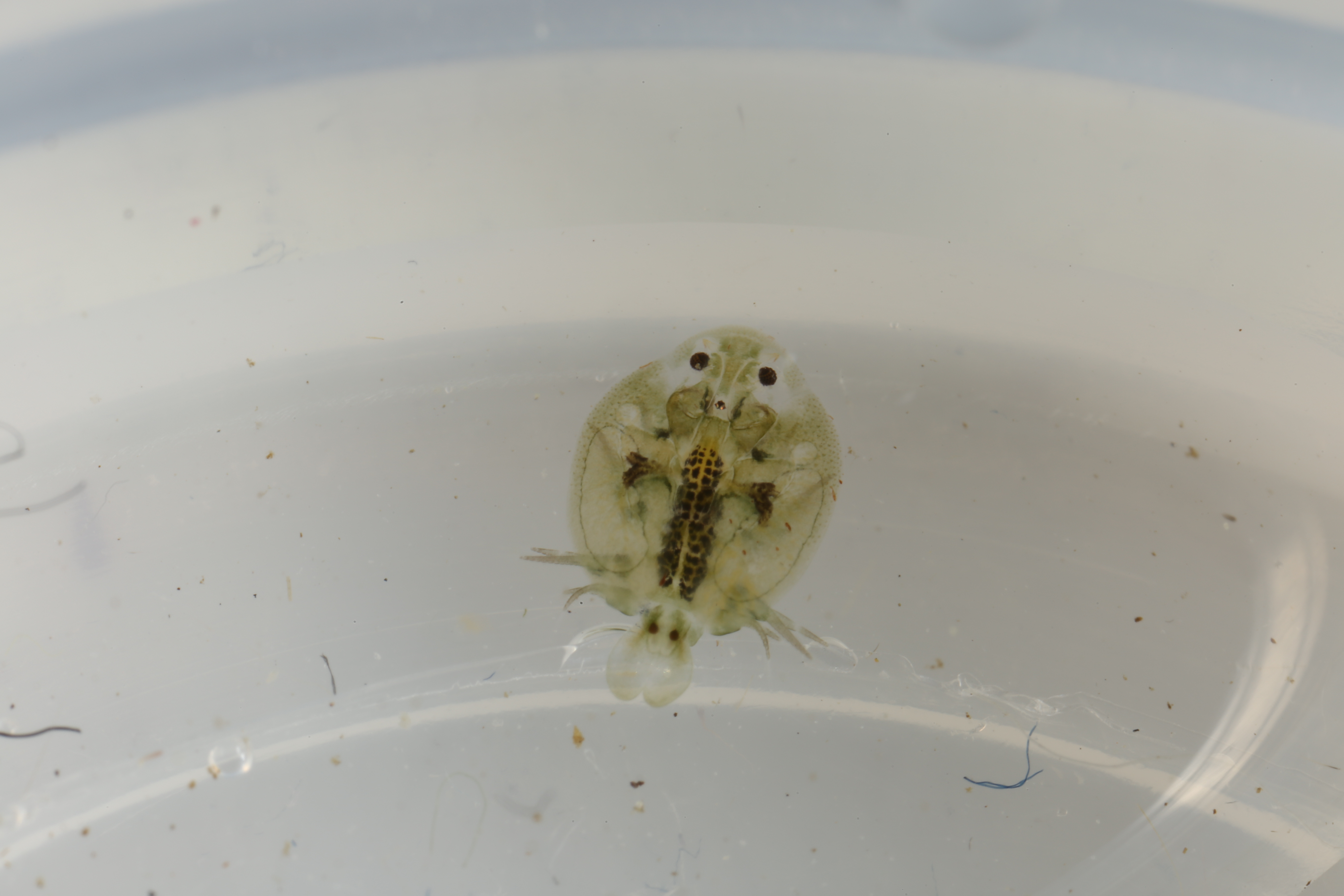
Argulus foliaceus

Argulus foliaceus, also known as the common fish louse, is a species of fish lice in the family Argulidae. It is "the most common and widespread native argulid in the Palaearctic" and "one of the most widespread crustacean ectoparasites of freshwater fish in the world", considering its distribution and range of hosts. It can cause the severe disease state argulosis in a wide variety of fish species. It is responsible for epizootic outbreaks that have led to the collapse of aquaculture operations. Fish lice are not related to lice, which are insects.

== Description ==
A typical fish louse of the genus Argulus is very flat with an oval or rounded carapace, two compound eyes, sucking mouthparts with a piercing stylet, and two suction cups it uses to attach to its host. These "suctorial organs" are the first of its two pairs of maxillae, modified in shape. Its paired appendages have hooks and spines, and are used for swimming. A. foliaceus in particular is up to 7 millimeters long by 5 millimeters wide. The female is larger than the male and has a visible pair of spermathecae on its posterior end, in which the male deposits sperm.

== Life cycle ==
The common fish louse lives in marine, brackish, and freshwater environments. All life stages of both sexes are parasitic. It attaches to its host, usually a fish, via its suction cups, pierces the skin with its sharp stylet, and feeds on blood. It may live in the gills. A heavy infestation causes inflammation of the skin, open hemorrhaging wounds, increased production of mucus, loss of scales, and corrosion of the fins. The wounds are often infected with bacteria and fungi, which further degrade the skin layers. The fish can become anemic. During feeding, the louse also injects digestive enzymes into the flesh. Infested fish may exhibit loss of appetite and slowed growth, and behavioral signs such as erratic swimming and rubbing up against aquarium walls. The damage and infection cause stress and mortality.

The common fish louse is also a vector for pathogens, introducing organisms such as bacteria, flagellates, and the virus that causes spring viraemia of carp. It is an intermediate host to nematodes of the family Skrjabillanidae.

To locate its host, the fish louse uses vision, olfaction, and mechanical sensation. During light hours it searches visually for a host, usually remaining still in ambush. When it is dark the louse is more active, swimming about to encounter a host. It senses the smell of the fish and the movement of the water around it. It also becomes more active in searching when it has not fed in over 24 hours.

During the reproductive cycle, the male and female fish louse copulate upon the body of the host, and the female detaches every few days to swim to the substrate and lay eggs. It favors hard strata, and its eggs can be collected by providing it with a wooden board to lay them on. It lays more clutches during daylight hours than at night.

The larva of the fish louse has two main stages. In its newly hatched stage it has been termed a "metanauplius", like the nauplius of many other crustaceans, but with a swimming apparatus that is more developed. It may even be too well developed for the larva to be called a nauplius at all. The newly hatched larva can parasitize a host, attaching to it with its hooked antennae because it lacks suction cups. A second function of its hook-lined antennae is an apparent grooming behavior, in which it drags the antennae across the setae of its swimming legs to dislodge debris. In the second main stage, after its first molt, it is simply called a "juvenile", because it is very similar to the adult, only smaller. It can swim just as efficiently as the adult. The larva molts eleven times before reaching adulthood.

== Hosts ==
This parasite "has been recorded from practically every freshwater fish species within its natural range". Food and sport fish and other commercially important species parasitized include carp and minnows such as goldfish and koi, members of the sunfish family, and salmonids such as salmon and trout. Hosts include blue bream (Ballerus ballerus), silver bream (Blicca bjoerkna), European eel (Anguilla anguilla), northern pike (Esox lucius), three-spined stickleback (Gasterosteus aculeatus), pumpkinseed (Lepomis gibbosus), ide (Leuciscus idus), abu mullet (Liza abu), European perch (Perca fluviatilis), common roach (Rutilus rutilus), common rudd (Scardinius erythropthalmus), wels catfish (Silurus glanis), zander (Sander lucioperca), tench (Tinca tinca), and Atlantic horse mackerel (Trachurus trachurus).

While it is a generalist parasite not specific to a host taxon, it does display preferences, apparently preferring larger and heavier fish over smaller, and certain species over others when given a choice.

It has also been observed on frogs and toads.

== Impacts ==
Heavy infestations in fish stocks can lead to large-scale losses. Major outbreaks in rainbow trout fisheries in the United Kingdom have resulted in total losses. Carp aquaculture in Russia has experienced infestations in which fish were coated in "several hundred" parasites before dying. Parasites infested 100% of the fish in a sample at a stricken carp farm in Turkey, with up to 1000 fish lice per individual.

The fish louse will readily lay its eggs on hard objects such as wooden boards, and these can be removed from the water to reduce the egg load in the fishery. A short bath in a sodium chloride solution can reduce the parasite load on a fish, but this treatment must be done carefully, because too short a duration or too dilute a solution is ineffective, while too long or too concentrated a bath can harm the fish.
