= Adoretus abdolrezagharibi =

Scientific classification
- Kingdom: Animalia
- Phylum: Arthropoda
- Clade: Pancrustacea
- Class: Insecta
- Order: Coleoptera
- Suborder: Polyphaga
- Infraorder: Scarabaeiformia
- Family: Scarabaeidae
- Genus: Adoretus
- Species: A. abdolrezagharibi

Binomial name
- Adoretus abdolrezagharibi Petrovitz, 1980

Species of beetle

Adoretus abdolrezagharibi is a scarab beetle, and a member of the genus Adoretus.

== Range ==
The species is listed in the check-list of Iranian Coleoptera.
