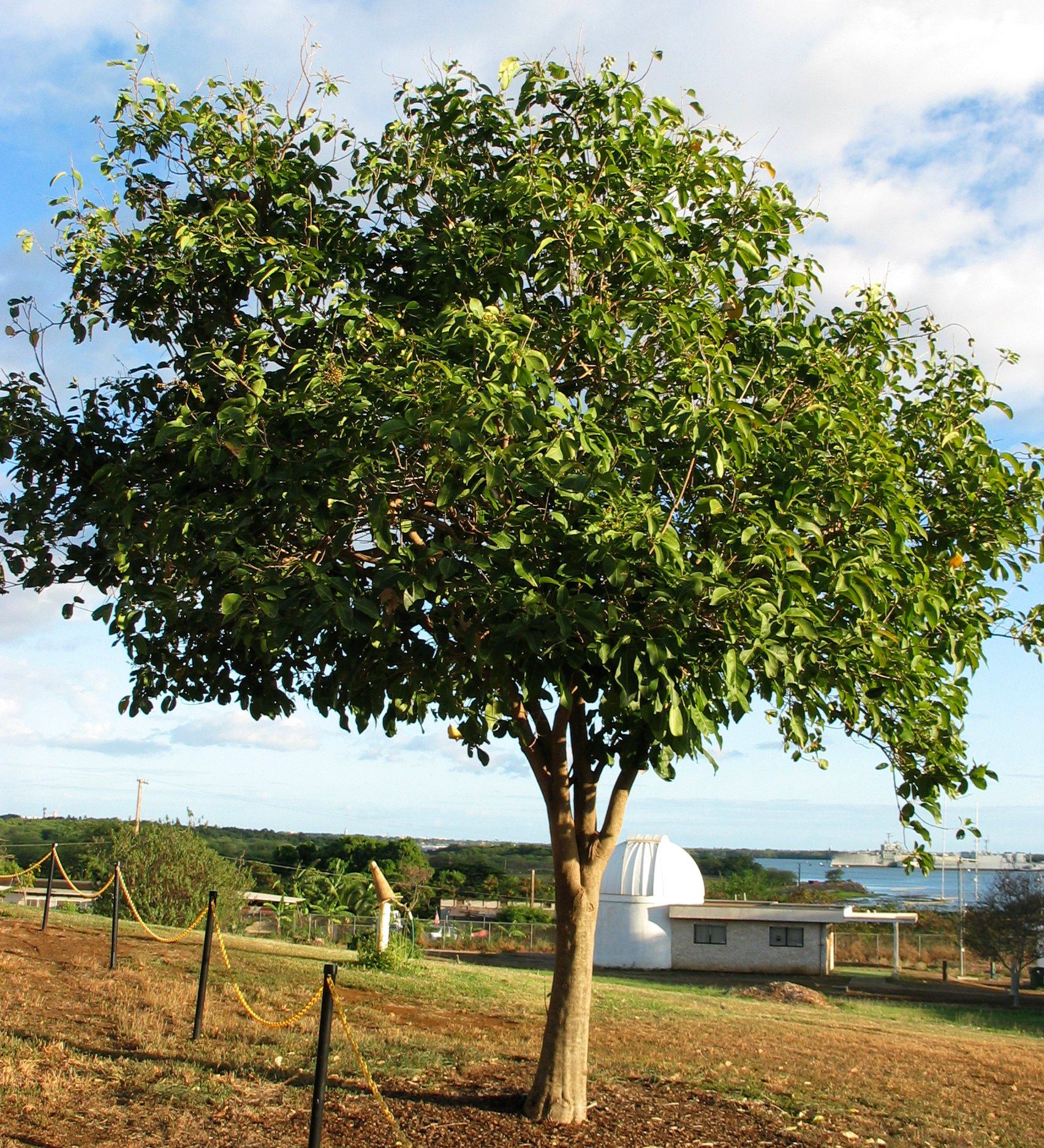

Conservation status
- Vulnerable (IUCN 3.1)

- Imperiled (NatureServe)

Scientific classification
- Kingdom: Plantae
- Clade: Tracheophytes
- Clade: Angiosperms
- Clade: Eudicots
- Clade: Rosids
- Order: Sapindales
- Family: Sapindaceae
- Genus: Sapindus
- Species: S. oahuensis

Binomial name
- Sapindus oahuensis Hillebr. ex Radlk.

Synonyms
- Sapindus lonomea H.St.John

= Sapindus oahuensis =

Species of tree

Sapindus oahuensis is a species of tree in the soapberry family, Sapindaceae. It is endemic to Hawaii, where it is limited to Kauaʻi (Waimea Canyon) and Oʻahu (Waiʻanae and Koʻolau Ranges). Its common names include Āulu, Oahu soapberry, alulu, kaulu, and lonomea. It can be found in dry and moist forest habitat at elevations of 200 to 2,000 feet (60 to 610 m).

== Anatomy and morphology ==
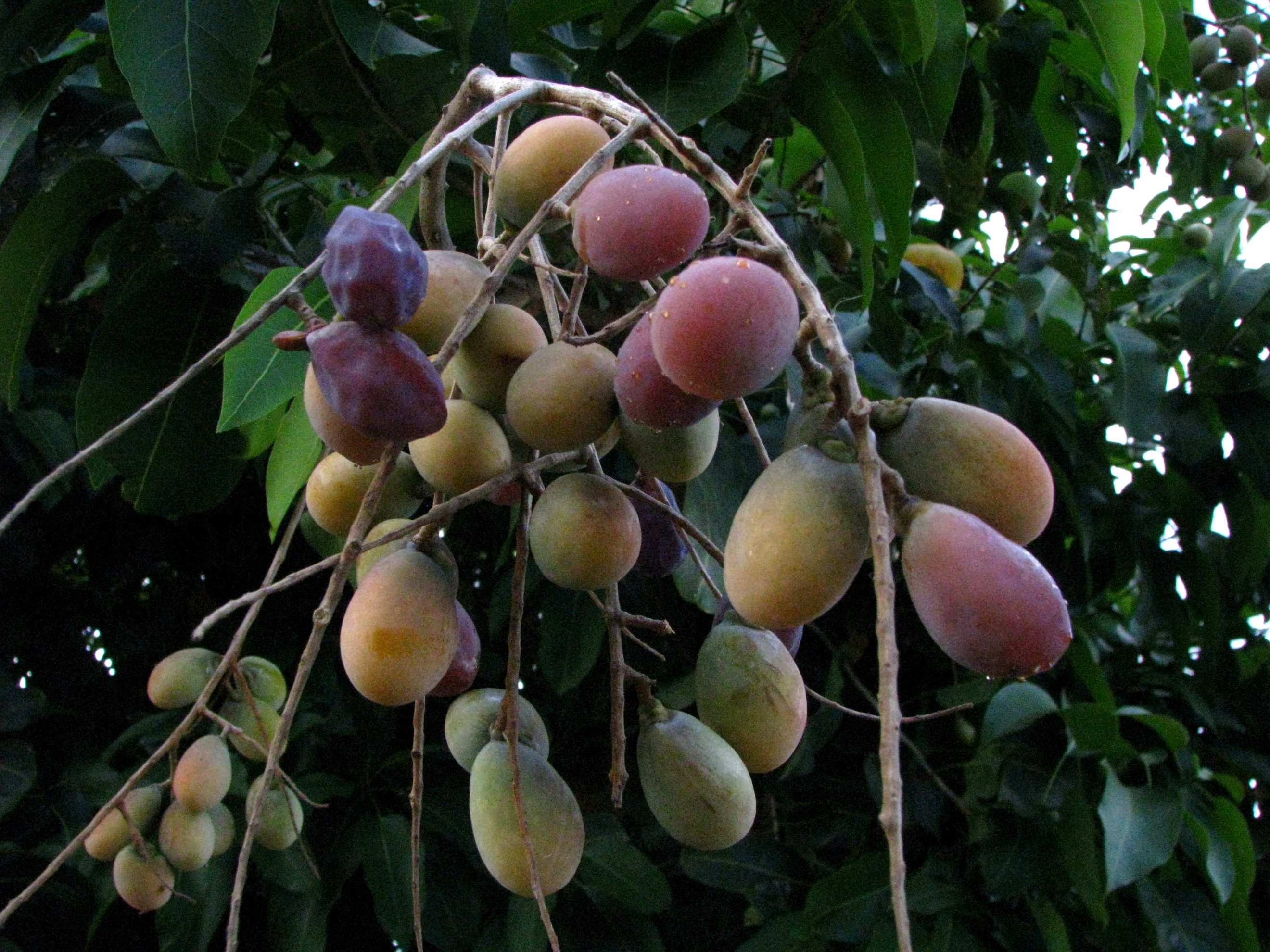
Fruits

Āulu grows up to 18 m (59 ft) tall with a trunk diameter of 0.5 m (1.6 ft). It has alternately arranged, hairless leaves which have simple blades, unlike its congener, the wingless soapberry (S. saponaria), which has compound leaves. The leaves are somewhat thick and green with a yellow midvein. They are up to 15 cm (5.9 in) long. The inflorescence is a panicle of many greenish yellow, bell-shaped male and female flowers. The fruit is a shiny, leathery berry roughly 2 cm (0.8 in) long, containing one large black seed. The fruits are not edible.

The inflorescence is a panicle of many greenish yellow, bell shaped male and female flowers. They bloom during the spring, summer, and winter. The flowers grow in clusters from the bases of the leaf stems . The wood is hard and light brown with gray-to-white bark. Yellow-brown fuzz coats the younger branches. Balladyna velutina is a common fungus which grows on Sapindus oahunesis. This fungus appears as a powdery white mildew.

== Distribution and habitat ==
It can be found in dry and moist forest habitat at elevations of 200–2,000 ft (60–610 m). It is possible that the Sapindus oahunesis arrived in Hawaiʻi by floating in the water because the fruit have trapped air pockets which allow them to float . Sapindus oahunesis tend to inhabit semi-deciduous forests that are dry.

== Cultural significance ==
Early Hawaiians used the hard blackish seeds for medicinal purposes and to string permanent lei. The hardwood was used to make spears. Today this tree is used for its fragrance, to provide privacy/shade, woodwork, or as a windbreak. It may also be used to wash hair or clothes by cutting up the fruits and mixing them with water. It is tolerant to drought and windy conditions. Sapindus oahunesis are also important in providing habitat for native bird species, such as the ʻelepaio.

== Conservation ==
In 1998, Sapindus oahunesis was assessed for the IUCN Red List of Threatened Species and was listed as Vulnerable under criteria A1ce. This status was confirmed by a new assessment on 29 August 2023, which expanded the criteria to B1ab(i,ii,iii,iv,v)+2ab(i,ii,iii,iv,v) As of November 2024, it is considered imperiled/vulnerable.

== Disease and pests ==
The most common pests of the Sapindis oahunesis are the black twigboreers and false powderpost beetles which bore into the wood. It is best to remove any dead branches to minimize their impact. Sometimes, the smaller leaves are chewed by Chinese rose beetles. It is recommended to hand pick the beetles off the plant every few weeks during the night time or trying rose beetle traps. Occasionally, whiteflies will infest the underside of the leaves, which may be treated with an at home insecticidal soap.
