= Adoretus lineatus =

Scientific classification
- Kingdom: Animalia
- Phylum: Arthropoda
- Clade: Pancrustacea
- Class: Insecta
- Order: Coleoptera
- Suborder: Polyphaga
- Infraorder: Scarabaeiformia
- Family: Scarabaeidae
- Genus: Adoretus
- Species: A. lineatus

Binomial name
- Adoretus lineatus Brenske, 1895

Species of beetle

Adoretus lineatus is a species of beetle of the family Scarabaeidae. It is found in Ethiopia.

== Description ==
Adults reach a length of about 9 mm (0.35 in). The elytra are punctate in rows and the costae are distinct, narrow, and bordered by two rows of punctures. The difference in size between the anterior claws is significant.
