= Adoretus bottegoi =

Scientific classification
- Kingdom: Animalia
- Phylum: Arthropoda
- Clade: Pancrustacea
- Class: Insecta
- Order: Coleoptera
- Suborder: Polyphaga
- Infraorder: Scarabaeiformia
- Family: Scarabaeidae
- Genus: Adoretus
- Species: A. bottegoi

Binomial name
- Adoretus bottegoi Brenske, 1895

Species of beetle

Adoretus bottegoi is a species of beetle of the family Scarabaeidae. It is found in Ethiopia and Somalia.

== Description ==
Adults reach a length of about 9.5 mm (0.37 in). They are shining yellow. The third tooth of the fore-tibiae is close to the second and the entire upper surface is very sparsely and finely haired. The pronotum is coarsely and widely punctured and the elytra have narrow, flat ridges formed by two rows of punctures. The punctures themselves are deep, sharp, and distinct. The pygidium is more densely covered with greyish hair.
