= Dipteropeltis hirundo =

Scientific classification
- Kingdom: Animalia
- Phylum: Arthropoda
- Class: Ichthyostraca
- Order: Arguloida
- Family: Argulidae
- Genus: Dipteropeltis
- Species: D. hirundo

Binomial name
- Dipteropeltis hirundo Calman, 1912

Species of fish louse

Dipteropeltis hirundo is a little-known species of fish louse. It is an ectoparasite of fish found in South America, including piranhas and barred sorubim.
