= Adoretus congoensis =

Scientific classification
- Kingdom: Animalia
- Phylum: Arthropoda
- Class: Insecta
- Order: Coleoptera
- Suborder: Polyphaga
- Infraorder: Scarabaeiformia
- Family: Scarabaeidae
- Genus: Adoretus
- Species: A. congoensis

Binomial name
- Adoretus congoensis Frey, 1968

Species of beetle

Adoretus congoensis is a species of beetle of the family Scarabaeidae. It is found in the Republic of the Congo.

== Description ==
Adults reach a length of about 9.5–10.5 mm. The upper surface and antennae are dark brown, while the underside and legs are brown. The head, pronotum, scutellum, elytra and underside are fairly uniformly, not very densely, covered with thin and short, light grey setae. On the pygidium, these setae are longer and tufted in the middle of the pygidium.
