= Adoretus angustus =

Scientific classification
- Kingdom: Animalia
- Phylum: Arthropoda
- Class: Insecta
- Order: Coleoptera
- Suborder: Polyphaga
- Infraorder: Scarabaeiformia
- Family: Scarabaeidae
- Genus: Adoretus
- Species: A. angustus

Binomial name
- Adoretus angustus Frey, 1968

Species of beetle

Adoretus angustus is a species of beetle of the family Scarabaeidae. It is found in the Republic of the Congo.

== Description ==
Adults reach a length of about 8.5-9 mm. They have an elongated body. The upper and lower surfaces are yellowish-brown, the antennae yellowish-brown, the tarsi darkened and the frons and vertex blackish-brown. The upper surface is sparsely but fairly evenly covered with short whitish setae and the underside is extremely sparsely pubescent.
