= Adoretus versutus =

Scientific classification
- Kingdom: Animalia
- Phylum: Arthropoda
- Clade: Pancrustacea
- Class: Insecta
- Order: Coleoptera
- Suborder: Polyphaga
- Infraorder: Scarabaeiformia
- Family: Scarabaeidae
- Genus: Adoretus
- Species: A. versutus

Binomial name
- Adoretus versutus Harold, 1869

Synonyms
- Adoretus bangalorensis Brenske, 1900; Adoretus insularis Fairmaire, 1897; Adoretus vestitus Boheman, 1858; Adoretus vitiensis Nonfried, 1891

Species of beetle

Adoretus versutus, commonly known as rose beetle, is a species of shining leaf chafer found in Afro-Oriental tropics.

== Etymology ==
Common names of the beetle includes: Indian rose beetle, leaf chafer beetle, rRose beetle, Fijian root grub, and Fijian cane root grub.

== Distribution ==
It is native to Oriental regions and can be found in many Asian countries including: India, Andaman and Nicobar islands, Pakistan, Sri Lanka, and Indonesia. It is also distributed in African islands: Madagascar, Mauritius, St. Helena, Seychelles, Fiji, and Oceanian islands: Samoa, Tonga, Wallis Islands, Cook Islands. Meanwhile, the species has introduced to many countries where they became major pests due to absence of natural predators.

It is also introduced to Vanuatu where it became a serious pest due to absence of predators. It is also found in New Caledonia.

== Biology ==
Lifecycle usually completed in three months. Female known to lay eggs in soil during early part of the monsoon season between May and August. Eggs hatch after 8 to 14 days in soil. Larvae can be seen in around a week and started to feed on roots. During drought periods, larvae move deeper in the soil where the come closer to the surface during wet periods. Pupation completed before the onset of next monsoon. Adults emerge after rainy showers.

=== Larva ===
Grubs are whitish translucent in color. The resting posture is C-shaped. Third instar is about 20–25 mm in length. Head reddish brown in color. The last abdominal segment swollen and dark particularly due to the soil ingestion. Spiracles creamy white with 9 pairs in which one pair prothoracic and eight pairs abdominal segments.

=== Pupa ===
Pupa yellowish brown where they become much darker in final pupal stages. Full grown pupa is about 16 mm in length.

=== Adult ===
Adult beetle has large dark eyes. Body reddish chestnut in color with average length of 12 to 14 mm in length. However, male is smaller than female. Body broader and convex with shiny underside. Scutellum short. Lamellate antennae are brownish, with ten-segments. Last three antennomeres expanded into a plate like structure. Pronotum dark and less densely punctate in the mid region. Clypeus and frons darker. Labrum and labium hairy. There are acute teeth in tibia of first leg pair which helps during burrowing in sand. Elytra brownish with metallic sheen, sclerotized, and punctate. There are fine bristles in elytra, pronotum and head. Female has broader body which is more convex.

== Economic importance ==
A polyphagous pest, it is one of the major pest in cocoa plantations and rose cultivations in Vanuatu and other countries. It also attack shade trees, and ornamentals in Uganda where the outbreak of adults show defoliation. Grubs also attack the roots of wild turmeric.

In Fiji, the larvae can be destroyed by an entomopoxvirus.

=== host plants ===
- Abelmoschus manihot
- Acacia
- Acalypha wilkesiana
- Alphitonia zizyphoides
- Anacardium occidentale
- Arachis hypogaea
- Bauhinia
- Barringtonia edulis
- Bougainvillea spectabilis
- Carica papaya
- Citrus limon
- Citrus maxima
- Citrus sinensis
- Citrus x paradisica
- Coffea canephora
- Colocasia esculenta
- Curcuma aromatica
- Delonix regia
- Dioscorea
- Eriobotrya japonica
- Ficus carica
- Hibiscus tiliaceus
- Ipomoea batatas
- Lagerstroemia indica
- Litchi sinensis
- Malus pumila
- Musa
- Pachyrhizus erosus
- Persea americana
- Phaseolus
- Pometia pinnata
- Prunus domestica
- Psidium guajava
- Pyrus communis
- Raphanus sativus
- Rosa
- Saccharum officinarum
- Solanum melongena
- Solanum tuberosum
- Sorghum bicolor
- Syzygium malaccense
- Terminalia catappa
- Terminalia tomentosa
- Terminalia arjuna
- Theobroma cacao
- Vigna unguiculata
- Vitis
- Zingiber officinale
- Zinnia
- Ziziphus jujuba
