= Adoretus bicaudatus =

Scientific classification
- Kingdom: Animalia
- Phylum: Arthropoda
- Class: Insecta
- Order: Coleoptera
- Suborder: Polyphaga
- Infraorder: Scarabaeiformia
- Family: Scarabaeidae
- Genus: Adoretus
- Species: A. bicaudatus

Binomial name
- Adoretus bicaudatus Arrow, 1917

Species of beetle

Adoretus bicaudatus, is a species of shining leaf chafer found in India and Sri Lanka.

== Description ==
Adults are about 12.66 mm long. The body is flat, elongated, and parallel sided. The dorsum is brown or testaceous and completely covered with decumbent white setae. The setae form patches in three longitudinal rows on elytra. The head is elongated and transverse. The surface has rough punctures that become coarser toward the rear. The clypeus is short and broad while the antennae is clubbed and consists of nine segments. The pronotum is short and transverse. The scutellum is obtusely triangular and coarsely punctured. The elytra have a rough, leathery surface with raised humps. The pygidium is also rough whereas mesosternum is laterally rugose.

Adults have been recorded from Lagerstroemia species.
