= Adoretus fairmairei =

Scientific classification
- Kingdom: Animalia
- Phylum: Arthropoda
- Clade: Pancrustacea
- Class: Insecta
- Order: Coleoptera
- Suborder: Polyphaga
- Infraorder: Scarabaeiformia
- Family: Scarabaeidae
- Genus: Adoretus
- Species: A. fairmairei

Binomial name
- Adoretus fairmairei Brenske, 1895

Synonyms
- Adoretus spinosus Brenske, 1895

Species of beetle

Adoretus fairmairei is a species of beetle of the family Scarabaeidae. It is found in Ethiopia.

== Description ==
Adults reach a length of about 9–11 mm (0.35–0.43 in). They are dark, with reddish-tinged femora and tibiae, showing a slight metallic sheen above. The vestiture is sparse, the pronotum has smooth spots, and the elytra are densely punctate with a dull, leathery texture, featuring indistinct glabrous spots on the suggested ridges and faint tufts of hair alongside them, as well as on the apical prominence. The pygidium is shagreened at the apex and devoid of hair.
