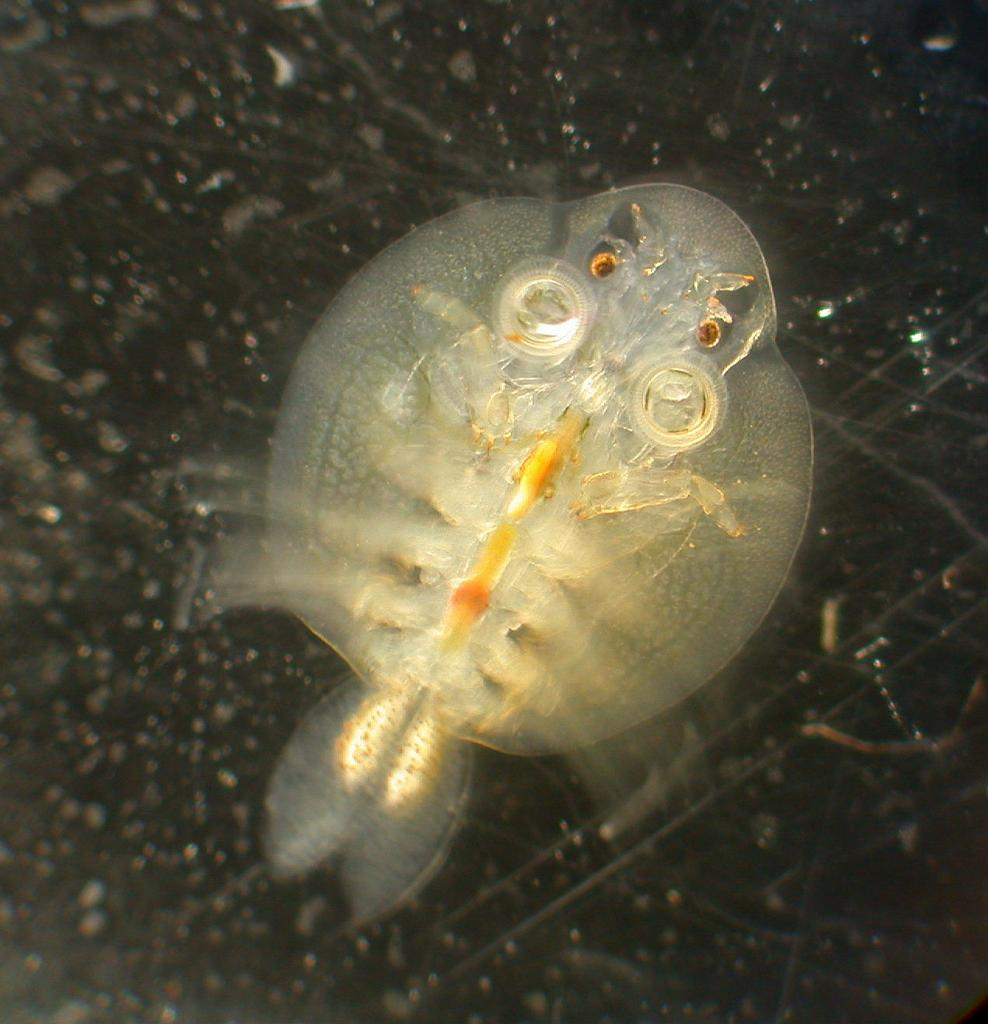

Scientific classification
- Kingdom: Animalia
- Phylum: Arthropoda
- Class: Ichthyostraca
- Order: Arguloida
- Family: Argulidae
- Genus: Argulus
- Species: A. coregoni

Binomial name
- Argulus coregoni Thorell, 1865

= Argulus coregoni =

Parasitic of crustacean

The carp louse Argulus coregoni is an obligate ectoparasitic branciuran species on fish. It occurs in China and Japan, and Scandinavia. Argulus coregoni can pose a threat to fish kept in fish farms.

== Life cycle ==
Argulus coregoni has a direct life cycle, meaning that the parasite is transmitted between individuals of the same host species without an intermediate host. At Northern latitudes, adults do not survive winter, but only the eggs attached to rocks survive throughout the winter. Egg hatching occurs in May once water temperatures exceed 10 °C. From the eggs, metanauplii emerge which actively search for a fish host to feed on. These can survive up to two days without finding a host. One or two generations can be completed each year, depending on environmental conditions. This means that infection rates of host typically reach their peak during the summer months. Females start laying eggs from July until the end of summer.

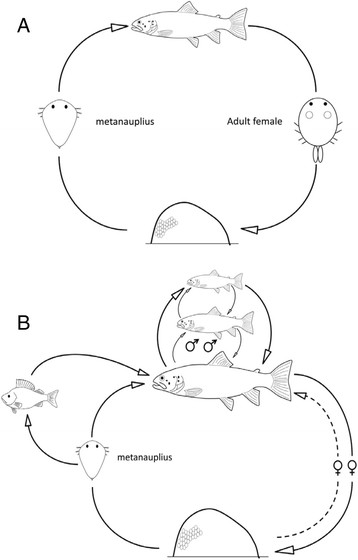
Description of the life cycle of Argulus coregoni, both simplified (A) and ecologically accurate (B). From:

Although some differences are seen in the development between males and females, the adults generally have the same size 9–12 mm (0.4–0.5 in). This is in contrast with other dioecious crustacean species The sex ratio — the ratio between males and females in the population — is generally close to 1:1, as expected for sexually reproducing species under Fisher's principle. Both sexes can detach from the host and find alternative hosts. However, this behaviour is more common in males as they can also switch between hosts to search for mates.

== Host species ==
Argulus coregoni mainly infect salmonids, such as rainbow trout and brook trout. It is, however, also able to infect other species of fish, such sweet fish. This is supported by evidence that larvae can successfully develop on both salmonids and cyprinids, but developmental rate and reproductive output on the latter host group is reduced.

In choice experiments it shows increased host preference with maturation, this likely reflects the better development on its normal salmonid hosts.

== Distribution ==
Originally from Europe, A. coregoni In recent years, A. coregoni has shown a geographical expansion in Japan and to India in recent years.

=== On the host ===
Argulus coregoni aggregate on specific parts of their hosts. The prefer attaching near the fins, in particular the pectoral and pelvic fins. Larger individuals are found towards the head of the host, but not on the head. To move from one host to another it can swim freely in water column. Adults can survive up to two weeks without feeding on a fish host.

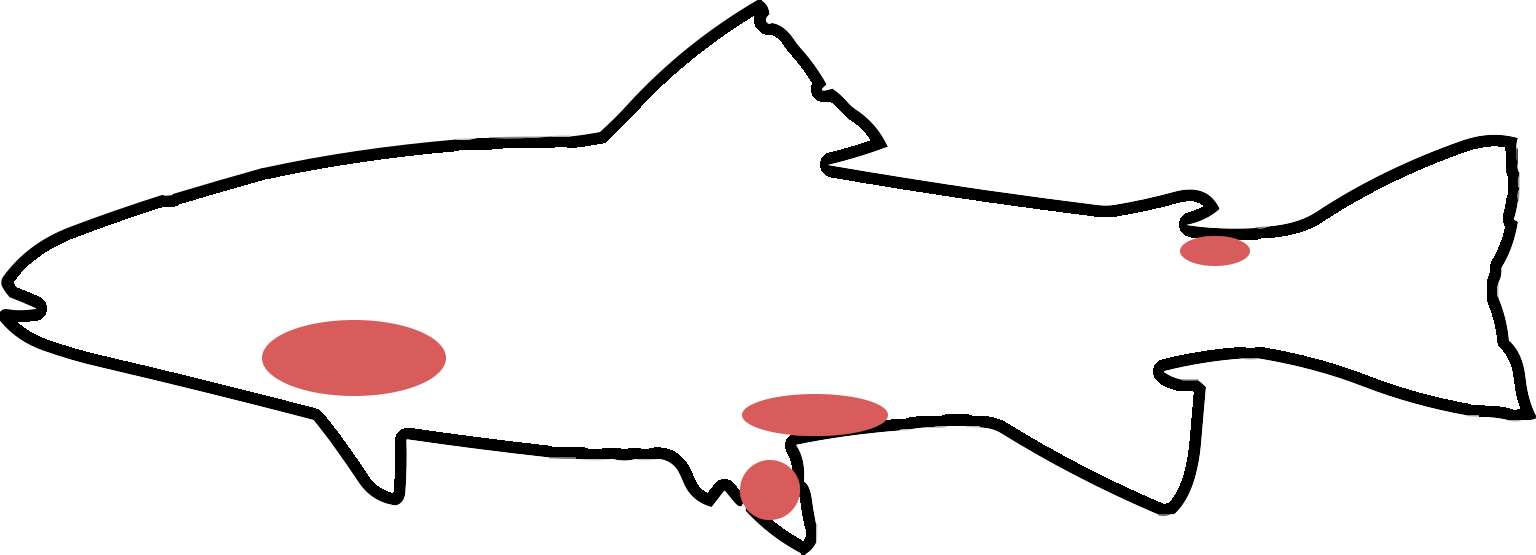
Typical sites where Argulus coregoni can be found on salmonoid hosts. Based on Shimura (1983).

Argulus coregoni attaches itself to the host with suckers (maxillae) and hooks. The latter are abundant on the underside of the body. The suckers are used to tear the host skin. A. coregoni feed on the blood and mucus from the resulting wound.

They bury their bodies into the scale pockets and their flattened body shape allows them to sit closely against the body of the host, minimising drag and the risk of detachment. The eggs of gravid females protrude from the fish scales.

=== In the host population ===
Like many ectoparasites, A. coregoni shows aggregation within the host population. This means that some host individuals carry many parasites, but that most only carry a few. This appears to be due to differences in exposure rather than in susceptibility. Indeed, it appears that host behaviour plays an important role in exposure and that certain hos behaviours make them more susceptible to infections.

== Anatomy ==
The antennule are divided into two parts. The abdomen has two lobes, but has no spines.

== Symptoms ==
Infected fish can show a range of symptoms, especially at heavier infections. The symptoms include scales peeling off, red spots at the site of infection, and reduced growth rates. Fish can become weak, but Argulus coregoni does normally not cause host mortality. In coinfections it can, however, increase host mortality in some host species. Argulus coregoni infections do not lead to threats to natural fish populations. In fish farms the infections may case problems due to the lack of natural predators of the parasites, and the high density of fish.
