= Chonopeltis =

Scientific classification
- Kingdom: Animalia
- Phylum: Arthropoda
- Clade: Pancrustacea
- Class: Ichthyostraca
- Order: Arguloida
- Family: Argulidae
- Genus: Chonopeltis; Thiele, 1900

Genus of fish lice

Chonopeltis is a genus of fish lice in the subclass Branchiura. These crustaceans are ectoparasitic freshwater fish host. Species of this genus are exclusively found in rivers in Africa.

== Description ==
Members of this genus do not grow any larger than a few millimetres. They have flat bodies covered by a carapace, and have two large suction cups, one on either side their heads. These suction cups are used to attach to their hosts. Chonopeltis feed on various tissues, including mucus, internal fluids, and sloughed-off scales.

The genus Chonopeltis is distinguished from the genus Argulus due to its lack of a preoral spine and from Dolops by the presence of suckers rather than hooks.

== Reproduction and life cycle ==
Mating and larval development of Chonopeltis occur on the host. Gravid females do not leave the host to lay eggs, as they are poor swimmers. This is in contrast to other members of the family Argulidae, who must leave their hosts to mate. Unlike many other crustaceans, female Chonopeltis do not carry the fertilised eggs in an egg sac, but they deposit their eggs on a substrate. To lay they eggs, the females do not leave the fish host, but lean off.

== Species ==
As of December, 2022, there are 12 species recognised in the genus Chonopeltis:

- Chonopeltis australis Boxshall, 1976
- Chonopeltis brevis Fryer, 1961
- Chonopeltis congicus Fryer, 1959
- Chonopeltis elongatus Fryer, 1974
- Chonopeltis flaccifrons Fryer, 1960
- Chonopeltis fryeri Van As, 1986
- Chonopeltis inermis Thiele, 1900
- Chonopeltis lisikili Van As J.G. & Van As L.L., 1996
- Chonopeltis liversedgi Van As & Van As, 1999
- Chonopeltis meridionalis Fryer, 1964
- Chonopeltis minutus Fryer, 1977
- Chonopeltis schoutedeni Brian, 1940

The species Chonopeltis minutus may be extinct as it has not been observed since 1974.
