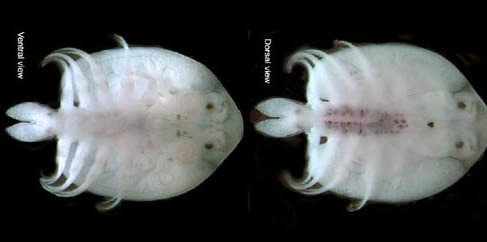

Scientific classification
- Kingdom: Animalia
- Phylum: Arthropoda
- Class: Ichthyostraca
- Order: Arguloida
- Family: Argulidae
- Genus: Argulus
- Species: A. japonicus

Binomial name
- Argulus japonicus Thiele, 1900

= Argulus japonicus =

Species of crustacean

Argulus japonicus, also known as the Japanese fish louse, is a species of crustacean in the family Argulidae. This species is light brown in colour and may be between 4 and 9 mm long and 3 to 6 mm wide. It has a stumpy tail, and is shaped somewhat like a round shield. The female and male are phenotypically distinct, categorizing them as a dioecious species. Although they are not drastically different, their transparent skin highlights the minor differences such as the different copulatory accessories.

== Distribution ==
Argulus japonicus is native to Asian countries, where it parasitises carp species such as goldfish and common carp. This species is highly invasive, and is now found throughout the world, probably via the pet fish trade. Many fish host this louse, which is probably able to parasitize almost every species of freshwater fish.

== Pathogenesis ==
This parasite can severely damage the host's integument and affect its appetite, sometimes killing it. It attaches itself to the gills, fins or skin of the host using its suckers, and then feeds by injecting a toxin into the host which pre-digests the tissue. It then uses its mandibles to draw the food into its mouth.

== Life cycle ==
Argulus japonicus reproduces sexually, with females laying anywhere from 1-9 strings of 5–226 eggs after mating occurs on the host. These eggs are deposited on hard surfaces, then covered by gelatinous excretions from the female. After eggs hatch in about 2 weeks (or longer at lower temperatures), larvae are only able to survive for 1–2 days before requiring nutrition from a host fish. After attachment to a host, larvae will pass through several stages before maturing into adult form.

== Treatment ==
The insecticide Dipterex is able to kill both adult and larval stages of Argulus japonicus; however, eggs are unaffected by this treatment, meaning an initial application of the compound must be repeated after two weeks (after which any eggs laid will have hatched) in order to achieve an effective reduction of the parasite. Alternatively, the fish can be transferred to a clean container and the infected aquarium be allowed to thoroughly dry to destroy the eggs and any free-swimming A. japonicus.
