= Adoretus celogaster =

Scientific classification
- Kingdom: Animalia
- Phylum: Arthropoda
- Class: Insecta
- Order: Coleoptera
- Suborder: Polyphaga
- Infraorder: Scarabaeiformia
- Family: Scarabaeidae
- Genus: Adoretus
- Species: A. celogaster

Binomial name
- Adoretus celogaster Arrow, 1914

Species of beetle

Adoretus celogaster, is a species of shining leaf chafer found in Sri Lanka.
