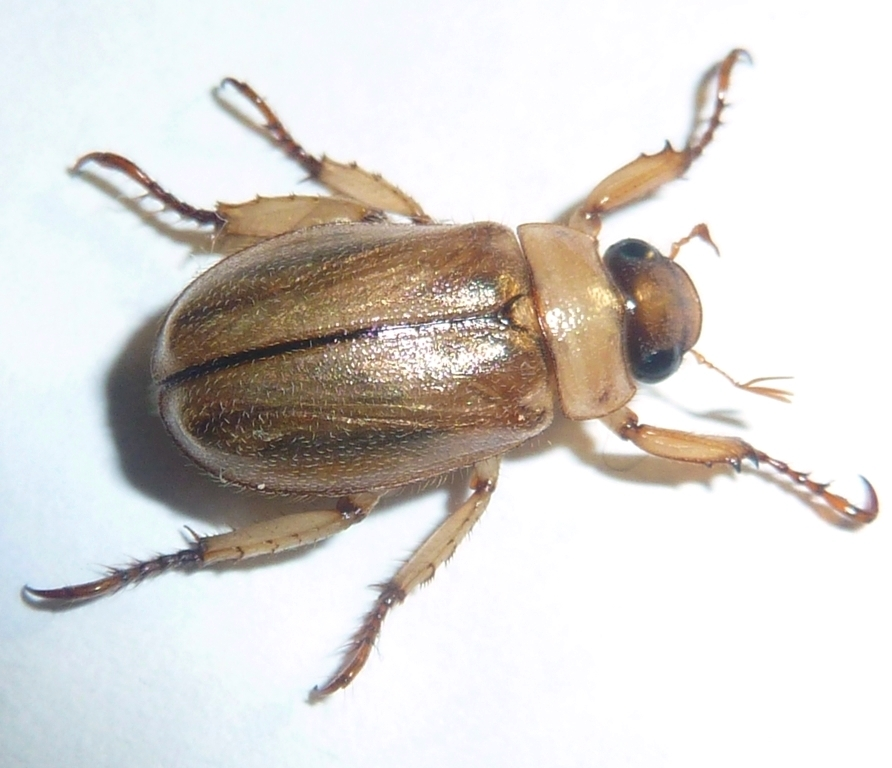
- A. ictericus

Scientific classification
- Kingdom: Animalia
- Phylum: Arthropoda
- Clade: Pancrustacea
- Class: Insecta
- Order: Coleoptera
- Suborder: Polyphaga
- Infraorder: Scarabaeiformia
- Family: Scarabaeidae
- Subfamily: Rutelinae
- Genus: Adoretus; Laporte, 1840

Synonyms
- Prionadoretus Ohaus, 1914; Psiladoretus Ohaus, 1913

= Adoretus =

Genus of beetles

Adoretus is a genus of Scarabaeidae or scarab beetles. They are native to Africa and Asia, and two species occur in Europe.

== Description ==
Adoretus beetles are elongate and oval in shape, 10-12 long, and brown with a covering of white/cream setae. The head has a broad, circular clypeus with a reflexed margin. Underneath this is a labrum with a median apical projection overhanging the mentum. There is a pair of antennae, each with 9-10 segments and a 3-segmented club. The pronotum has a thickened setose border. The elytra are irregularly coarsely punctate, and the disc usually has 2-3 raised longitudinal lines. There are three pairs of legs. The first pair has two or three teeth on each tibia. The tarsi of the second and third leg pairs are simple and asymmetrical. The tibiae of the last leg pair have truncate apices, each with two apical spurs situated close together.

Different species look very similar and can only be told apart by examining genitalia of males or by molecular identification tools.

== Diet ==
Adults of Adoretus appear to be generalist herbivores, feeding on leaves of a wide range of plants. The larvae are associated with roots and feed on either live or dead plant tissue, depending on the species.

== Pests ==
Several species of Adoretus are pests. Their eggs and larvae may be easily transported to new locations in the soil or roots of cultivated plants.

- Adoretus bicolor feeds on grapevine (Vitis spp.), peanut (Arachis hypogaea) and rose (Rosa spp.). It occurs in India.
- Adoretus caliginosus feeds on cotton (Gossypium hirsutum). It occurs in Pakistan.
- Adoretus compresses feeds on lychee (Litchi chinensis). It occurs in Africa, Asia and Australasia.
- Adoretus hirsutus feeds on lychee as well. It occurs in China and Taiwan.
- Adoretus ranunculus feeds on cocoa (Theobroma cacao). It occurs in the Philippines.
- Adoretus sinicus feeds on over 250 species in 56 plant families. It occurs in Asia and the Pacific Islands.
- Adoretus tenuimaculatus feeds on 186 species in 42 plant families. It occurs in China, Japan and Taiwan.
- Adoretus versutus feeds on cacao, coffee (Coffea arabica), rose and various vegetable and ornamental plants. It occurs in Asia, Africa, Australasia and the Pacific Islands.

== Species ==
=== A ===
- Adoretus abdolrezagharibi
- Adoretus abyssinicus
- Adoretus acniceps
- Adoretus aculeatus
- Adoretus adustus
- Adoretus aegrotus
- Adoretus aeneiceps
- Adoretus aeneopiceus
- Adoretus aenescens
- Adoretus aeneus
- Adoretus aeruginosus
- Adoretus affinis
- Adoretus afghanus
- Adoretus agnatus
- Adoretus albolineatus
- Adoretus albomitratus
- Adoretus alocopygus
- Adoretus amitinus
- Adoretus amoenus
- Adoretus ampliatus
- Adoretus andrewesi
- Adoretus angustus
- Adoretus aquilonis
- Adoretus areatus
- Adoretus ariel
- Adoretus arrowi
- Adoretus asperopunctatus
- Adoretus atiqi
- Adoretus aurantiacus
- Adoretus avitus

=== B ===
- Adoretus bakeri
- Adoretus baquari
- Adoretus bechuanus
- Adoretus bechynei
- Adoretus beiranus
- Adoretus bengalensis
- Adoretus bernhardi
- Adoretus bhutanensis
- Adoretus bicaudatus
- Adoretus bicolor
- Adoretus bidenticeps
- Adoretus bilobatus
- Adoretus bimarginatus
- Adoretus birmanus
- Adoretus bombinator
- Adoretus boops
- Adoretus borbonicus
- Adoretus borneensis
- Adoretus bottegoi
- Adoretus brachypygus
- Adoretus brahmanus
- Adoretus brancsik
- Adoretus breviunguiculatus

=== C ===
- Adoretus cachecticus
- Adoretus caliginosus
- Adoretus calvus
- Adoretus capicola
- Adoretus capito
- Adoretus cardoni
- Adoretus carinilabris
- Adoretus celebicus
- Adoretus celogaster
- Adoretus cephalotes
- Adoretus chascoproctus
- Adoretus chinchonae
- Adoretus ciliatus
- Adoretus cirroseriatus
- Adoretus claustifer
- Adoretus clypeatus
- Adoretus cochinchinensis
- Adoretus compressus
- Adoretus congoensis
- Adoretus consularis
- Adoretus convexicollis
- Adoretus convexus
- Adoretus coronatus
- Adoretus corpulentus
- Adoretus costalis
- Adoretus costipennis
- Adoretus costopilosus
- Adoretus costulatus
- Adoretus cribratus
- Adoretus cribricollis
- Adoretus cribrosus
- Adoretus cristatus
- Adoretus cupreus
- Adoretus curtulus
- Adoretus cylindricus
- Adoretus cyrtopygus

=== D ===
- Adoretus debilis
- Adoretus deccanus
- Adoretus decorsei
- Adoretus delkeskampi
- Adoretus densepunctatus
- Adoretus denticrus
- Adoretus depilatus
- Adoretus depressus
- Adoretus digennaroi
- Adoretus dilleri
- Adoretus discoidalis
- Adoretus discolor
- Adoretus disparilis
- Adoretus dissidens
- Adoretus distinguendus
- Adoretus divergens
- Adoretus diversicolor
- Adoretus djallonus
- Adoretus drescheri
- Adoretus drurei
- Adoretus dulcis
- Adoretus duplicatus
- Adoretus duvauceli

=== E ===
- Adoretus elongatus
- Adoretus emarginatus
- Adoretus endroedii
- Adoretus epipleuralis
- Adoretus ermineus
- Adoretus erythrocephalus
- Adoretus evelynae
- Adoretus exasperans
- Adoretus excisiceps
- Adoretus excisus
- Adoretus exiguus
- Adoretus exitialis
- Adoretus exsculptus
- Adoretus exsecatus

=== F ===
- Adoretus faccai
- Adoretus fairmairei
- Adoretus falciungulatus
- Adoretus fallaciosus
- Adoretus fascicularis
- Adoretus fatehi
- Adoretus feminalis
- Adoretus femoratus
- Adoretus flaveolus
- Adoretus flavilabris
- Adoretus flavipennis
- Adoretus flavipes
- Adoretus flavohumeralis
- Adoretus flavomaculatus
- Adoretus flavus
- Adoretus formosanus
- Adoretus franzi
- Adoretus fraterculus
- Adoretus fraudator
- Adoretus fraudulentus
- Adoretus freudei
- Adoretus fruhstorferi
- Adoretus fulvus
- Adoretus fumatus
- Adoretus furcifer
- Adoretus furutai
- Adoretus fusciceps
- Adoretus fuscoseriatus
- Adoretus fuscovittatus
- Adoretus fusculus

=== G ===
- Adoretus gaillardi
- Adoretus gandolphei
- Adoretus ganganus
- Adoretus garamas
- Adoretus gazella
- Adoretus gemmifer
- Adoretus geyri
- Adoretus ghanaensis
- Adoretus ghindanus
- Adoretus giganteus
- Adoretus goniopygus
- Adoretus goudoti
- Adoretus graniceps
- Adoretus granulifrons
- Adoretus gressetti
- Adoretus gressitti
- Adoretus griseosetosus
- Adoretus grisescens
- Adoretus guttulatus
- Adoretus gymnotopus

=== H ===
- Adoretus hainanensis
- Adoretus hanoiensis
- Adoretus hanstroemi
- Adoretus hexagonus
- Adoretus hirasawai
- Adoretus hiriticulus
- Adoretus hirsutus
- Adoretus hirticollis
- Adoretus hirtipennis
- Adoretus hispidus
- Adoretus hoplioides
- Adoretus horticola
- Adoretus hybogeneius
- Adoretus hypudaeus

=== I ===
- Adoretus ibanus
- Adoretus ictericus
- Adoretus iftikhari
- Adoretus illitus
- Adoretus imitator
- Adoretus impurus
- Adoretus inconditus
- Adoretus incongruens
- Adoretus incurvatus
- Adoretus indutus
- Adoretus inexpectatus
- Adoretus infans
- Adoretus inglorius
- Adoretus inornatus
- Adoretus inseparabilis
- Adoretus interruptus
- Adoretus irakanus
- Adoretus ismaili

=== J-K ===
- Adoretus jarkandus
- Adoretus javanus
- Adoretus jipensis
- Adoretus juengeri
- Adoretus kahlei
- Adoretus kamberanus
- Adoretus kanarensis
- Adoretus kaszabi
- Adoretus khartumensis
- Adoretus khasmarensis
- Adoretus kindiae
- Adoretus klossi
- Adoretus kororensis
- Adoretus kulzeri

=== L ===
- Adoretus lacunus
- Adoretus lacustris
- Adoretus lacuum
- Adoretus ladakanus
- Adoretus lajoyi
- Adoretus langsonicus
- Adoretus laosensis
- Adoretus laoticus
- Adoretus lasiopygus
- Adoretus lasius
- Adoretus laticeps
- Adoretus latirostris
- Adoretus latissimus
- Adoretus latiusculus
- Adoretus lemniscus
- Adoretus leo
- Adoretus lepus
- Adoretus limbatus
- Adoretus lineatus
- Adoretus lithobius
- Adoretus lobiceps
- Adoretus loeffleri
- Adoretus longiceps
- Adoretus lopezi
- Adoretus luridus
- Adoretus luteipes
- Adoretus lutescens
- Adoretus lutosipennis

=== M ===
- Adoretus machatschkei
- Adoretus macrops
- Adoretus maculatus
- Adoretus maculicollis
- Adoretus madibirensis
- Adoretus malaccanus
- Adoretus maniculus
- Adoretus manyaraensis
- Adoretus marahnus
- Adoretus marshalli
- Adoretus mashunus
- Adoretus matsumotoi
- Adoretus mauritianus
- Adoretus mavis
- Adoretus melanesius
- Adoretus melvillensis
- Adoretus meo
- Adoretus metasternalis
- Adoretus meticulosus
- Adoretus minutus
- Adoretus mizusawai
- Adoretus monticola
- Adoretus morosus
- Adoretus moultoni
- Adoretus murinus
- Adoretus mus
- Adoretus musillus
- Adoretus myodes

=== N ===
- Adoretus naeemi
- Adoretus nagyi
- Adoretus nanshanchianus
- Adoretus nasalis
- Adoretus nasutus
- Adoretus nathani
- Adoretus neghellianus
- Adoretus nephriticus
- Adoretus nietneri
- Adoretus niger
- Adoretus nigrifrons
- Adoretus nigritarsis
- Adoretus nigrofuscus
- Adoretus nitens
- Adoretus nitidus
- Adoretus nossibeicus
- Adoretus nubilus
- Adoretus nudocostatus
- Adoretus nyassicus

=== O ===
- Adoretus obatoides
- Adoretus obscurus
- Adoretus occultus
- Adoretus ochraceus
- Adoretus ohausi
- Adoretus ohmomoi
- Adoretus opeticus
- Adoretus ovalis
- Adoretus ovampoensis
- Adoretus ovatoides
- Adoretus ovatus

=== P ===
- Adoretus pachysomatus
- Adoretus paiensis
- Adoretus palawanus
- Adoretus pallens
- Adoretus pallidus
- Adoretus paolii
- Adoretus parviceps
- Adoretus patrizii
- Adoretus patruelis
- Adoretus pauliani
- Adoretus peregrinus
- Adoretus perrieri
- Adoretus persicus
- Adoretus petrovitzi
- Adoretus peyerimhoffi
- Adoretus piciventris
- Adoretus picticollis
- Adoretus pictipennis
- Adoretus piscator
- Adoretus pitaulti
- Adoretus plebejus
- Adoretus pleuralis
- Adoretus pliciventris
- Adoretus plumbicollis
- Adoretus polycanthus
- Adoretus popei
- Adoretus postfoveatus
- Adoretus posticalis
- Adoretus progrediens
- Adoretus prudens
- Adoretus pruinosus
- Adoretus puberulus
- Adoretus pubipennis
- Adoretus pudicus
- Adoretus pullus
- Adoretus pulverulentus
- Adoretus pumilio
- Adoretus punctipennis
- Adoretus punjabensis
- Adoretus pusillus

=== Q-R ===
- Adoretus quadridens
- Adoretus quadripunctatus
- Adoretus radicosus
- Adoretus ranunculus
- Adoretus reichenbachi
- Adoretus renardi
- Adoretus rhamphomorius
- Adoretus rhodophilus
- Adoretus rondoni
- Adoretus rosettae
- Adoretus rothkirchi
- Adoretus rubenyani
- Adoretus rufifrons
- Adoretus rufulus
- Adoretus rufus
- Adoretus rugosohirtus
- Adoretus rugosus
- Adoretus rugulosus
- Adoretus runcinatus
- Adoretus rusticus

=== S ===
- Adoretus saetipennis
- Adoretus saigonensis
- Adoretus saitoi
- Adoretus saleemi
- Adoretus sandakanus
- Adoretus scabious
- Adoretus sciurinus
- Adoretus scutellaris
- Adoretus sebakuensis
- Adoretus semperi
- Adoretus senatorius
- Adoretus senegallius
- Adoretus senescens
- Adoretus senohi
- Adoretus seriegranatus
- Adoretus seriesetosus
- Adoretus serratipes
- Adoretus serridens
- Adoretus setifer
- Adoretus sexdentatus
- Adoretus seydeli
- Adoretus siemsseni
- Adoretus siganus
- Adoretus sikorae
- Adoretus silfverbergi
- Adoretus silonicus
- Adoretus similis
- Adoretus simplex
- Adoretus simulans
- Adoretus simulatus
- Adoretus sincerus
- Adoretus singhalensis
- Adoretus sinicus
- Adoretus sistanicus
- Adoretus somalinus
- Adoretus sorex
- Adoretus sparsesetosus
- Adoretus speculator
- Adoretus sterbae
- Adoretus stoliczkae
- Adoretus striatus
- Adoretus subaenescens
- Adoretus subcostatus
- Adoretus subguttatus
- Adoretus sucki
- Adoretus sudanicus
- Adoretus sulcirostris
- Adoretus sumbanus
- Adoretus sundaicus
- Adoretus suturalis
- Adoretus suturellus

=== T ===
- Adoretus tananus
- Adoretus tener
- Adoretus tenimbricus
- Adoretus tenuimaculatus
- Adoretus tessulatus
- Adoretus testaceus
- Adoretus tetracanthus
- Adoretus tibialis
- Adoretus tigrinus
- Adoretus timidus
- Adoretus timoriensis
- Adoretus tonkinensis
- Adoretus transvaalensis
- Adoretus trichostigma
- Adoretus tricolor
- Adoretus tsavoensis
- Adoretus tuberculiventris
- Adoretus tufaili
- Adoretus turkanus

=== U-Z ===
- Adoretus ubonensis
- Adoretus umbilicatus
- Adoretus umbrosus
- Adoretus uncifer
- Adoretus ungulatus
- Adoretus uniformis
- Adoretus vagepunctatus
- Adoretus variegatus
- Adoretus velutinus
- Adoretus versutus
- Adoretus vestitus
- Adoretus vethi
- Adoretus victoriae
- Adoretus vietnamensis
- Adoretus vigillans
- Adoretus villicollis
- Adoretus villosicollis
- Adoretus villosus
- Adoretus vitalisi
- Adoretus vitticauda
- Adoretus vittiger
- Adoretus vittipennis
- Adoretus vulpeculus
- Adoretus wallacei
- Adoretus xanthomerus
- Adoretus zavattarii
- Adoretus zumpti
