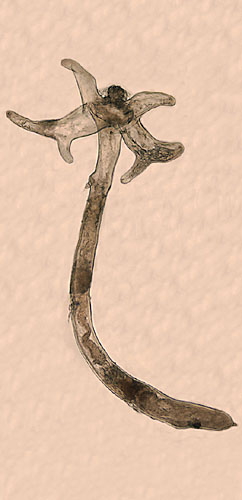
- Lernaea cyprinacea

Scientific classification
- Kingdom: Animalia
- Phylum: Arthropoda
- Class: Copepoda
- Order: Cyclopoida
- Family: Lernaeidae
- Genus: Lernaea; Linnaeus, 1758

= Lernaea =

Genus of crustaceans

Lernaea is a genus of copepod crustaceans whose members are commonly called anchor worms and are parasitic on freshwater fishes.

== Life cycle ==
Anchor worms mate during the last free-swimming (copepodid) stage of development. After mating, the female burrows into the flesh of a fish and transforms into an unsegmented, wormlike form, usually with a portion hanging from the fish's body. Eggs are released from the posterior "tails" (egg sacs) into the water, where they hatch within 24 to 36 hours. The nauplii will go through three stages before molting into copepodids, which associate with fish gills. After a further five stages and mating, the male leaves the host and dies, while the female transitions into the anchored stage (may move to different fish host).

== Diagnosis ==
Symptoms of anchor worm can be as follows:

1. Anchor worms (Lernaea sp.) can be seen with the naked eye
2. Frequent rubbing or "flashing"
3. Localised redness
4. Inflammation on the body of the fish
5. Tiny white-green or red worms in wounds
6. Breathing difficulties
7. General lethargy

== Treatment ==
There are several treatments for anchor worm in the aquarium/pond. Potassium permanganate is usually considered the best treatment and can be used either as a tank treatment or a "dip". Other treatments include a salt dip, a formalin dip, and modern antiparasitics. Salt in the aquarium at 1 to 2 tablespoons may help prevent secondary infections.

Manual removal of the parasite is one of the surest ways to get rid of it; this can be done by holding the fish in the hand and removing the parasites with a pair of tweezers, being careful not to break the tail off leaving the head embedded and dipping the fish back into water every few seconds so it can breathe. Sometimes the parasite can burrow so deeply that pulling it out can cause more trauma than leaving it in and just treating it.
