= Nesticella mogera =

Scientific classification
- Kingdom: Animalia
- Phylum: Arthropoda
- Subphylum: Chelicerata
- Class: Arachnida
- Order: Araneae
- Infraorder: Araneomorphae
- Family: Nesticidae
- Genus: Nesticella
- Species: N. mogera

Binomial name
- Nesticella mogera (Yaginuma, 1972)

Synonyms
- Nesticus terrestris (misid.); Nesticus mogera Howaia mogera

Species of spider

Nesticella mogera is a spider from the family Nesticidae. It is the type species of the genus Nesticella.

== Distribution ==
Discovered in Japan, it is found in Hawaii, Fiji, Azerbaijan, China, Korea and in 2009 in German greenhouses.

== Name ==
The name is derived from mogura (土竜(もぐら) the Japanese word for mole. N. mogera has been found in Japan in burrows of moles (Yaginuma 1970).
