= Lernaeidae =

Scientific classification
- Domain: Eukaryota
- Kingdom: Animalia
- Phylum: Arthropoda
- Class: Copepoda
- Order: Cyclopoida
- Suborder: Cyclopida
- Family: Lernaeidae

Family of crustaceans

Lernaeidae is a family of copepods belonging to the order Cyclopoida. Family Lernaeidae has 131 species. All species in Lernaeidae are parasites of freshwater fishes.

== Genera ==
Genera:

- Afrolernaea Fryer, 1956
- Amazolernaea Thatcher & Williams, 1998
- Areotrachelus Wilson, 1924
- Bedsylernaea Thatcher & Williams, 1998
- Catlaphila Tripathi, 1960
- Catlaphilla Tripathi, 1960
- Dysphorus Kurtz, 1924
- Hepatophylus Quidor, 1912
- Indolernaea Kabata, 1983
- Indopeniculus Kumari, Khera & Gupta, 1988
- Lamproglena Nordmann, 1832
- Lamproglenoides Fryer, 1964
- Lernaea Linnaeus, 1758
- Lernaeenicinae Wilson, 1917
- Lernaeinae Wilson, 1917
- Lernaeogiraffa Zimmermann, 1923
- Minilernaea Thatcher & Huergo, 2005
- Opistholernaea Yin, 1960
- Pillainus Kabata, 1983
- Pseudolamproglena Boxshall, 1976
- Taurocheros Brian, 1924
