= Lernaea cyprinacea =

Scientific classification
- Domain: Eukaryota
- Kingdom: Animalia
- Phylum: Arthropoda
- Class: Copepoda
- Order: Cyclopoida
- Family: Lernaeidae
- Genus: Lernaea
- Species: L. cyprinacea

Binomial name
- Lernaea cyprinacea Linnaeus, 1758

Species of crustacean

Lernaea cyprinacea is a species of parasitic crustacean belonging to the family Lernaeidae. It may be native to Eurasia, and has been introduced to the United Kingdom and the United States. It develops optimally at temperatures between 23 and 30 °C (73 and 86 °F). It is regarded as a major pest in aquaculture.
