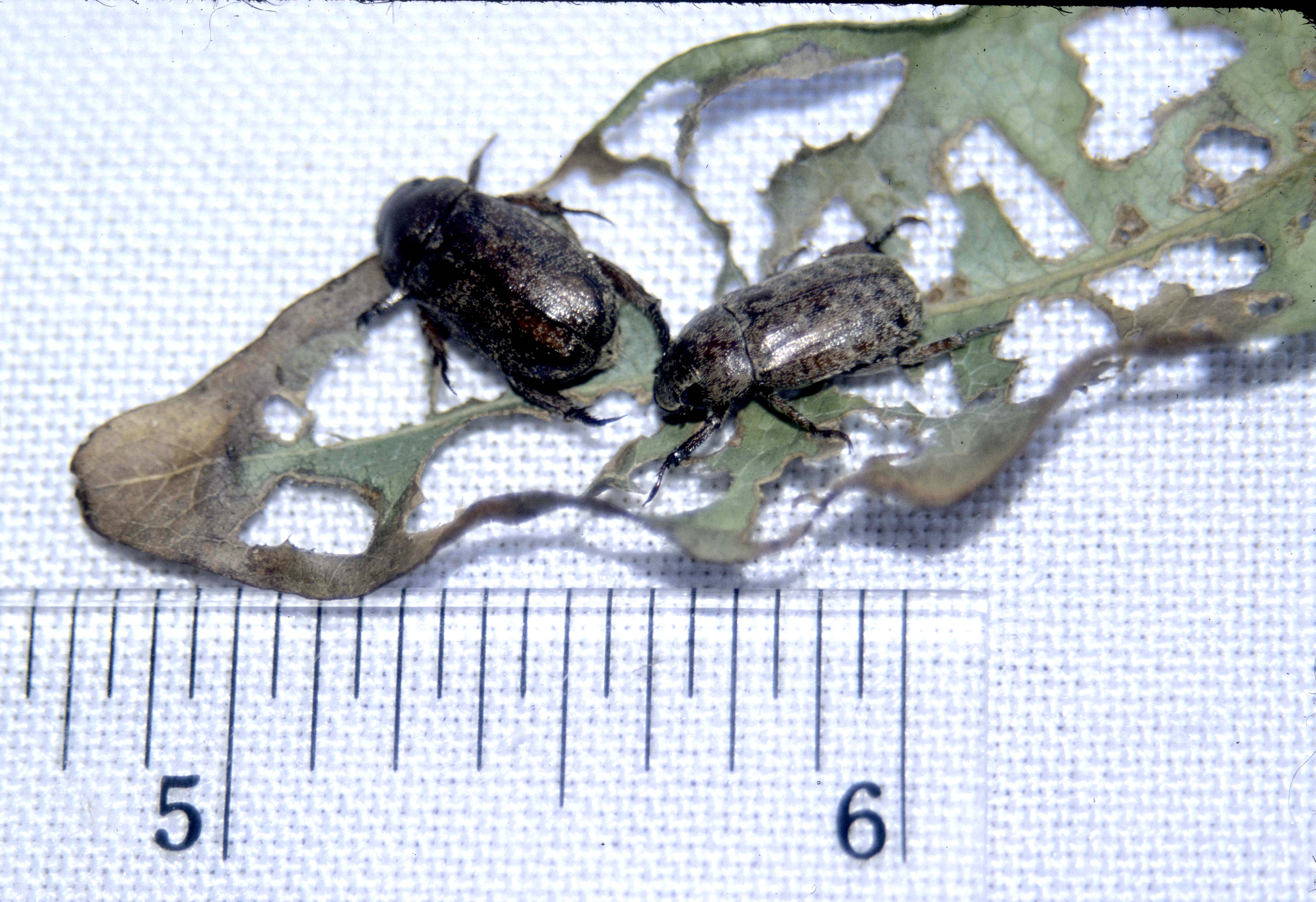
- The beetle feeding

Scientific classification
- Kingdom: Animalia
- Phylum: Arthropoda
- Clade: Pancrustacea
- Class: Insecta
- Order: Coleoptera
- Suborder: Polyphaga
- Infraorder: Scarabaeiformia
- Family: Scarabaeidae
- Genus: Adoretus
- Species: A. sinicus

Binomial name
- Adoretus sinicus Burmeister, 1855

= Adoretus sinicus =

Species of beetle

Adoretus sinicus or the Chinese rose beetle is a scarab beetle, and a member of the genus Adoretus, subgenus Adoretus.

== Food ==
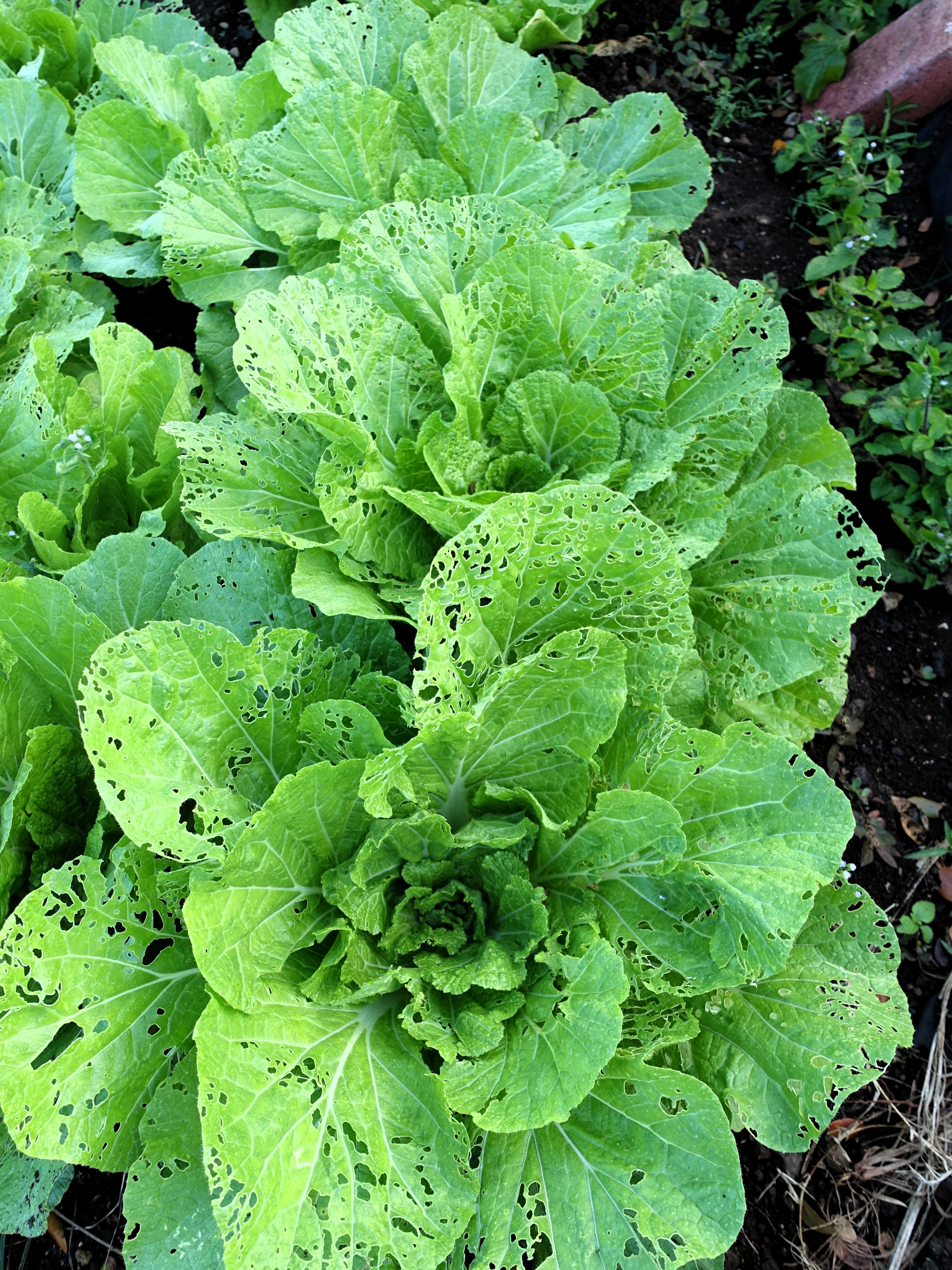
Damage caused by feeding

In Oʻahu, Hawaii, it feeds on the indigenous ʻakiohala (Hibiscus furcellatus) and maʻo hau hele (Hibiscus brackenridgei).
