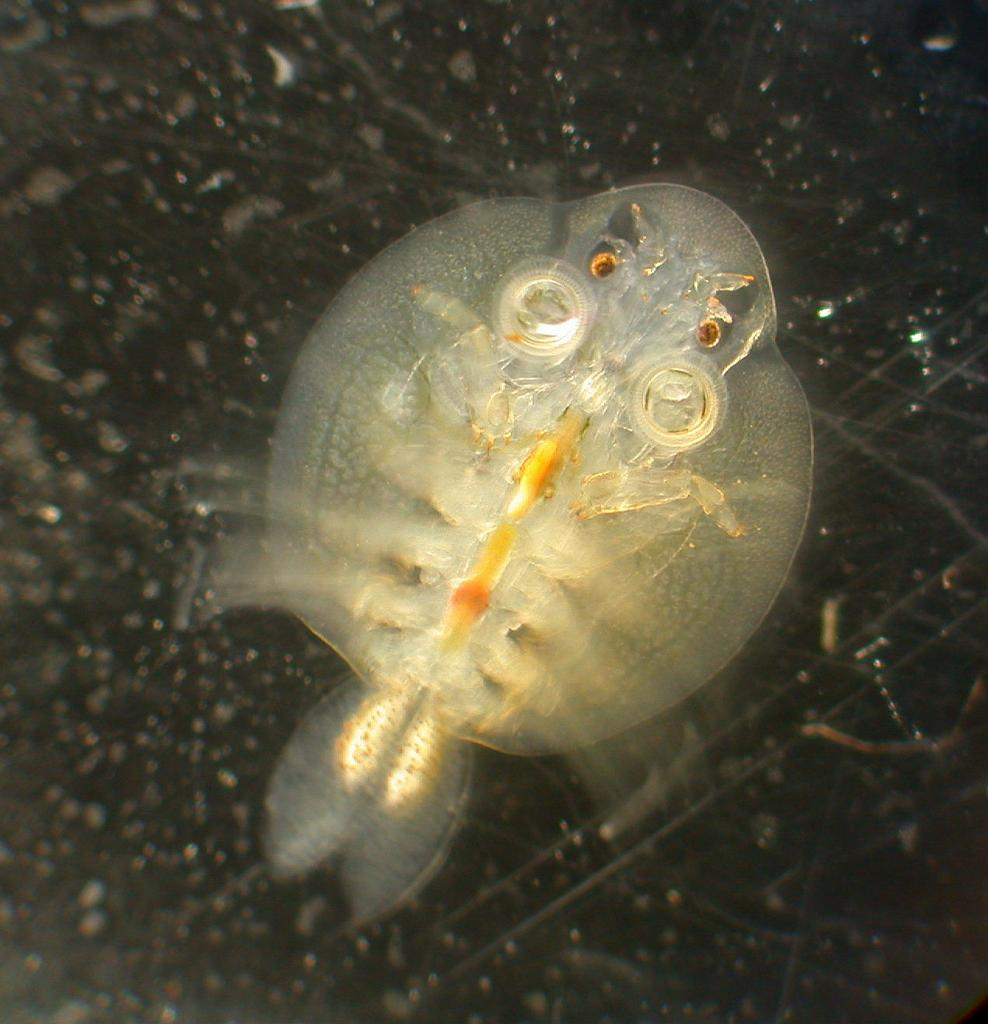
- Argulus coregoni

Scientific classification
- Kingdom: Animalia
- Phylum: Arthropoda
- Class: Ichthyostraca
- Subclass: Branchiura
- Order: Arguloida
- Family: Argulidae
- Genus: Argulus; Müller, 1785

Species
- ~140 species (see list)

= Argulus =

Genus of crustaceans

Argulus is a genus of fish lice in the family Argulidae. There are about 140 accepted species in the genus Argulus. They occur in marine, brackish, and freshwater environments. They sit tightly against the host body, this minimises risk of detachment. As juveniles, these species feed on mucous and skin cells of their host. With age they become blood feeders because the parasite moves from feeding on the fins to feeding on the body of the fish, causing the feeding change. At least some species can have severe impacts on their host populations.

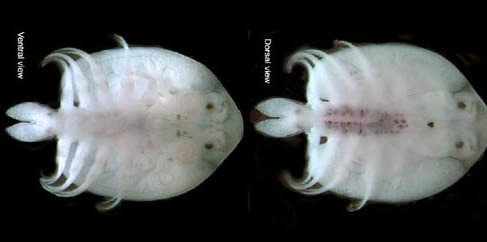
Argulus japonicus

== Taxonomy ==
As of December 2022, 138 species are accepted: List of Argulidae species
