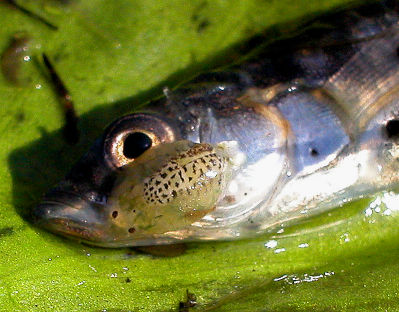
- Argulus sp. on a stickleback

Scientific classification
- Kingdom: Animalia
- Phylum: Arthropoda
- Clade: Pancrustacea
- Class: Ichthyostraca
- Subclass: Branchiura; Thorell, 1864
- Order: Arguloida; Yamaguti, 1963
- Family: Argulidae; Leach, 1819

Genera
- Argulus Müller O.F., 1785; Chonopeltis Thiele, 1900; Dipteropeltis Calman, 1912; Dolops Audouin, 1837

= Argulidae =

Family of crustaceans

The family Argulidae, whose members are commonly known as carp lice or fish lice, (not to be confused with Caligidae, also commonly referred to as sea lice) are parasitic crustaceans in the class Ichthyostraca. It is the only family in the monotypic subclass Branchiura and the order Arguloida, although a second family, Dipteropeltidae, has been proposed.

== Taxonomy ==
Branchiurans were once thought to be copepods but are now recognised as a separate subclass in the superclass Oligostraca due to their distinct morphological characteristics. There are approximately 170 species in four genera recognised in the family Branchiura. The centres of diversity are the Afrotropical and Neotropical realms.

== Description ==
Branchiurans have a flattened, oval body, which is almost entirely covered by a broad, oval carapace, four thoracic segments each with a pair of swimming legs, a pair of anterior compound eyes, and an unsegmented abdomen without appendages which ends in paired abdominal lobes separated by the medial anal cleft. They are compressed dorsoventrally and can vary in size from just a few millimetres to over 30 mm (1.2 in) long, with females usually somewhat larger than the males.

The mandibles are generally toothed hooks in Branchiurans. The maxillules provide sucking capability, and in the genera Argulus, Chonopeltis, and Dipteropeltis, the adults have a pair of suction cups that are from modified first maxillae. The genus Dolops, keeps the larval stages claw-like appendages into adulthood. It is still unknown whether the ancestral state of these organisms had suction discs or the hooked condition seen in Dolops, although it is thought that the specialized suctions discs are a later product of evolution. Also, females tend to be larger than the males. Between the genera there are multiple distinction between the sexes. For example, males in Argulus and Chonopeltis possess secondary sexual modifications on legs 2–4. The sexes both have their own sexual reproductive organs on their abdomens. The females have a spermathecae, while the males have a pair of testes.

Their compound eyes are prominent, and the mouthparts and the first pair of antennae are modified to form a hooked, spiny proboscis armed with suckers, as an adaptation to parasitic life. They have four pairs of thoracic appendages, which are used to swim when not attached to the host.

Not much research has been done on the respiratory system, which lacks gills, but respiratory areas on the carapace and gas exchange through the fleshy abdomen has been suggested.

== Distribution and habitat ==
Branchiurans are widely distributed throughout the world. Most species are found in Africa and South America, and none are found in Antarctica. In North America, the genus Argulus is the only one known to be found in freshwater ecosystems.

== Behaviour and ecology ==
=== Parasitism ===
Branchiurans are obligate ectoparasites that are found primarily on marine and freshwater fish (only the genus Argulus occurs in marine environments), but can also be found on other aquatic organisms such as invertebrates, salamanders, tadpoles and alligators. Some species feed on the blood of their host, while others feed on mucus and extracellular material. Feeding is facilitated by distinct morphological adaptations (see Anatomy). Branchiura are able to attach to hosts through two mechanisms, hooked maxillae (as seen in Dolops) or suction disks. After engorging themselves, the parasites typically wait two to three weeks before feeding again. Mitigation of these parasites has been studied through the use of a treatment containing plant parts. From this study, it is thought that Tobacco leaf dust (containing nicotine) can safely and effectively eliminate adult Branchiurans from fish, although this may be specific to only Argulus bengalensis.

=== Reproduction ===
Only the life cycle of freshwater forms of the genus Argulus is well known. Branchiurans are not permanently attached to their hosts, and leave them for up to three weeks to mate and lay eggs, and reattach behind the fish's operculum, where they feed on mucus and sloughed-off scales, or pierce the skin and feed on the internal fluids. The eggs hatch into parasitic postnauplius larvae. While on their host, Branchiurans mate. The female holds the eggs in the thorax and in some species the eggs can be found inside the lobes of the carapace. The spermathecae on the female stores the sperm. In the genus Dolops, the males deposit a spermatophore onto the females. Once the eggs are fertilized the females leave the host organism to lay their eggs in rows on surfaces of plants, rocks, etc. Like the adults, the larvae are parasites on fish. They are opportunistic in selecting host species of fish, and females are motile in their pursuit of locality of egg-laying. Chonopeltis larvae appear to be less developed than those of the other genera. Members of one group of Argulus hatch as metanauplius-larvae, followed by a juvenile stage. Another Argulus group, and all known species of Dolops, hatch as juveniles.

=== Impact ===
Fish lice occasionally reach high enough densities to cause fish kills in aquaculture operations, or more rarely in wild populations of fish. They can also become abundant in aquaria, sometimes resulting in the death of ornamental fish.
