= List of honeydew sources =

This is a list of honeydew sources. Honeydew is a sugary excretion from plant sap sucking insects such as aphids or scales. There are many trees that are hosts to aphids and scale insects that produce honeydew

== Honeydew sources ==
Common name	Latin name	Country and Comments
Silver fir	Abies alba	Source of German Black Forest honey, Serbia, Kosovo
Bulgarian fir	Abies borisiiregis	Bulgaria
Greek fir	Abies cephalonica	Greece
Maple	Acer spp.	
Hazel	Corylus spp.	
Common hazel	Corylus avellana	Serbia, Kosovo
Turkish filbert	Corylus colurna	Serbia, Kosovo
Hawthorn	Crataegus spp.	
Beech	Fagus sylvatica	Serbia, Kosovo
Ash	Fraxinus excelsior, Fraxinus ornus	
Hickory	Carya spp.	Erratic producer; low quality honey
Eastern juniper	Juniperus virginiana	Honeydew crop rare
Larch	Larix decidua	
Apple	Malus sylvestris	
Red beech	Nothofagus fusca	Source of New Zealand honeydew honey from Ultracoelostoma assimile and Ultracoelostoma brittini
Black beech	Nothofagus solandri	Source of New Zealand honeydew honey from Ultracoelostoma assimile and Ultracoelostoma brittini
Norway spruce	Picea abies	Europe, Serbia, Kosovo, Source of German Black Forest honey
Pine	Pinus spp.	
Turkish pine	Pinus brutia	Source of Turkish honeydew honey from Marchalina hellenica
Aleppo pine	Pinus halepensis	
Mountain pine	Pinus mugo	Serbia, Kosovo
Black pine	Pinus nigra	Serbia, Kosovo
Scots pine	Pinus sylvestris	
White poplar	Populus alba	Serbia, Kosovo
Black poplar	Populus nigra	Serbia, Kosovo
Aspen	Populus tremula	Serbia, Kosovo
Apricot	Prunus armeniaca	
Cherry	Prunus spp.	
Plum	Prunus domestica	
Peach	Prunus persica	
Pear	Pyrus communis	
Oak	Quercus spp.	Spain
Austrian oak	Quercus cerris	Serbia, Kosovo
Oak	Quercus dilatata	Himalaya
Hungarian oak	Quercus frainetto	Serbia, Kosovo
Sessile oak	Quercus petraea	Europe, Serbia, Kosovo
Downy oak	Quercus pubescens	Serbia, Kosovo
Pedunculate oak (English oak)	Quercus robur	Europe, West Asia
Gooseberry	Ribes uva-crispa	
Weeping willow	Salix × sepulcralis 'Chrysocoma'	
Willow	Salix alba	
Rowan	Sorbus aucuparia	
Linden	Tilia spp.	
Small-leaved lime	Tilia cordata	Serbia, Kosovo
Large-leaved lime	Tilia platyphyllos	Serbia, Kosovo
Silver lime	Tilia tomentosa	Serbia, Kosovo
American elm	Ulmus americana	
