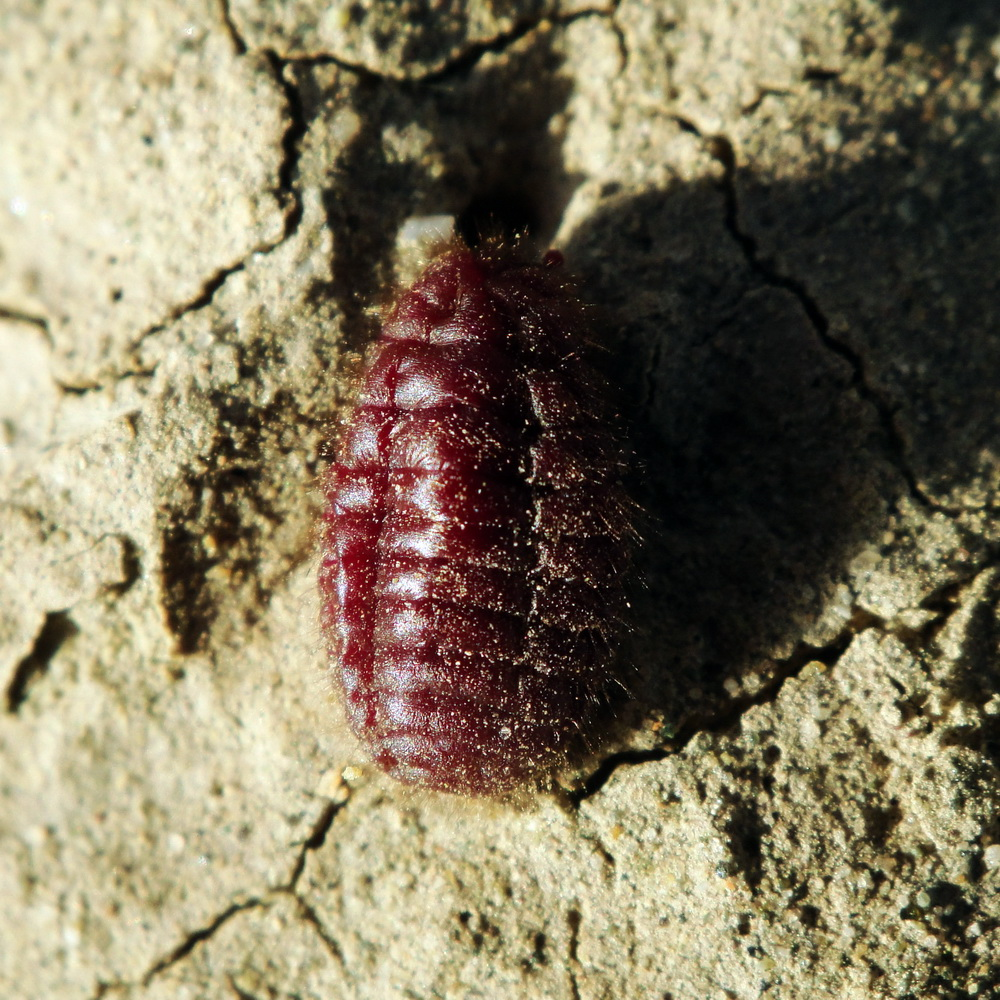
- Female Porphyrophora hamelii

Scientific classification
- Kingdom: Animalia
- Phylum: Arthropoda
- Class: Insecta
- Order: Hemiptera
- Suborder: Sternorrhyncha
- Superfamily: Coccoidea
- Family: Margarodidae; Morrison, 1928

Genera
- See text

Synonyms
- Termitococcidae Jakubski, 1965

= Margarodidae =

Family of true bugs

The Margarodidae (illegitimately as Margodidae) or ground pearls are a family of scale insects within the superfamily Coccoidea. Members of the family include the Polish cochineal and Armenian cochineal (genus Porphyrophora) and the original ground pearl genus, Margarodes. Beginning in 1880, a number of distinct subfamilies were recognized, with the giant coccids (the Monophlebidae) being the first. Although Maskell proposed a new family, many continued to regard the monophlebids as a mere subfamily for many years, and the Margarodidae classification continued to be polyphyletic through the 20th Century. Since then, taking the advice of Koteja several subfamilies and tribes have been elevated into their own families such as Matsucoccidae and Xylococcidae. The pared-down family of Margarodidae (Margarodidae sensu stricto or Margarodidae s. s.) is monophyletic.

== List of genera ==
- Dimargarodes Silvestri, 1938
- Eumargarodes Jakubski, 1950
- Eurhizococcus Silvestri, 1936
- Heteromargarodes Jakubski, 1965
- Margarodes Guilding, 1828
- Margarodesia Foldi, 1981
- Neomargarodes Green, 1914
- Porphyrophora Brandt, 1833
- Promargarodes Silvestri, 1938
- Termitococcus Silvestri, 1901
- Ultracoelostoma Cockerell, 1902

=== Former genera ===
- Crypticerya Cockerell, 1895 now in the Monophlebidae
- Desmococcus McKenzie, 1942 now in the Pityococcidae
- Drosicha Walker, 1858 now in the Monophlebidae
- Gueriniella Fernald, 1903 now in the Monophlebidae
- Icerya Signoret, 1875 now in the Monophlebidae
- Kuwania Cockerell in Fernald, 1903 now in the Kuwaniidae
- Marchalina Vayssiere, 1923 now in the Marchalinidae
- Matsucoccus Cockerell, 1909 now in the Matsucoccidae
- Palaeococcus Cockerell, 1894 now in the Monophlebidae
- Steingelia Nassonov, 1908 now in the Steingeliidae
- Xylococcus Löw, 1883 now in the Xylococcidae

== See also ==
- Callipappidae, former subfamily of the Margarodidae
- Coelostomidiidae, former subfamily of the Margarodidae
