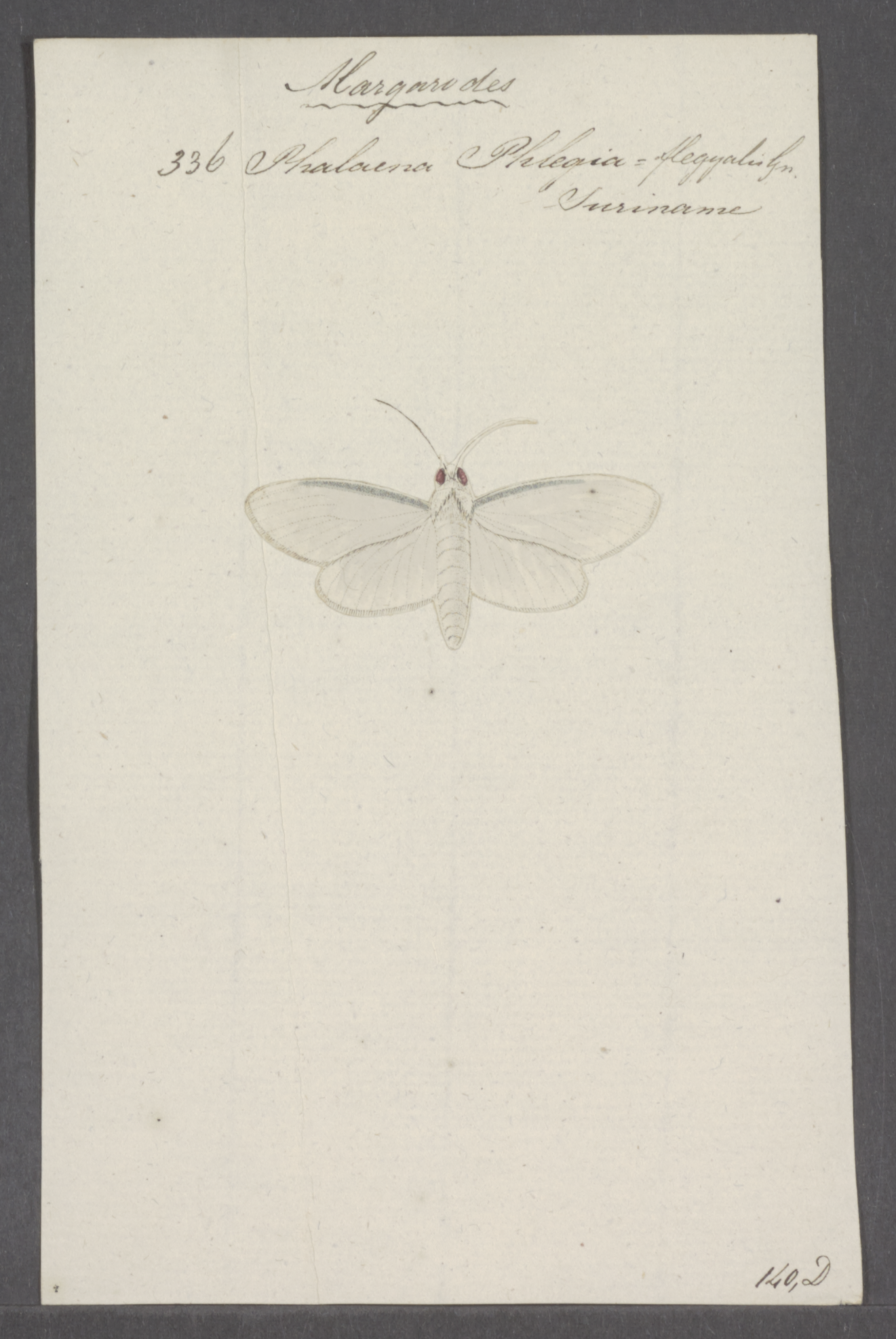
- Illustration of Margarodes

Scientific classification
- Kingdom: Animalia
- Phylum: Arthropoda
- Class: Insecta
- Order: Hemiptera
- Suborder: Sternorrhyncha
- Family: Margarodidae
- Genus: Margarodes; Guilding, 1828

Species
- See text

Synonyms
- Sphaeraspis Giard, 1894

= Margarodes =

Genus of true bugs

Margarodes is a genus of scale insects in the family Margarodidae. The type species is Margarodes formicarum. The genus was erected in 1828 by Lansdown Guilding who found these waxy "pearls" in the soil on the island of Bahama, associated with ants, and named a species Margarodes formicarum.

== Species ==
- Margarodes aurelianus Hall, 1945
- Margarodes australis Jakubski, 1965
- Margarodes basrahensis Jakubski, 1965
- Margarodes capensis Giard, 1897
- Margarodes carvalhoi Costa, 1950
- Margarodes chukar La, 1967
- Margarodes congolensis Jakubski, 1965
- Margarodes dactyloides McDaniel, 1966
- Margarodes floridanus Jakubski, 1965
- Margarodes formicarum Guilding, 1829
- Margarodes gallicus Signoret, 1876
- Margarodes gimenezi Podtiaguin, 1941
- Margarodes greeni Brain, 1915
- Margarodes morrisoni McDaniel, 1965
- Margarodes newsteadi Brain, 1915
- Margarodes papillosus Green, 1912
- Margarodes paulistus Silvestri, 1939
- Margarodes peringueyi Brain, 1915
- Margarodes perrisii Signoret, 1876
- Margarodes prieskaensis Jakubski, 1965
- Margarodes rileyi Giard, 1897
- Margarodes ruber Brain, 1915
- Margarodes salisburiensis Hall, 1940
- Margarodes similis Morrison, 1924
- Margarodes sinensis Silvestri, 1938
- Margarodes trimeni Giard, 1897
- Margarodes upingtonensis De, 1983
- Margarodes vitis Philippi, 1884
- Margarodes vredendalensis De, 1983
- Margarodes williamsi Jakubski, 1965

=== Former species ===
==== Scale ====
- Margarodes hameli Cockerell, 1902 now Porphyrophora hamelii
- Margarodes meridionalis Morrison, 1927 now Dimargarodes meridionalis
- Margarodes polonicus Cockerell, 1902 now Porphyrophora polonica

==== Moths ====
- Margarodes beryllalis (Margarodes beryttalis) Guenée, 1854 now Stemorrhages sericea
- Margarodes exaula Meyrick, 1888 now Stemorrhages exaula
- Margarodes indica now Diaphania indica
- Margarodes nigropunctalis Bremer, 1864 now Palpita nigropunctalis
- Margarodes sericeolalis Guenée, 1862 now Stemorrhages sericea
