= Matsucoccus matsumurae =

Scientific classification
- Kingdom: Animalia
- Phylum: Arthropoda
- Clade: Pancrustacea
- Class: Insecta
- Order: Hemiptera
- Suborder: Sternorrhyncha
- Family: Matsucoccidae
- Genus: Matsucoccus
- Species: M. matsumurae

Binomial name
- Matsucoccus matsumurae (Kuwana, 1905)

Species of insect

Matsucoccus matsumurae, the red pine scale or pine bast scale, is a species of scale insect. It is native to Japan. It is an invasive species in North America, where it is a destructive pest of the red pine.
