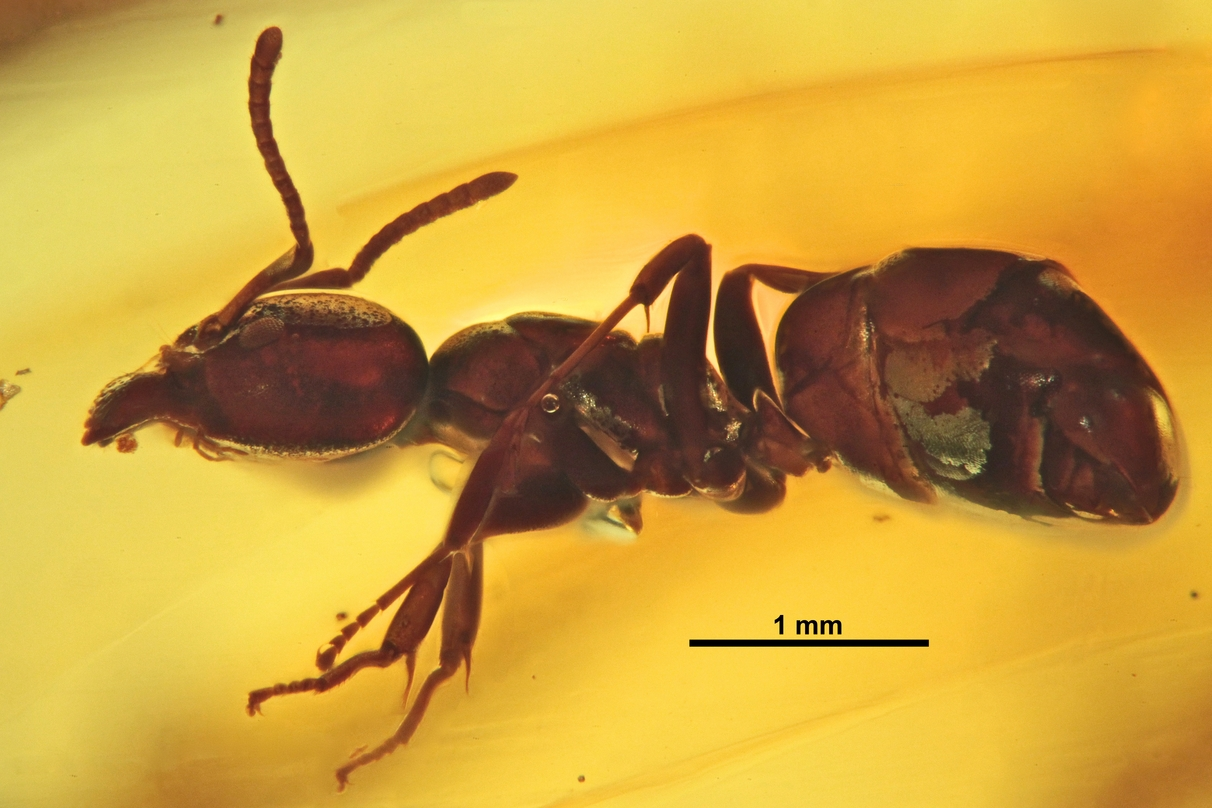
- †Ctenobethylus goepperti worker in amber

Scientific classification
- Kingdom: Animalia
- Phylum: Arthropoda
- Clade: Pancrustacea
- Class: Insecta
- Order: Hymenoptera
- Family: Formicidae
- Clade: Dolichoderomorpha
- Subfamily: Dolichoderinae
- Tribe: Tapinomini
- Genus: †Ctenobethylus; Brues, 1939

Type species
- Hypoclinea goepperti (Mayr, 1868)

Diversity
- 2 species

Synonyms
- Eldermyrmex Shattuck, 2011; Bothriomyrmex goepperti (Mayr, 1868); Ctenobethylus bogdassarovi (Nazaraw, 1994); Ctenobethylus exsectus (Dubovikoff & Dlussky, 2019); Ctenobethylus succinalis Brues, 1939; Eldermyrmex exsectus Dubovikoff & Dlussky, 2019; Hypoclinea goepperti Mayr, 1868; Iridomyrmex bogdassarovi Nazaraw, 1994; Iridomyrmex goepperti (Mayr, 1868); Liometopum bogdassarovi (Nazaraw, 1994); Liometopum goepperti (Mayr, 1868)

= Ctenobethylus =

Ctenobethylus Temporal range: Middle Eocene Baltic amber

Genus of ants

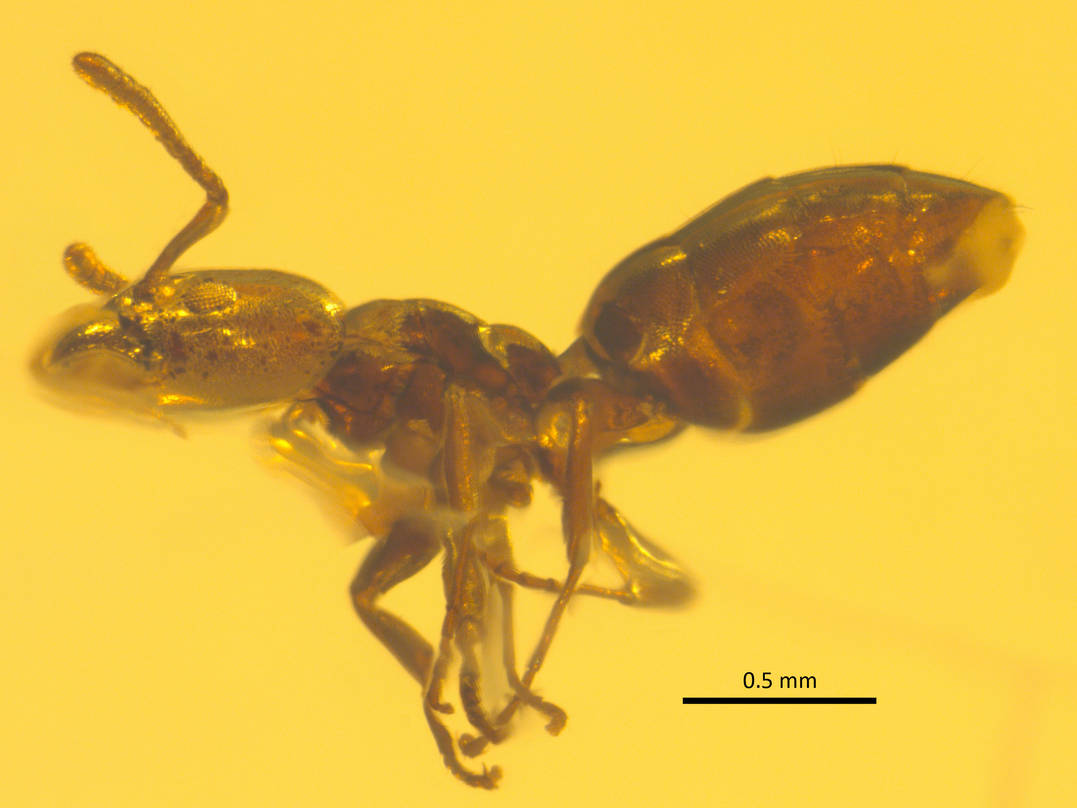
Ctenobethylus goepperti

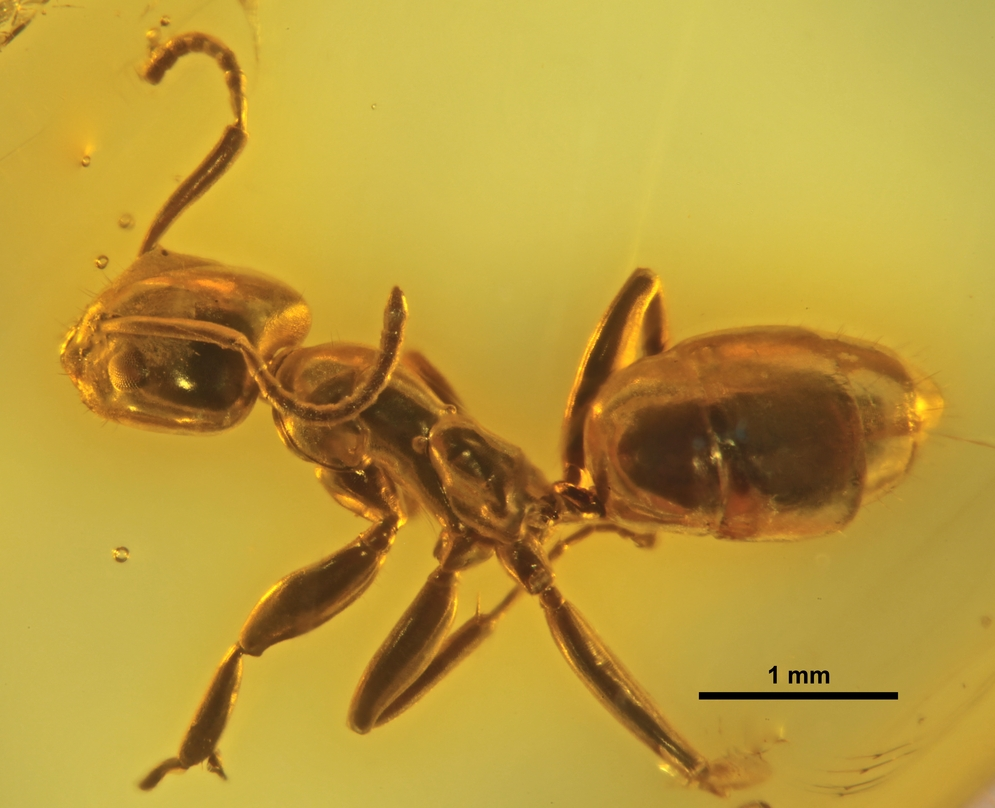
Ctenobethylus oblongiceps

Ctenobethylus is an extinct genus of ants in the subfamily Dolichoderinae. The genus contains two described species as of 2026, both known from various Eocene European amber deposits.

Ctenobethylus goepperti is a species of extinct dolichoderine ant found in numerous Eocene amber deposits in northern Europe. It is thought to be closely related to Liometopum, and hypothesized to have a relatively similar ecology with wood-nesting habits, arboreal ecological dominance, association with aphids, and large colonies. They are one of the most commonly encountered ant species in Baltic and Rovno amber, and were prevalent during the Eocene epoch around 40 million years ago.

== Species ==
As of 2026, Ctenobethylus contains two valid described species, both extinct.

- †Ctenobethylus goepperti (Mayr, 1868)
- †Ctenobethylus oblongiceps (Wheeler, 1915)

== Taxonomy ==
The genus Ctenobethylus was established in 1939 by Charles Thomas Brues as a genus of bethylid wasps. Fossils were reported from 25 collections across Europe, including Germany, Lithuania, Poland, Russia, and Ukraine, spanning the Priabonian of the upper Eocene to the Rupelian of the lower Oligocene (38–28.1 Ma). In early 2026, Eldermyrmex was synonymized under Ctenobethylus, therefore inserting the species Ctenobethylus oblongiceps into the genus.

Ctenobethylus goepperti has a long taxonomic history dating back to 1868 when it was initially described as Hypoclinea goepperti by entomologist Gustav Mayr. Since then, it has accumulated a large number of synonyms, namely C. bogdassarovi, C. exsectus, and C. succinalis. After a series of earlier generic transfers to the genera Bothriomyrmex, Iridomyrmex, and Liometopum, C. goepperti was officially transferred to the genus Ctenobethylus in 1997 by Russian paleontologist Gennady Dlussky where it belongs today, and was formerly the sole species of Ctenobethylus from 2002 onwards until Eldermyrmex was merged into it in 2026, adding C. oblongiceps to the genus as well. The genus Ctenobethylus is currently placed within tribe Tapinomini of the subfamily Dolichoderinae based on morphological evidence with analysis of C. goepperti specimens, and thought to be a stem group to the extant Holarctic dolichoderine genus Liometopum.

William Morton Wheeler first described Ctenobethylus oblongiceps in 1915, commenting that the ant did not have the appearance of typical Iridomyrmex but found nowhere else to assign it, so he left the species incertae sedis within the genus. Because of its appearance, it was obvious the ant did not belong to the Iridomyrmex, and so it was transferred to a new genus Eldermyrmex in 2011. However, the species was again transferred in 2026 as Eldermyrmex was synonymized with Ctenobethylus, connecting C. oblongiceps with a tribal affiliation to the Tapinomini.

=== Etymology ===
The scientific binomial name Ctenobethylus goepperti is composed of the generic name and the specific name. The genus Ctenobethylus means "comb wasp" from Ancient Greek cteno- (κτείς, "comb") and bethylus (βηθύλος, a type of bird, later applied to a family of wasps), as the original describer of the genus, entomologist Charles Thomas Brues believed it to be a bethylid wasp. The specific epithet is named after Prussian paleontologist Johann Heinrich Robert Göppert.

== Morphology ==
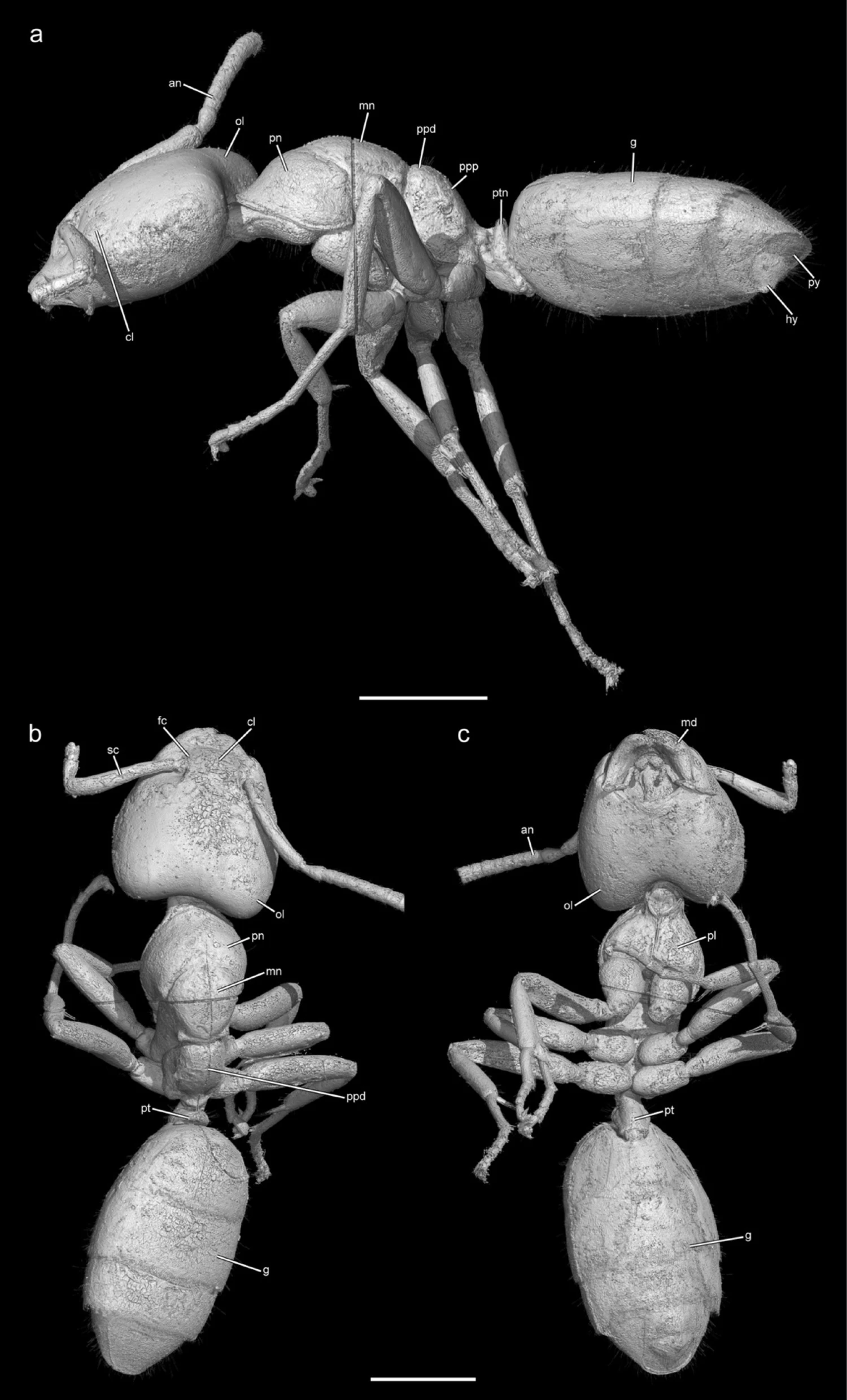
Solid 3D render of Ctenobethylus goepperti from Goethe's amber collection

Morphologically, males have a blackish-brown body with pale wings, a rounded head with prominent eyes and three ocelli, a short scape, and a 13-segmented funicle. The thorax is rounded, legs are long and brownish, and the abdomen is subspherical. Total length ranges from 3 mm (male) to 6.25 mm (wingless female).

Ctenobethylus is characterized by a heart-shaped head with prominent rear lobes and forward-positioned eyes. The frontal carinae are sharp and widely spaced, and the front edge of the clypeus is straight. The antennal scapes are short and do not reach the back of the head. The body is compact, with a relatively long mesonotum and a propodeum whose upper surface is clearly shorter than its rear surface in side view. The petiole forms a thin, distinct node without an extended posterior projection. Within the genus, the species may be separated from C. oblongiceps by the lack of these characters: a subrectangular head with eyes low and lateral on head capsule, a longitudinal ridge separating the top and side surfaces of a low propodeum, and a broad cone-shaped petiolar node.

Ctenobethylus goepperti exhibits all known traits of the subfamily Dolichoderinae, including the presence of a slit-like gastral orifice and a one-segmented waist consisting of a single petiole. The workers of Ctenobethylus goepperti are polymorphic. The head is trapezoidal with gently curved sides and a shallowly indented rear margin, while the antennal scape is short and does not reach the rear head edge. The eyes are set forward, and ocelli are absent in all workers. The mandibles bear seven to ten teeth, with the terminal teeth largest and sharp, while the remaining teeth become more blunt in larger individuals. Their maxillary palps have six segments and extend about halfway toward the back of the head. The mesosoma shows a narrow but distinct mesopropodeal depression. The propodeum is smoothly rounded in profile, with a short dorsal face and a longer, sloping posterior face; the spiracles are positioned near the transition between the side and rear surfaces. The petiole forms an inclined scale that is longer anteriorly than posteriorly, and from above four abdominal segments are visible. The first abdominal segment is slightly flattened at its front but does not overhang the petiole. All three major forms of this species, the worker, male, and queen, have been discovered and described in detail.

== Ecology ==
A specimen from Johann Wolfgang von Goethe's amber collection was examined using synchrotron micro-computed Phylogenetic analysis suggests that Ctenobethylus is closely related to the modern arboreal genus Liometopum and likely a dominant Eocene forest ant. One fossil specimen of C. goepperti contained a preserved mesostigmatid mite attached to the head of the ant, which is perhaps the oldest known evidence of ecological association between mites and ants.

Ctenobethylus goepperti is thought to have been a dominant member of the warm-temperate and humid forests of Eocene Europe, an ecosystem now obsolete due to long-term climate change at the end of the Eocene epoch. Due to their likely arboreal habits and ecological dominance, they are one of the most abundant and commonly encountered ant species found in both Baltic and Rovno amber, constituting over half of all known ant specimens found in the amber. They are thought to have been aggressive, territorial arboreal ants similar to their relatives in the genus Liometopum. They may have formed large colonies, and likely constructed large carton nests in trees. Their robust head shape, musculature, and mandibles allowed them to excavate wood and build nests within the wood.

=== Associations with other organisms ===
There is evidence that these ants built roads to aphid colonies on conifers. They have been found together with Matsucoccus scale insects of the family Matsucoccidae in Rovno amber, in one of the few recorded cases of amber syninclusion between ants and scale insects, and the interaction is thought to be purely predatory as Matsucoccus species do not possess the mouthparts necessary to extract honeydew. C. goepperti has also commonly been syninclusive with Germaraphis aphids in numerous European amber deposits like Rovno and Saxonian amber, suggesting an association between these ants and the aphids. Additionally, a yet undescribed mesostigmatid mite of the laelapid genus Myrmozercon has been found encased in amber together with a C. goepperti ant, strongly suggesting a parasitic relationship as the mite's closest extant relatives are also strictly myrmecophilous parasites. This record offers the oldest known evidence of a close ecological relationship between mesostigmatid mites and eusocial Hymenoptera, originating at least 44 to 49 million years ago.

== Discovery in Goethe's amber collection ==
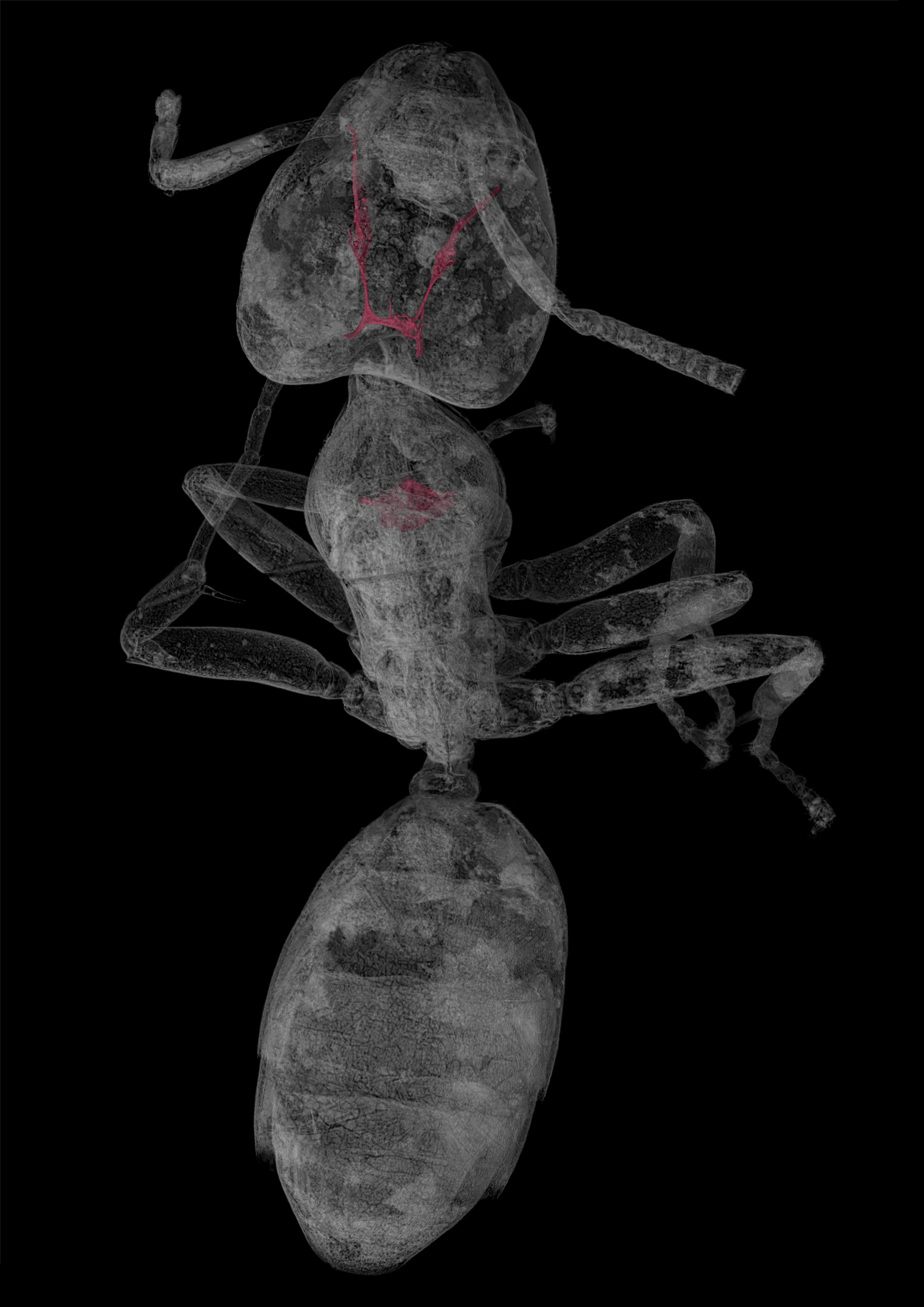
Transparent 3D render of Ctenobethylus goepperti from Goethe's amber collection

Notably, one well-preserved specimen of C. goepperti was found in German polymath Johann Wolfgang von Goethe's amber collection consisting of 42 amber pieces, 40 of which may be reliably located as of 2026. These amber pieces contained in total three major biological inclusions, namely the ant, a sciarid fungus gnat, and a black fly. The specimen was imaged in great detail with synchrotron-based micro-computed tomography to create a detailed three-dimensional model of the ant, the first one constructed of the species. This process revealed meticulous internal anatomical and skeletal structures in the head and thorax previously unknown in these ants. Goethe himself was unaware that his own amber collection included preserved insects and did not comment much on its potential for bioinclusions, although he did realize that the material is valuable for paleontology.
