= Crypticerya zeteki =

Scientific classification
- Kingdom: Animalia
- Phylum: Arthropoda
- Class: Insecta
- Order: Hemiptera
- Suborder: Sternorrhyncha
- Family: Monophlebidae
- Genus: Crypticerya
- Species: C. zeteki

Binomial name
- Crypticerya zeteki (Cockerell, 1914)

Synonyms
- Icerya zeteki Cockerell, 1914

Species of insect

Crypticerya zeteki is a species of Sternorrhyncha in the family Monophlebidae.

According to Gerald A. Kerkut the species is might be similar to Icerya purchasi.

As of 2008 it was one of the three insect species where hermaphroditism occurs. All females in this species become hermaphrodites. Males at times come from unfertilized eggs.
