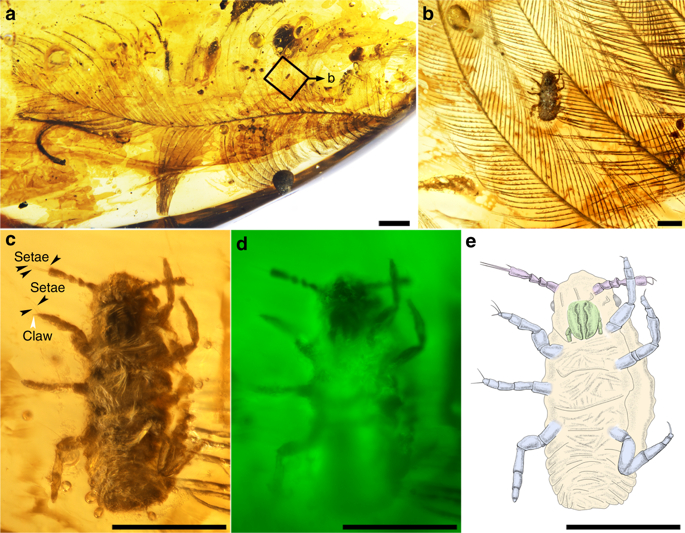
- Paratype specimen

Scientific classification
- Kingdom: Animalia
- Phylum: Arthropoda
- Class: Insecta
- Order: Hemiptera
- Suborder: Sternorrhyncha
- Family: Xylococcidae
- Genus: †Mesophthirus; Gao et al., 2019
- Species: †M. engeli

Binomial name
- †Mesophthirus engeli Gao et al., 2019

= Mesophthirus =

Mesophthirus Temporal range: Cenomanian

Extinct genus of insects

Mesophthirus is an extinct genus of insect known from Burmese amber from Myanmar during the mid-Cretaceous period, about 100 million years ago. Its sole species, Mesophthirus engeli, is known from multiple specimens preserved with feathers of dinosaurs. It was originally considered that Mesophthirus fed on the feather as evidenced from the damaged dinosaur feathers preserved with it. However, later studies considered it as nymphal scale insect, probably belongs to Xylococcidae, and not a parasitic insect that fed on feather.

== Description ==
Mesophthirus engeli is only known from nymphs, and adults of this insect is unknown. Up to 229 μm long, it has tiny eyes, short legs, short antenna and no wings. Its claws and antenna are covered in long, stiff bristles. Its overall body shape is oval to oblong, with no constriction between head, thorax, and abdomen. It was originally considered to have huge mandibles with at least four teeth. However, this is later found to be a misidentification, and it actually have sucking mouthpart instead. In addition, its claws are not specialized like a lice, rather are identical to those of scale insects.

== Classification ==
Although only known from nymphs, according to overall morphology it was originally considered to have characters shared with Liposcelidae and Phthiraptera. However, in 2021 it was considered as scale insect instead, as multiple characters suggested. In 2022 it was classified to scale insect family Xylococcidae, although authors of original description still supported its identification as lice-like insect.

== Paleoecology ==
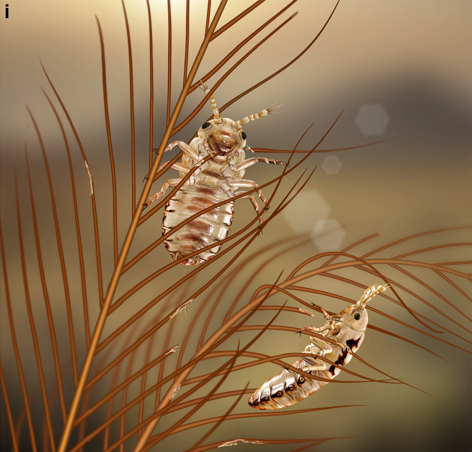
Outdated reconstruction of Mesophthirus as feather-feeding lice-like insect

Mesophthirus specimens have been found with damaged dinosaur feathers. Original description suggested that morphology of insects and damaged feathers show that those insects fed on feathers. This interpretation was denied in 2021 as it actually lacked chewing mandibles. As scale insect nymph, it climbed on plants leaf litter, tree trunks, and even fallen feathers. Damaged feathers would be eaten by dermestid beetle nymphs instead. In 2022, it was considered that wind transport caused multiple nymphs on the same feather. Its small size and very long femoral setae are adapted for aerial dispersal. These nymphs probably climbed on feathers caught on the bark and fluttering in the wind, and used it to travel to another trunks, like "magic carpet".
