= Callipappus australis =

Bird of paradise fly

Scientific classification
- Kingdom: Animalia
- Phylum: Arthropoda
- Clade: Pancrustacea
- Class: Insecta
- Order: Hemiptera
- Suborder: Sternorrhyncha
- Family: Callipappidae
- Genus: Callipappus
- Species: C. australis

Binomial name
- Callipappus australis (Maskell, 1890)

Species of true bug

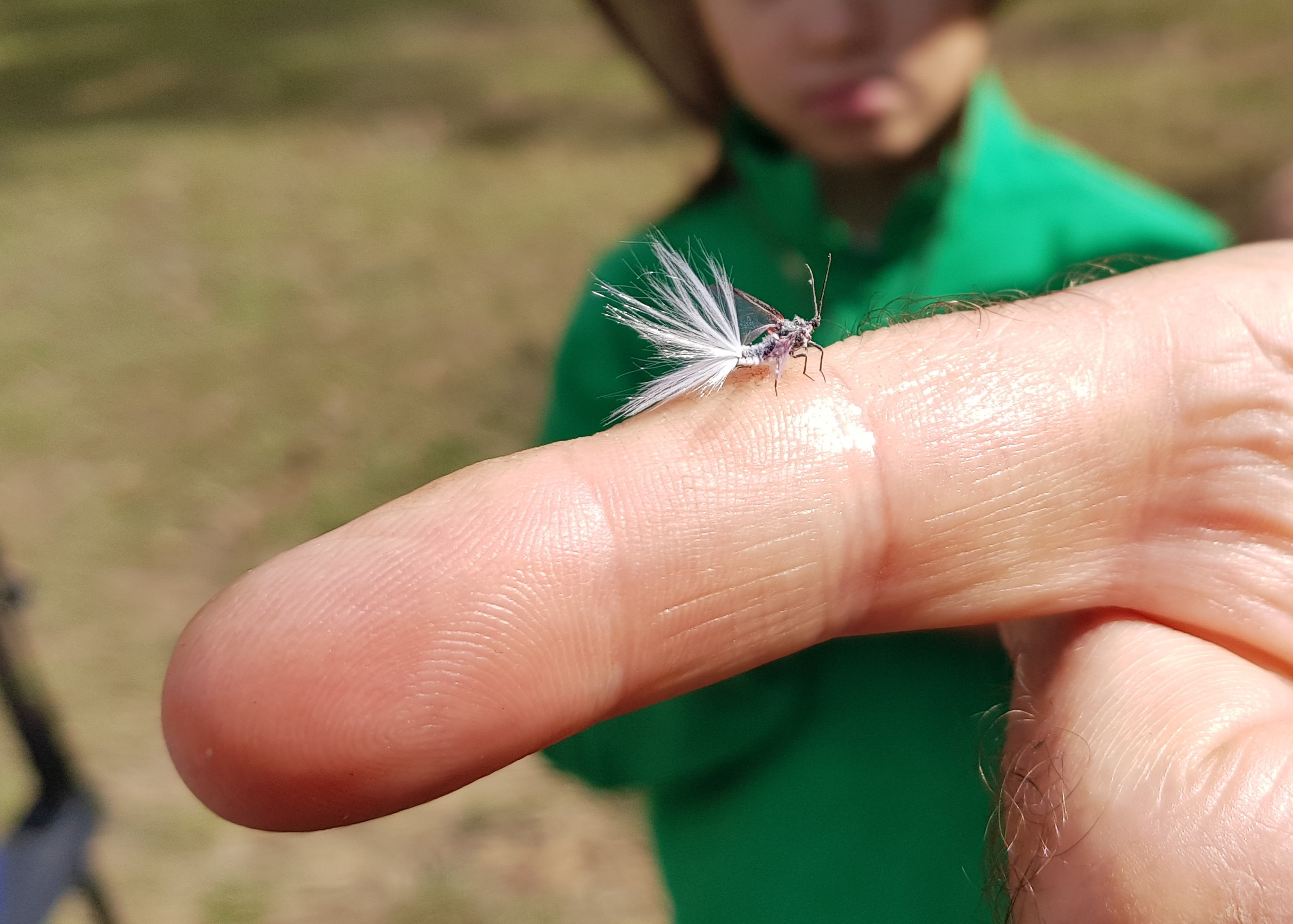

Callipappus australis, commonly known as the bird of paradise fly, is a species of scale insect in the family Callipappidae. It is native to Australia where it occurs in Queensland and New South Wales.

== Description ==
The bird of paradise fly exhibits sexual dimorphism. The adult female is up to about 2 cm (0.8 in) in length and a dark bluish-black or purplish colour. It is an elongated oval in shape with a plump, domed appearance. It has three pairs of legs, but no wings. The adult male in contrast is much smaller and resembles a fly. It has a slender, violet-coloured body, three pairs of legs, a pair of translucent wings and a tuft of long glassy white waxen filaments protruding from the tip of the abdomen.

== Distribution ==
This species of scale insect is native to Australia where it occurs in Queensland and New South Wales.

== Biology ==
Adult males and females emerge from the ground in the autumn. The female climbs up a tree, post or any other vertical surface and this is where mating takes place. After mating, the female attaches herself to a surface and invaginates her abdomen, creating a "marsupium" in which she lays a batch of eggs. She dies soon thereafter, her cuticle making a leathery protective casing for the eggs. The first instar nymphs, known as crawlers, descend to the ground and attach themselves to the roots of plants by inserting their piercing mouthparts. A waxen cyst forms around them. Their plant hosts include Banksia and probably Xanthorrhoea and other mallee, woodland and heathland plants. The feeding stages live entirely underground, sucking sap from roots, but their range of host plants has not been fully elucidated; the type specimens were found on the trunk of Angophora, but it is quite likely that this is not a host plant, and merely provides an elevated position for breeding activities.
