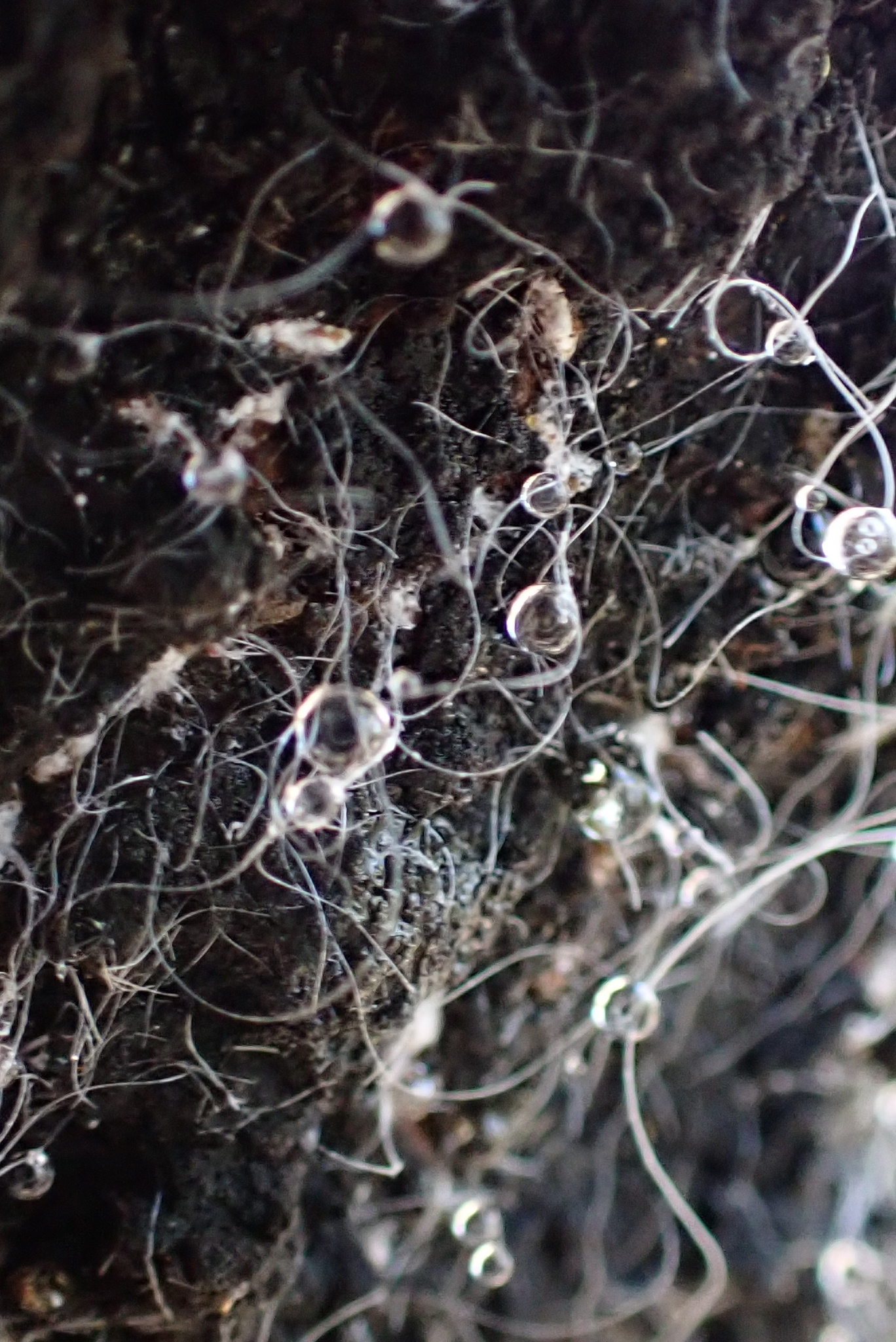
- Ultracoelostoma brittini near Castle Hill, New Zealand

Scientific classification
- Kingdom: Animalia
- Phylum: Arthropoda
- Class: Insecta
- Order: Hemiptera
- Suborder: Sternorrhyncha
- Family: Margarodidae
- Genus: Ultracoelostoma
- Species: U. brittini

Binomial name
- Ultracoelostoma brittini Morales, 1991

= Ultracoelostoma brittini =

Species of insect

Ultracoelostoma brittini, also known as sooty beech scale, is a species of scale insect. It is endemic to New Zealand.

== Range ==
This species is known from the South Island of New Zealand. Its congener, Ultracoelostoma assimile is largely known from the North Island, while U. dracophylli inhabits higher mountain elevations on the South Island and on the southern part of the island, as well some of the outlying islands, like the Chathams and the subantarctic islands of New Zealand.

== Habitat ==
Ultracoelostoma brittini uses southern beeches (Nothofagus sp.) as their main host. Unlike U. assimile, which is often found on the branches of its host, U. brittini is mainly found on the trunk. The main species are black beech and mountain beech, although they are also sometimes found on other species such as Pterophylla sylvicola and Laurelia novaezelandiae.

== Ecology ==
Scale insects are obligate parasites. These species tap into the beech tree to eat phloem, which they then excrete as honeydew from anal tubes. This honeydew in turn is used as food for both sooty mould, as well as for insects and other larger animals such as birds, such as Yellow-crowned Parakeet.

== Etymology ==
Brittini was named after a Mr G. Brittin, who was a New Zealand amateur entomologist who worked on Coccoidea in the early 1900s. Brittin also collected the holotype.
