= Xylococcus =

The scientific name Xylococcus may refer to:

- Xylococcus (insect), a scale insect genus
- Xylococcus (plant), a plant genus
