= Desmococcus =

Desmococcus is the scientific name of two genera of organisms and may refer to:

- Desmococcus (alga), a genus of algae in the family Prasiolaceae
- Desmococcus (insect), a genus of scale insects in the family Pityococcidae
