= Nautococcus =

Nautococcus may refer to:

- Nautococcus (bug), a genus of bugs in the family Margarodidae
- Nautococcus (alga), a genus of algae in the family Chlorococcaceae
