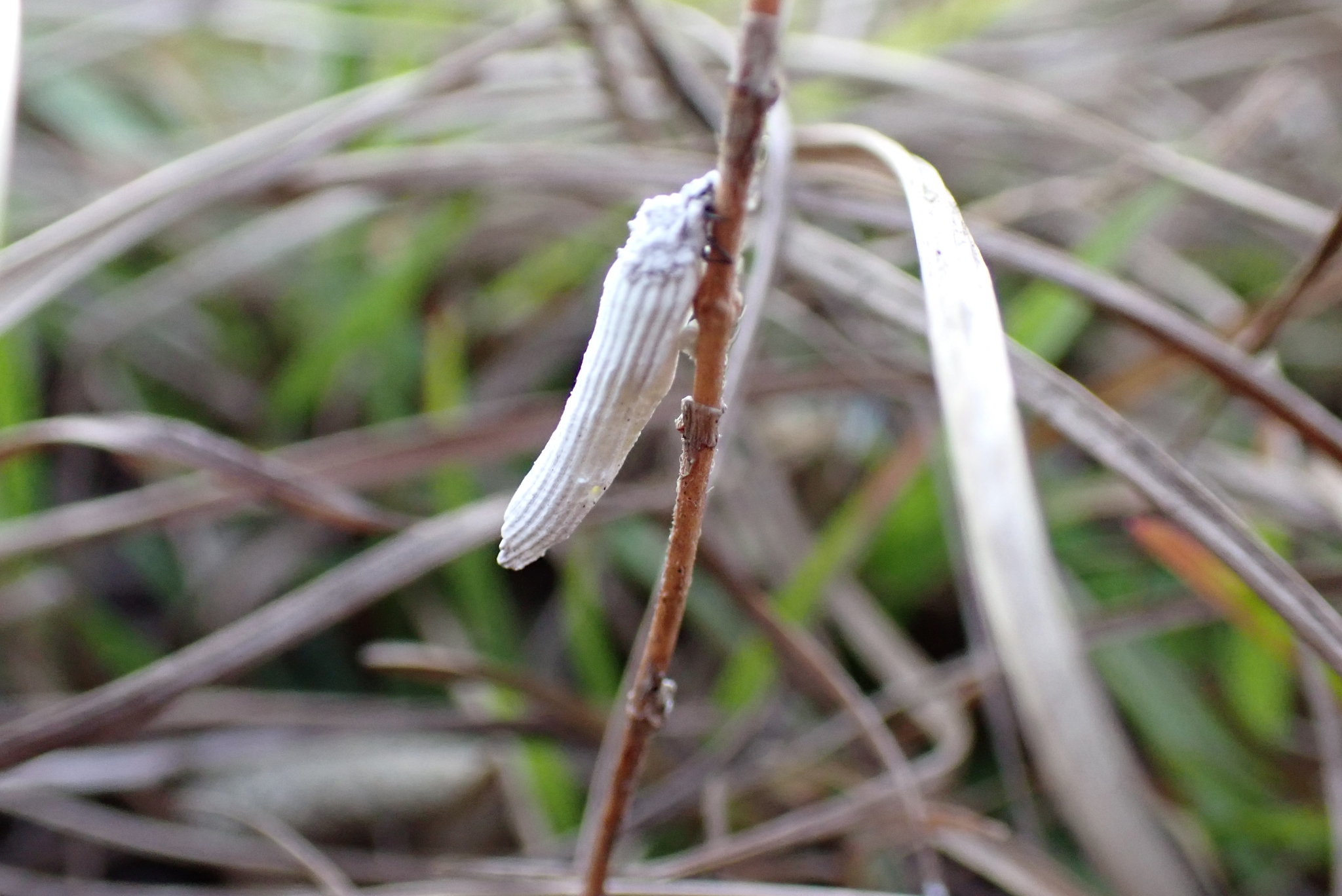
- Adult female in Florida in 2024

Scientific classification
- Domain: Eukaryota
- Kingdom: Animalia
- Phylum: Arthropoda
- Class: Insecta
- Order: Hemiptera
- Suborder: Sternorrhyncha
- Family: Monophlebidae
- Genus: Crypticerya
- Species: C. genistae

Binomial name
- Crypticerya genistae Hempel, 1912

Synonyms
- Icerya genistae Hempel 1912

= Crypticerya genistae =

Species of insect

Crypticerya genistae is a species of giant scale insect in the tribe Iceryini. Adult females somewhat resemble the widespread Icerya purchasi (cottony cushion scale), having a light orange body, black legs and a white fluted ovisac. However the ovisac is much larger, measuring 0.66–0.75 inches (17–19 mm), and is held either erect of parallel to the host plant. They are very similar in appearance to Icerya rileyi and Icerya littoralis.

Native to South America (including Brazil), C. genistae was accidentally introduced to Florida by 2005 and to the Cayman Islands by 2006.
