= Stemorrhages thetydalis =

Scientific classification
- Kingdom: Animalia
- Phylum: Arthropoda
- Class: Insecta
- Order: Lepidoptera
- Family: Crambidae
- Genus: Stemorrhages
- Species: S. thetydalis

Binomial name
- Stemorrhages thetydalis (Guenée, 1854)

Synonyms
- Margarodes thetydalis Guenée, 1854

Species of moth

Stemorrhages thetydalis is a moth in the family Crambidae. It was described by Achille Guenée in 1854. It is found on Tahiti.
