= Pine honey =

Type of honeydew honey

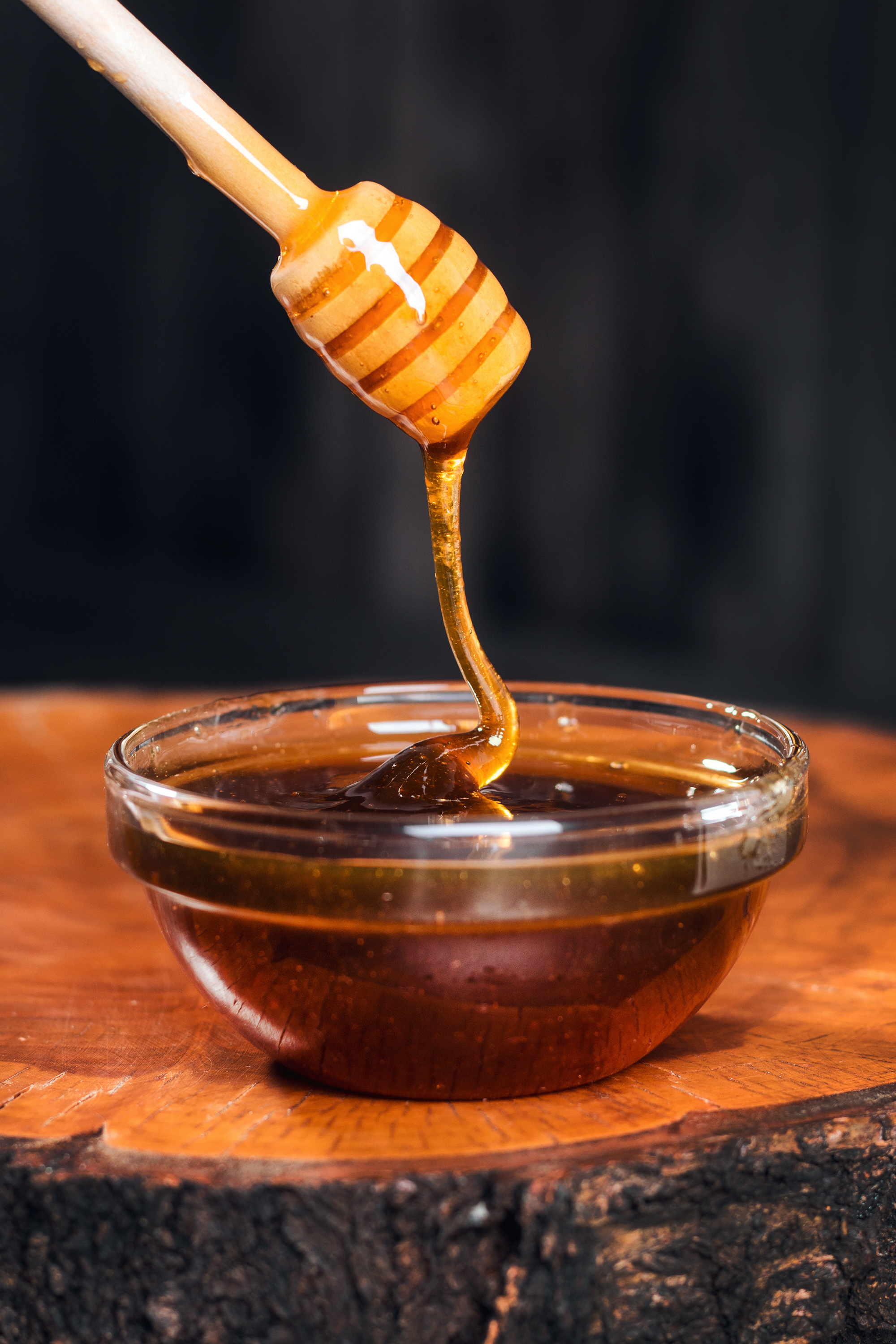
Macedonian pine honey

Pine honey (Greek: πευκόμελο, romanized: pefkomelo; Turkish: çam balı) is a type of honeydew honey. It is a sweet and spicy honey, with some woody notes, a resinous fragrance and dark amber color. It is a common breakfast dish in Turkey and Greece, where it is drizzled over kaymak and eaten with bread.

Pine honey is an unusual honey, because it is not produced entirely by honey bees. It is produced by bees that collect honeydew (sugary secretions) from a scale insect species called Marchalina hellenica, which lives on the sap of certain pine trees. The M. hellenica can be found on the Turkish pine (Pinus brutia), as well as the Aleppo pine (P. halepensis), Austrian pine (P. nigra), Scots pine (P. sylvestris), and stone pine (P. pinea).

Pine honey is commonly produced anywhere pine forests are plentiful and conventional honey sources, such as flowers or fruit tree blossoms, are few. It can be found in some heavily forested areas of Germany, Norway, Italy, New Zealand, and the United States but is primarily produced in the pine forests of the eastern Mediterranean. Major production occurs in Turkey, the Middle East, the Balkans, and many Greek mountains and islands. The monastic communities at Mount Athos in Greece are renowned for their pine honey production and throughout Greece pine honey makes up 60–65% of total honey production. Turkey produces 92% of the world’s pine honey. Muğla Province accounts for 80% of Turkish pine honey production.

Pine honey is known for its antiseptic properties and helping with respiratory issues.
