= Nautococcus (bug) =

Scientific classification
- Domain: Eukaryota
- Kingdom: Animalia
- Phylum: Arthropoda
- Class: Insecta
- Order: Hemiptera
- Suborder: Sternorrhyncha
- Family: Margarodidae
- Genus: Nautococcus; Vayssière, 1939

Genus of insects

Nautococcus is a genus of true bugs belonging to the family Margarodidae.

Species:

- Nautococcus schraderae Vayssière, 1939
