= Eurhizococcus =

Scientific classification
- Domain: Eukaryota
- Kingdom: Animalia
- Phylum: Arthropoda
- Class: Insecta
- Order: Hemiptera
- Suborder: Sternorrhyncha
- Family: Margarodidae
- Genus: Eurhizococcus; Silvestri, 1936

Genus of insects

Eurhizococcus is a genus of true bugs belonging to the family Margarodidae.

The species of this genus are found in South America.

Species:

- Eurhizococcus brasiliensis (Wille, 1922)
- Eurhizococcus brevicornis (Silvestri, 1901)
- Eurhizococcus colombianus Jakubski, 1965
