= Stemorrhages marthesiusalis =

Scientific classification
- Kingdom: Animalia
- Phylum: Arthropoda
- Class: Insecta
- Order: Lepidoptera
- Family: Crambidae
- Genus: Stemorrhages
- Species: S. marthesiusalis

Binomial name
- Stemorrhages marthesiusalis (Walker, 1859)

Synonyms
- Margaronia marthesiusalis Walker, 1859; Margarodes nereis Meyrick, 1887; Margarones tritonias Meyrick, 1887

Species of moth

Stemorrhages marthesiusalis is a moth in the family Crambidae. It was described by Francis Walker in 1859. It is found in India, Sri Lanka and Australia, where it has been recorded from Queensland.

The wingspan is 52–54 mm. The forewings pale ochreous greenish, irrorated (sprinkled) with green whitish, especially on the veins posteriorly, with prismatic reflections. There is a moderate ferruginous costal streak, becoming rapidly paler beyond the middle and reduced to a slender line along the costal edge beyond two-thirds. It is bordered beneath throughout by a moderate suffused white streak, becoming less defined and more greenish white posteriorly. There is a blackish transverse-linear discal dot and a hind marginal series of black dots between the veins. The hindwings have the same colour as the forewings, but this is somewhat obscured by numerous whitish hairs, becoming denser towards the base. The hindmarginal dots are as in the forewings, but more elongate transversely.
