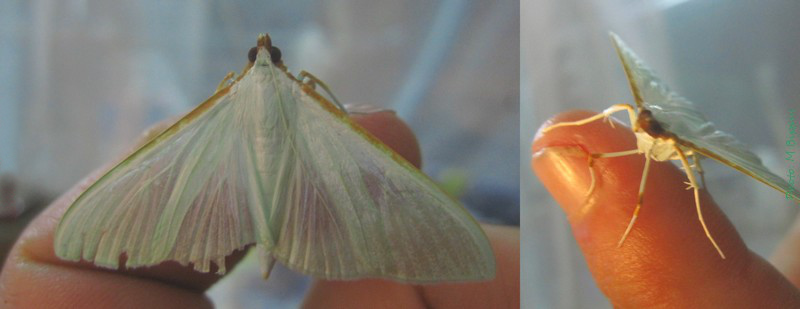
- Stemorrhages sericea

Scientific classification
- Kingdom: Animalia
- Phylum: Arthropoda
- Clade: Pancrustacea
- Class: Insecta
- Order: Lepidoptera
- Family: Crambidae
- Tribe: Margaroniini
- Genus: Stemorrhages; Lederer, 1863

Synonyms
- Stemmorhages

= Stemorrhages =

Genus of moths

Stemorrhages is a genus of moths of the family Crambidae described by Julius Lederer in 1863. Members of the moth genus Palpita may be very similar.

== Species ==
- Stemorrhages amphitritalis (Guenée, 1854)
- Stemorrhages euthalassa (Meyrick, 1934)
- Stemorrhages exaula (Meyrick, 1888)
- Stemorrhages marthesiusalis (Walker, 1859)
- Stemorrhages oceanitis (Meyrick, 1886)
- Stemorrhages sericea (Drury, 1773)
- Stemorrhages thetydalis (Guenée, 1854)
- Stemorrhages titanicalis (Hampson, 1918)

== Former species ==
- Stemorrhages costata (Fabricius, 1794)
