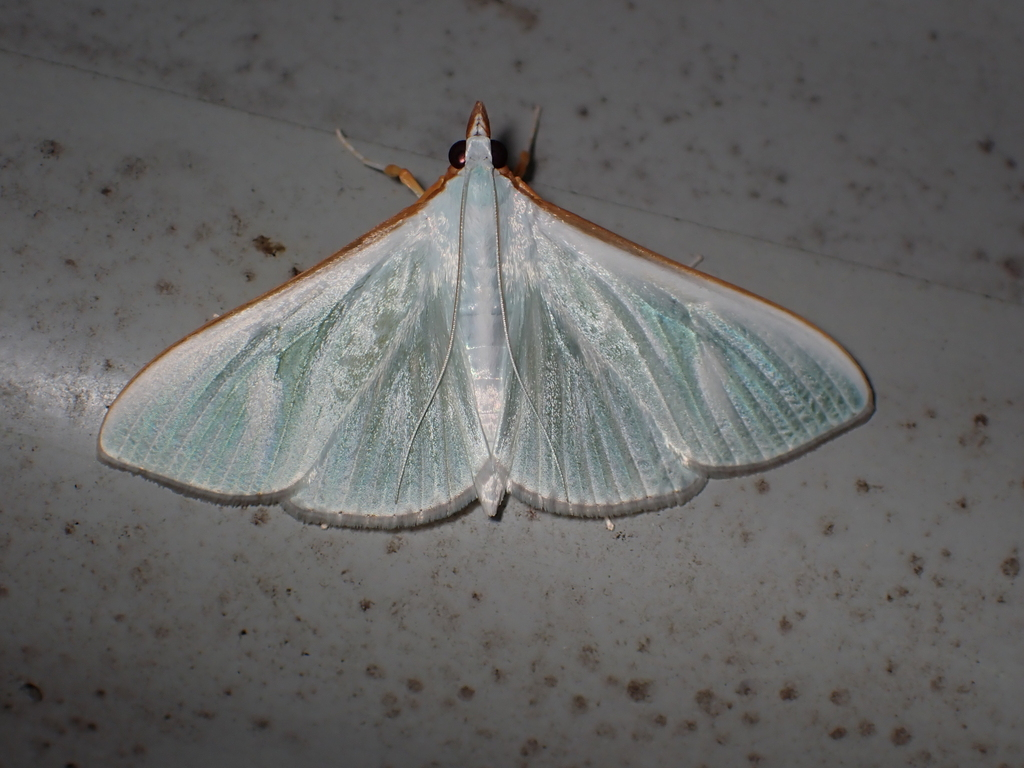

Scientific classification
- Kingdom: Animalia
- Phylum: Arthropoda
- Class: Insecta
- Order: Lepidoptera
- Family: Crambidae
- Genus: Stemorrhages
- Species: S. oceanitis

Binomial name
- Stemorrhages oceanitis (Meyrick, 1886)

Synonyms
- Margarodes oceanitis Meyrick, 1886

= Stemorrhages oceanitis =

Species of moth

Stemorrhages oceanitis is a moth in the family Crambidae. It was described by Edward Meyrick in 1886. It is found on Vanuatu, Fiji, and Sri Lanka.

The wingspan is 44–40 mm. The forewings are pale green, irregularly suffusedly irrorated (sprinkled) with white and with a narrow ferruginous costal streak, beneath margined by a suffused white streak. There is a row of dark grey dots on the hind margin and sometimes a grey hind-marginal line. The hindwings have the same colour and hind-marginal dots as the forewings.
