= Stemorrhages euthalassa =

Scientific classification
- Kingdom: Animalia
- Phylum: Arthropoda
- Class: Insecta
- Order: Lepidoptera
- Family: Crambidae
- Genus: Stemorrhages
- Species: S. euthalassa

Binomial name
- Stemorrhages euthalassa (Meyrick, 1934)

Synonyms
- Margaronia euthalassa Meyrick, 1934

Species of moth

Stemorrhages euthalassa is a moth in the family Crambidae. It was described by Edward Meyrick in 1934. It is found on the Marquesas Islands in French Polynesia.
