= Callipappus =

Scientific classification
- Kingdom: Animalia
- Phylum: Arthropoda
- Clade: Pancrustacea
- Class: Insecta
- Order: Hemiptera
- Suborder: Sternorrhyncha
- Superfamily: Coccoidea
- Family: Callipappidae
- Genus: Callipappus; Guérin-Méneville, 1841

Genus of true bugs

Callipappus is a genus of scale insects in the family Callipappidae in the order Hemiptera. There are five described species in the genus, all from Australia.

== Genera ==
Five species have been described:

- Callipappus australis (Maskell, 1890)
- Callipappus farinosus Fuller, 1897
- Callipappus immanis (Maskell, 1892)
- Callipappus rubiginosus (Maskell, 1893)
- Callipappus westwoodii Guérin-Méneville, 1841
