= Stemorrhages titanicalis =

Scientific classification
- Kingdom: Animalia
- Phylum: Arthropoda
- Class: Insecta
- Order: Lepidoptera
- Family: Crambidae
- Genus: Stemorrhages
- Species: S. titanicalis

Binomial name
- Stemorrhages titanicalis (Hampson, 1918)

Synonyms
- Margaronia titanicalis Hampson, 1918

Species of moth

Stemorrhages titanicalis is a moth in the family Crambidae. It was described by George Hampson in 1918. It is found on the Solomon Islands.

The wingspan is about 64 mm. The forewings are silvery white, tinged with very pale green. There is a fulvous costal fascia to the end of the cell and a terminal series of slight black points. The hindwings are white, tinged with very pale green. There is a slight dark terminal line to vein 2.
