= Stemorrhages amphitritalis =

Scientific classification
- Kingdom: Animalia
- Phylum: Arthropoda
- Class: Insecta
- Order: Lepidoptera
- Family: Crambidae
- Genus: Stemorrhages
- Species: S. amphitritalis

Binomial name
- Stemorrhages amphitritalis (Guenée, 1854)

Synonyms
- Margarodes amphitritalis Guenée, 1854; Margaronia amphitritalis Walker, 1866

Species of moth

Stemorrhages amphitritalis is a moth in the family Crambidae. It was described by Achille Guenée in 1854. It is found in Bangladesh, India, Myanmar and from Malaysia to the Solomon Islands. In Australia, it has been recorded from the Northern Territory and Queensland.
