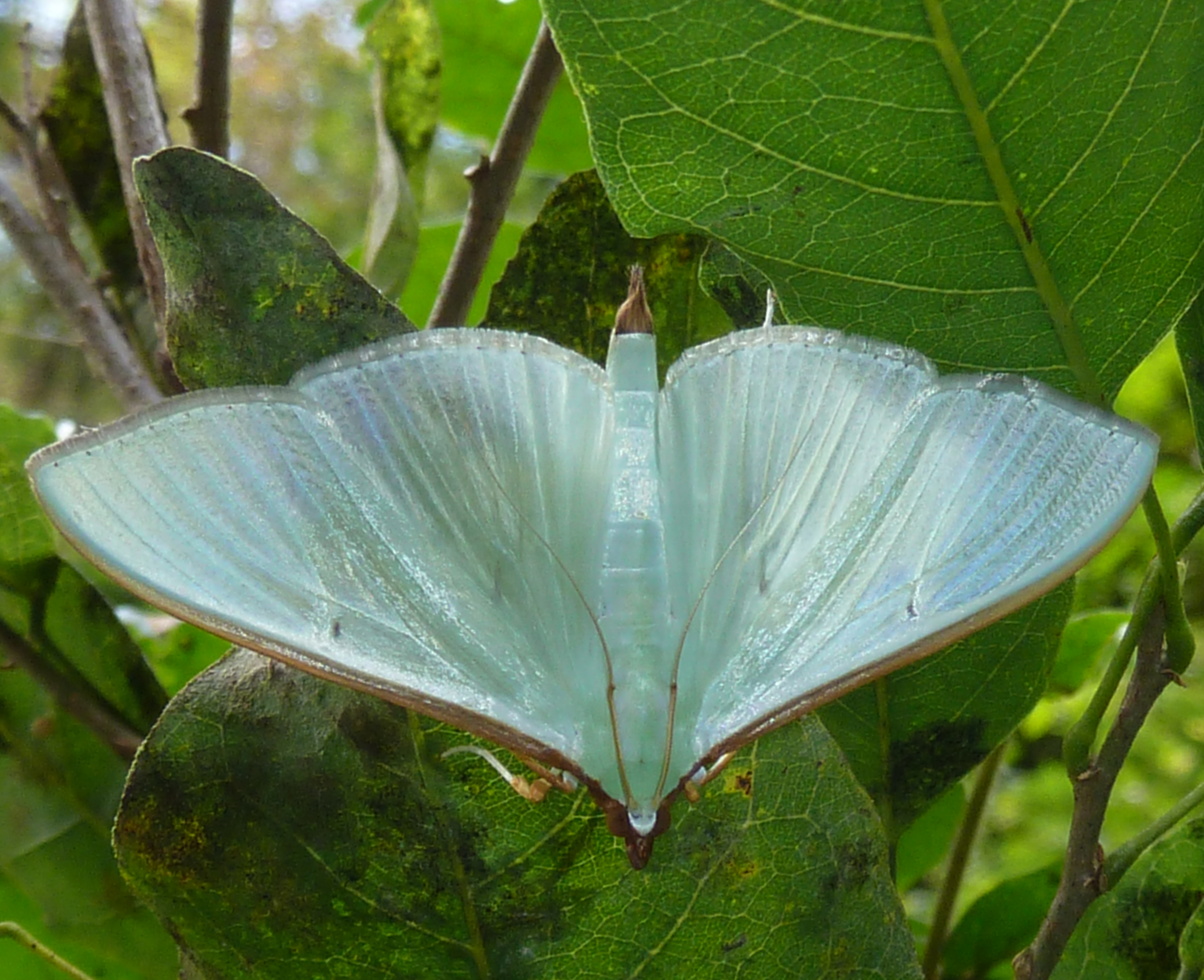
- Hiding on leaf underside

Scientific classification
- Kingdom: Animalia
- Phylum: Arthropoda
- Class: Insecta
- Order: Lepidoptera
- Family: Crambidae
- Genus: Stemorrhages
- Species: S. sericea

Binomial name
- Stemorrhages sericea (Drury, 1773)

Synonyms
- Phalaena (Pyralis) sericea Drury, 1773; Margarodes beryllalis Guenée, 1854; Margarodes beryttalis; Margaronia congradalis Hübner, 1825; Geometra laterata Fabricius, 1794; Phalaena Noctua polita Cramer, 1779; Margarodes sericeolalis Guenée, 1862; Botys thalassinalis Boisduval, 1833

= Stemorrhages sericea =

Large emerald pearl

Species of moth

Stemorrhages sericea, the large emerald pearl, is a moth of the subfamily of Spilomelinae within the family Crambidae. It lives throughout Africa south of the Sahara, and the Indian Ocean islands of Réunion, Madagascar, Mauritius and the Comoros.

Adults are pale turquoise with a brown stripe at the front edge of the wings. They have a brush of brown scent disseminating scales, called androconia, on the tail that can be everted for mate attraction.

The larvae feed on species of the Rubiaceae (including Gardenia jasminoides), the Apocynaceae (including Nerium oleander, Tabernanthe iboga, Tabernaemontana persicaefolia and Ervatamia coronaria), and besides on Raphia and Afrocarpus.
