= Gerald A. Kerkut =

British zoologist and physiologist

- Born: 19 August 1927
- Died: 6 March 2004
- Occupation: Zoologist

Gerald Allan Kerkut (or G. A. Kerkut) (19 August 1927 – 6 March 2004) was a British zoologist and physiologist.

== Career ==
He attended the University of Cambridge from 1945 to 1952 and earned a doctorate in zoology. He went on to establish the Department of Physiology and Biochemistry at University of Southampton where he remained throughout his career. He became Professor of Physiology and Biochemistry in 1966 and went on to become the Dean of Science, Chairman of the School of Biochemical and Physiological Sciences and Head of the Department of Neurophysiology.

== Controversy ==
Kerkut's book The Implications of Evolution pointed out some existing unsolved problems and points of concern for evolutionary studies. He referred to seven evolutionary assumptions which he felt lacked sufficient evidentiary support. Kerkut concludes his 1960 book with the statement "It is not clear whether the changes that bring about speciation are of the same nature as those that brought about the development of new phyla. The answer will be found by future experimental work and not by dogmatic assertions that the General Theory of Evolution must be correct because there is nothing else that will satisfactorily take its place.". Biologist Theodosius Dobzhansky took issue with Kerkut's statements about evolution where he comments “The basic conclusion of the author is, however, something else - since we cannot yet reconstruct in all of the details the phylogeny of the animal kingdom, therefore, evolution is not “proven”! This is a confusion of two distinct problems; we may be sure that life (or, for that matter, the Cosmos) had a history, but it does not follow that we know all the events of which these histories are composed, with their respective dates. The author has been wise not to suggest any alternatives to the theory of evolution...”. The book has also been criticized for inadequately describing the fossil evidence for evolution.

Botanist Elwood B. Ehrle in a review has noted:

[Kerkut] apparently makes the mistake of assuming that the case for evolution rests on the documentation of a monophyletic development of the animal kingdom-indeed, of all life. Even if it should be conceded that polyphylesis is the rule rather than the exception, the fact of evolution remains in crystalline clarity.

Creationists have taken Kerkut's points as evidence against evolution and interpreted them to support their own claims. In his book, Kerkut distinguished between the Special Theory of Evolution (often referred to as microevolution) and what he termed the General Theory of Evolution (often referred to as macroevolution, but also including abiogenesis).

== Publications ==
=== Books ===
- Kerkut GA, ed. (1958) The Invertebrata, Cambridge University Press, Cambridge, UK.
- Kerkut GA (1960). The Implications of Evolution, Pergamon Press, Oxford, UK.
- Kerkut GA (1969). The Missing Pieces, University of Southampton, Southampton, UK.
- Kerkut, G. A. and L. I. Gilbert, eds. (1985) Comprehensive Insect Physiology, Biochemistry & Pharmacology : 13-Volume Set, 8536 pages, Pergamon Press, ISBN 0-08-026850-1
- Kerkut GA (1985). Microcomputers; the revolution of our time. In Microcomputers in the Neurosciences, ed. Kerkut GA, pp 1–8. Oxford University Press, Oxford, UK.
- Kerkut, G. A. (1987) Progress in Neurobiology, in four parts, Pergamon Press, ISBN 0-08-031508-9 (part 1)

=== Editor of Journals ===
- Comparative Biochemistry and Physiology, started in 1960
- Progress in Neurobiology, 1973
