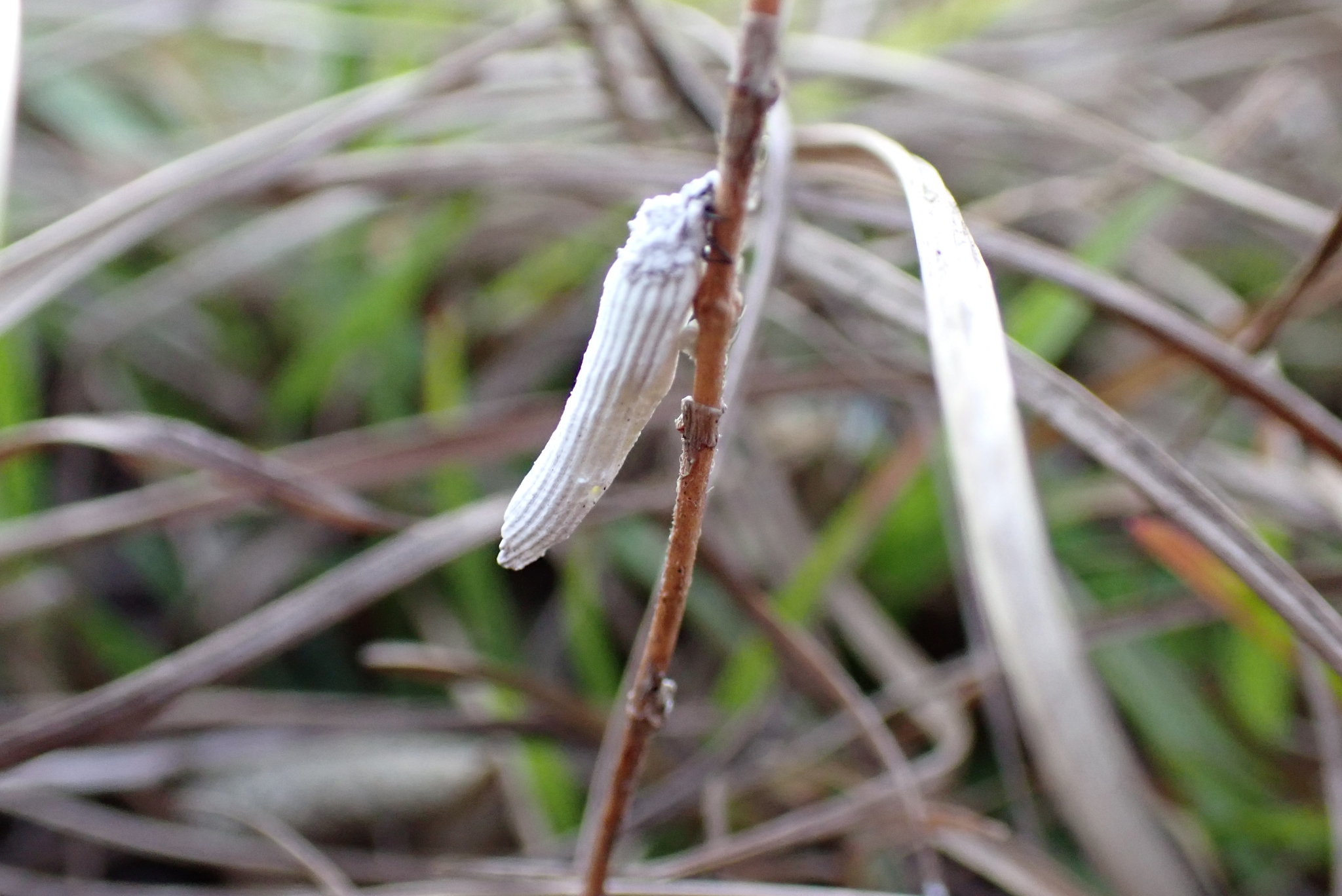
- Genista giant scale insect (Crypticerya genistae)

Scientific classification
- Domain: Eukaryota
- Kingdom: Animalia
- Phylum: Arthropoda
- Class: Insecta
- Order: Hemiptera
- Suborder: Sternorrhyncha
- Family: Monophlebidae
- Genus: Crypticerya; Cockerell, 1895

= Crypticerya =

Genus of insects

Crypticerya is a genus of scale insects belonging to the family Monophlebidae. When the genus was revived in 2008, it included 22 species, all found in the Americas. As of 2024, there are 28 described species.

== History ==
The name was established by Cockerell in 1895 as a subgenus of Icerya. It was elevated to a genus in 1899, synonymized in 1926, and revived as a genus in 2008.

== List of species ==
- Crypticerya abrahami (Newstead, 1917)
- Crypticerya aegyptiensis (Foldi, 2010)
- Crypticerya brasiliensis (Hempel, 1900)
- Crypticerya bursera (Unruh, 2008)
- Crypticerya colimensis (Cockerell, 1902)
- Crypticerya flava (Hempel, 1920)
- Crypticerya flocculosa (Hempel, 1932)
- Crypticerya genistae (Hempel, 1912)
- Crypticerya littoralis (Cockerell, 1898)
- Crypticerya luederwaldti (Hempel, 1918)
- Crypticerya marocensis (Foldi, 2010)
- Crypticerya mexicana (Cockerell & Parrott in Cockerell, 1899)
- Crypticerya minima (Morrison, 1919)
- Crypticerya montserratensis (Riley & Howard, 1890)
- Crypticerya morrilli (Cockerell, 1914)
- Crypticerya multicicatrices (Kondo & Unruh, 2009)
- Crypticerya ovivivipara (Gavrilov-Zimin, 2018)
- Crypticerya palmeri (Riley & Howard, 1890)
- Crypticerya pimentae (Newstead, 1917)
- Crypticerya rileyi (Cockerell, 1895)
- Crypticerya rosae (Riley & Howard, 1890)
- Crypticerya similis (Morrison, 1927)
- Crypticerya subandina (Leonardi, 1911)
- Crypticerya tabernicola (Ferris, 1921)
- Crypticerya thibaudi (Foldi, 2010)
- Crypticerya townsendi (Cockerell, 1896)
- Crypticerya tuberculata (Morrison, 1941)
- Crypticerya zeteki (Cockerell, 1914)
