= Desmococcus (insect) =

Scientific classification
- Kingdom: Animalia
- Phylum: Arthropoda
- Clade: Pancrustacea
- Class: Insecta
- Order: Hemiptera
- Suborder: Sternorrhyncha
- Family: Margarodidae
- Genus: Desmococcus; McKenzie, 1942

Species
- Desmococcus captivus Desmococcus sedentarius

Genus of true bugs

Desmococcus is a genus of scale insects in the family Margarodidae, comprising two species from the western United States, feeding on pines. The type species is Desmococcus captivus
