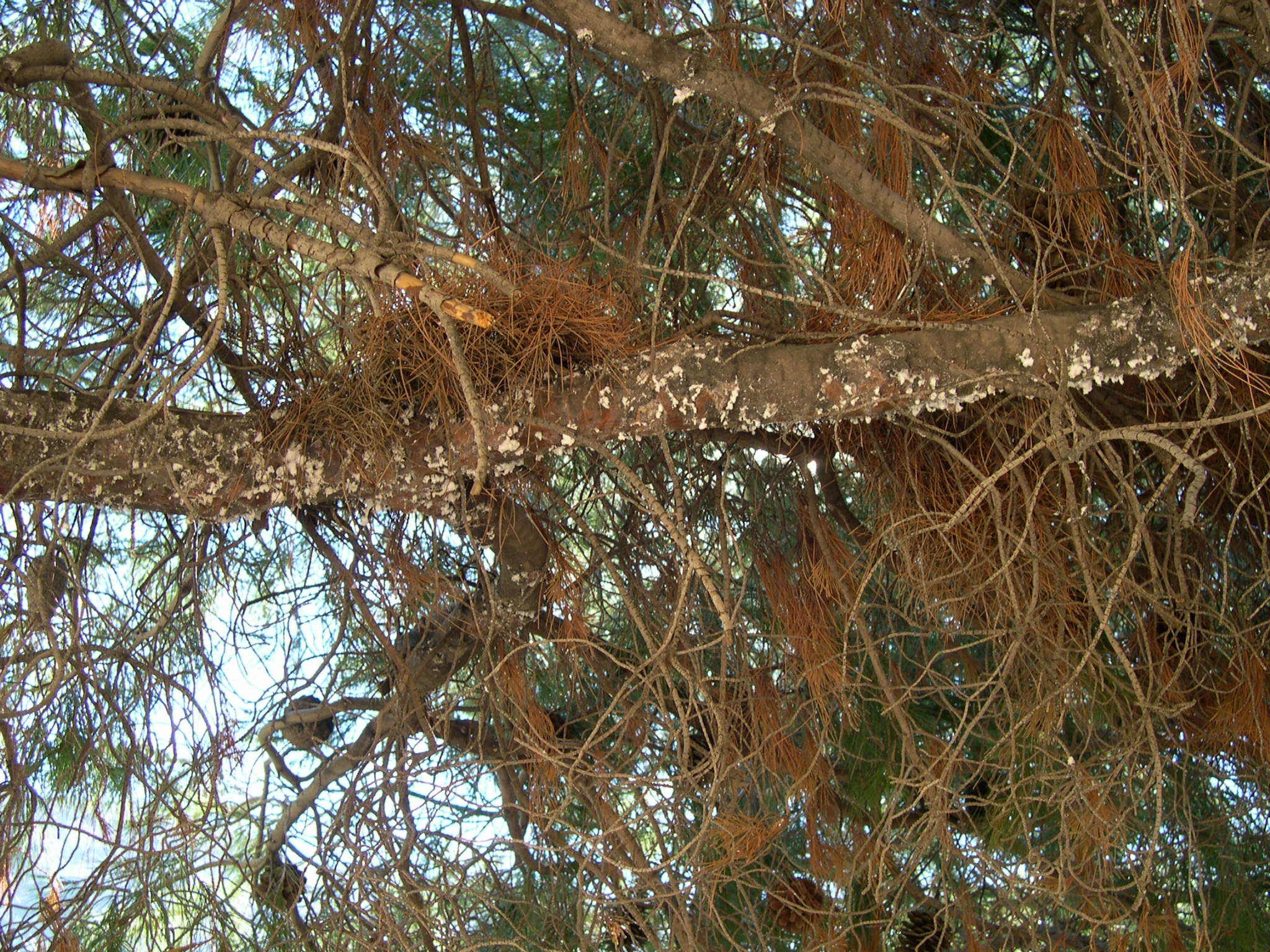
- Pine branch with Marchalina hellenica secretions (honeydew)

Scientific classification
- Kingdom: Animalia
- Phylum: Arthropoda
- Class: Insecta
- Order: Hemiptera
- Suborder: Sternorrhyncha
- Family: Margarodidae
- Genus: Marchalina
- Species: M. hellenica

Binomial name
- Marchalina hellenica (Gennadius, 1883)

Synonyms
- Monophlebus hellenicus; Marchalina caucasica

= Marchalina hellenica =

Species of true bug

Marchalina hellenica is a scale insect that lives in the eastern Mediterranean region, mainly in Greece and Turkey. It is an invasive species in Melbourne, Australia. It lives by sucking the sap of pine trees, mainly the Turkish pine (Pinus brutia) and, to smaller extent, Aleppo pine (Pinus halepensis), Scots pine (Pinus sylvestris) and stone pine (Pinus pinea). It can be found in the cracks and under the scales of the bark of these trees, hidden under the white cotton-like wax it secretes. Its main form of reproduction is parthenogenesis.

The honeydew it produces is an important source of food for forest honey bees, which produce pine honey. In Greece and Turkey, about 60% of the honey production is derived from it.

It is the sole member of the genus Marchalina, though some authors argue that M. caucasica which is currently considered a synonym of M. hellenica may be a distinct species.
