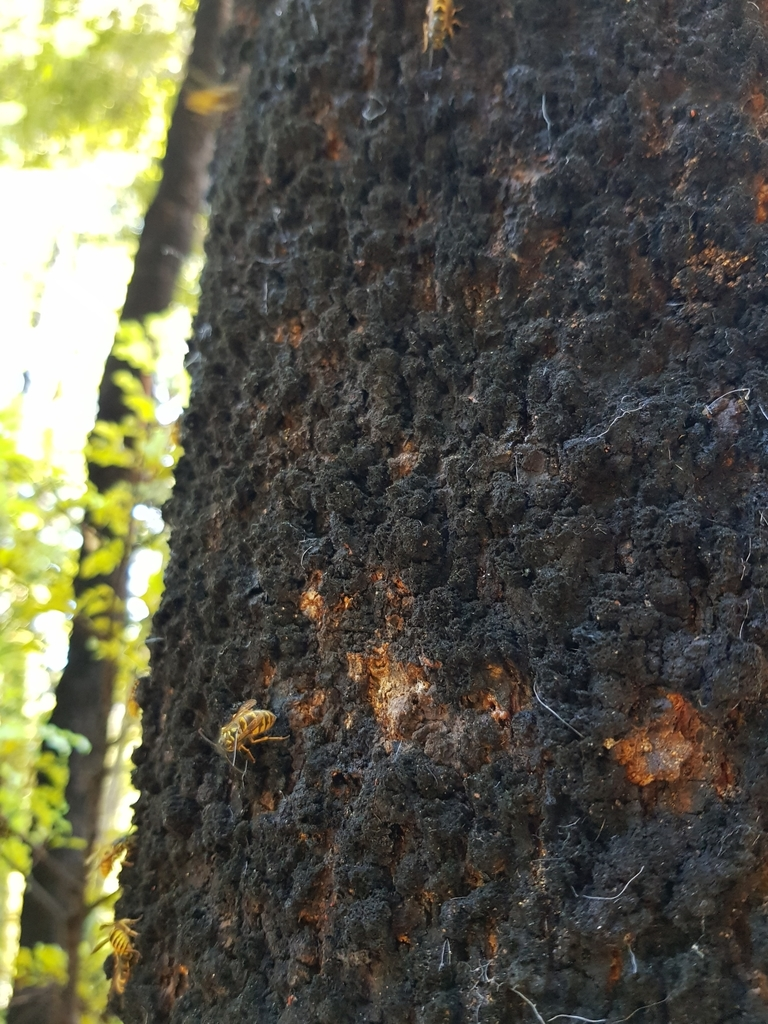

Scientific classification
- Kingdom: Animalia
- Phylum: Arthropoda
- Clade: Pancrustacea
- Class: Insecta
- Order: Hemiptera
- Suborder: Sternorrhyncha
- Family: Margarodidae
- Genus: Ultracoelostoma
- Species: U. assimile

Binomial name
- Ultracoelostoma assimile (Maskell, 1890)

= Ultracoelostoma assimile =

Species of true bug

Ultracoelostoma assimile, commonly known as sooty beech scale, is a scale insect in the Margarodidae family. It is endemic to New Zealand. It was first described by William Miles Maskell in 1890.
