= Stemorrhages exaula =

Scientific classification
- Kingdom: Animalia
- Phylum: Arthropoda
- Class: Insecta
- Order: Lepidoptera
- Family: Crambidae
- Genus: Stemorrhages
- Species: S. exaula

Binomial name
- Stemorrhages exaula (Meyrick, 1888)

Synonyms
- Margarodes exaula Meyrick, 1888

Species of moth

Stemorrhages exaula is a moth of the family Crambidae. It is endemic to the Hawaiian islands of Kauai, Oahu, Molokai, Maui and Hawaii.

Adults are pale green.

The larvae feed on Ochrosia sandwicensis and Rauvolfia sandwicensis.
