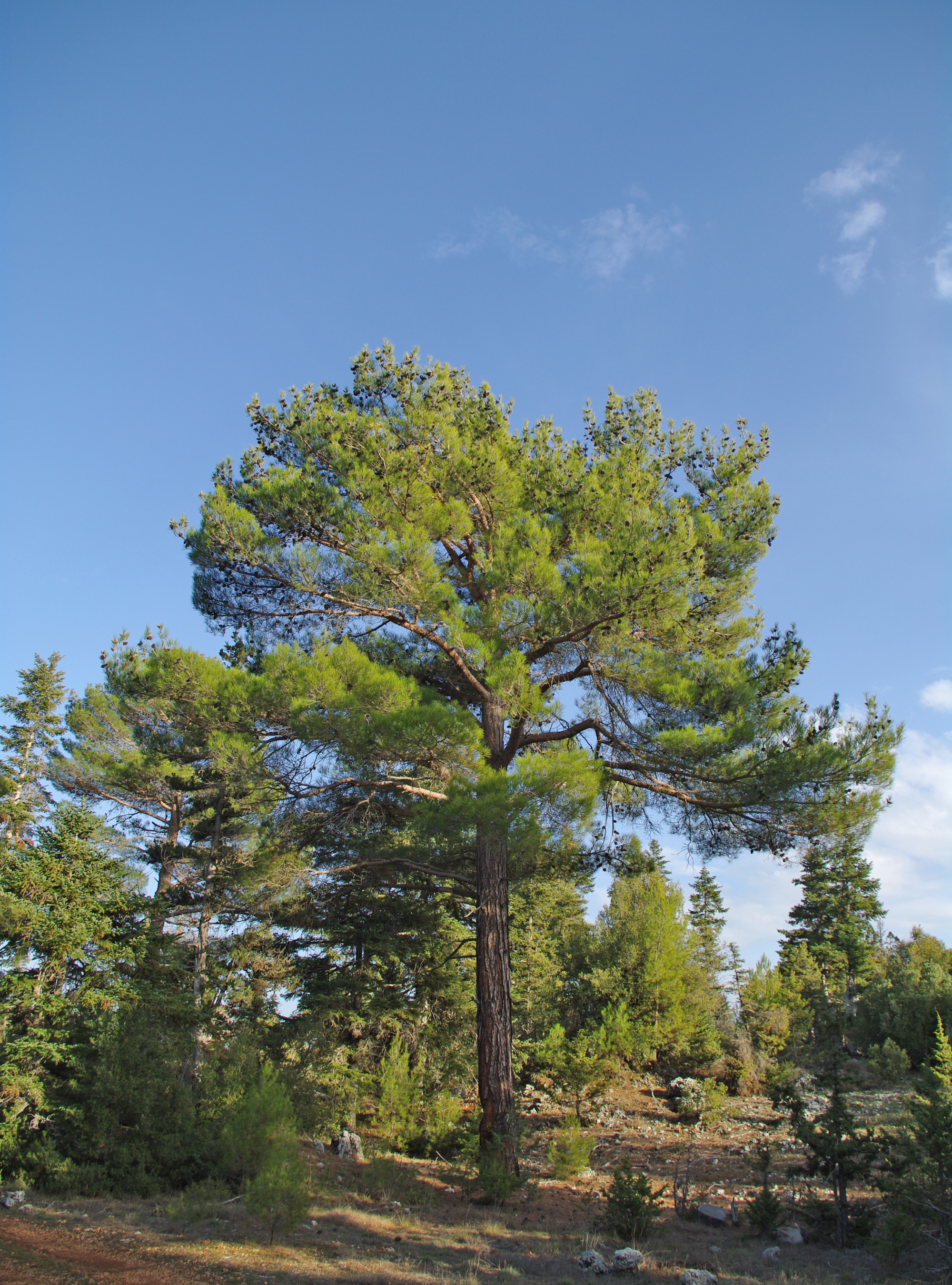
- Turkish pine near Mersin, Turkey

Conservation status
- Least Concern (IUCN 3.1)

Scientific classification
- Kingdom: Plantae
- Clade: Tracheophytes
- Clade: Gymnosperms
- Division: Pinophyta
- Class: Pinopsida
- Order: Pinales
- Family: Pinaceae
- Genus: Pinus
- Subgenus: P. subg. Pinus
- Section: P. sect. Pinus
- Subsection: Pinus subsect. Pinaster
- Species: P. brutia

Binomial name
- Pinus brutia Ten.
- Distribution

= Pinus brutia =

Species of conifer

Pinus brutia, the Turkish pine or Calabrian pine, is a species of conifer in the family Pinaceae, a pine native to the eastern Mediterranean region. The bulk of its range is in Turkey, with smaller populations occurring in Bulgaria, Crete, Cyprus, Iraq, western Syria, Northern Iran, Crimea, the western Caucasus, and Azerbaijan; it is also naturalised as far east as Afghanistan and Pakistan. It is also known as East Mediterranean pine, Afghan pine, and Brutia pine. The name "Calabrian pine" comes from an introduced grove in the region of Calabria in southern Italy; historically this region was called Bruttium, which is likely where the specific epithet "brutia" comes from. Pinus brutia bears many similarities with other, closely related species such as Pinus halepensis and Pinus canariensis. Turkish pine forms a species complex with the former.

== Description ==
Pinus brutia is a medium-sized tree, reaching 20–35 metres (66–115 feet) tall with a trunk diameter of up to 1 m (3 1/2 ft), exceptionally 2 m (6 1/2 ft). The young bark is thin and red-orange, maturing to grey-brown to orange, fissured to flaky in texture. The leaves are needle-like, slender, 10–18 centimetres (4–7 inches) long, dark green to yellow-green. The needles are in fascicles of two, or rarely three.

The male cones are squat, 15–20 mm (0.59–0.79 in) long. The female cones are short, with rigid, woody scales, 5–10 cm (2.0–3.9 in) long, 5–7 cm (2.0–2.8 in) broad, maturing from green to red-orange; occasional specimens show similarities in cone structure to the related Pinus canariensis. They most often appear in whorls of 3 to 4, and mature in two years after pollination. The seeds are usually wind dispersed, dropping from the cones after they open, but some trees have been observed with cones that do not open enough to facilitate wind dispersal. The Krüper's nuthatch may assist these trees in dispersal.

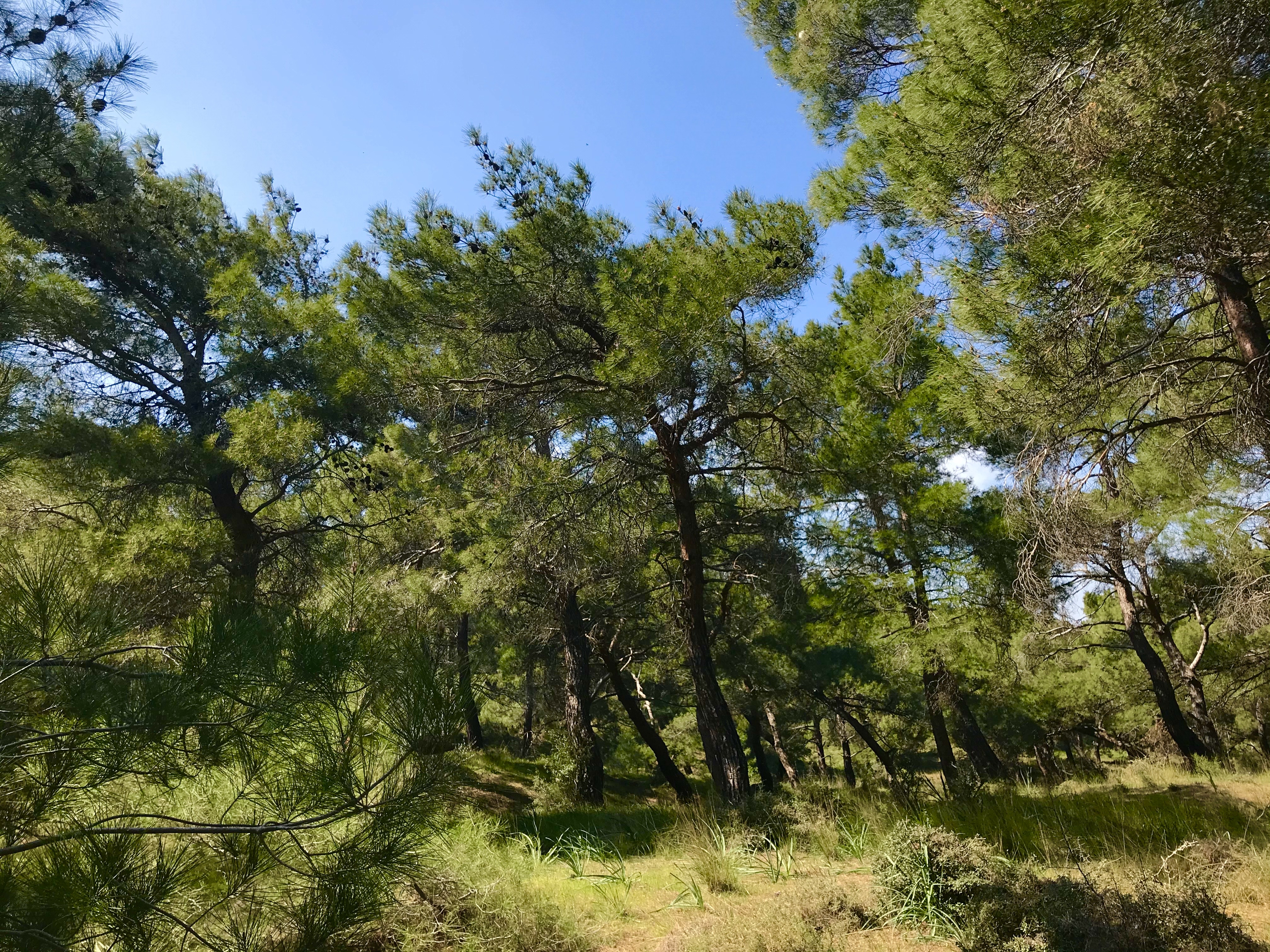
Forest in Yamanlardağı Nature Park, Karşıyaka, İzmir, Turkey

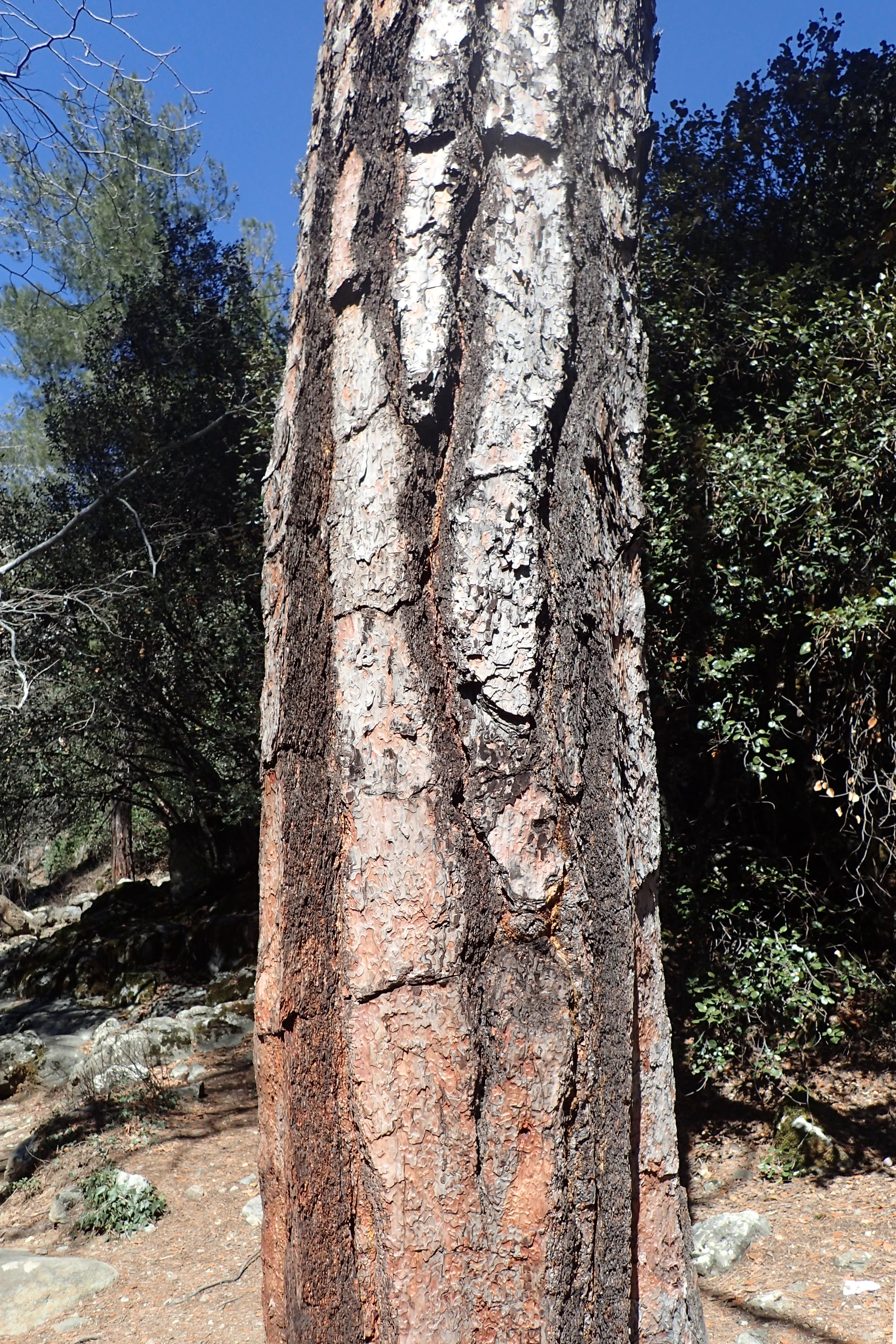
Mature bark showing red-brown fissures

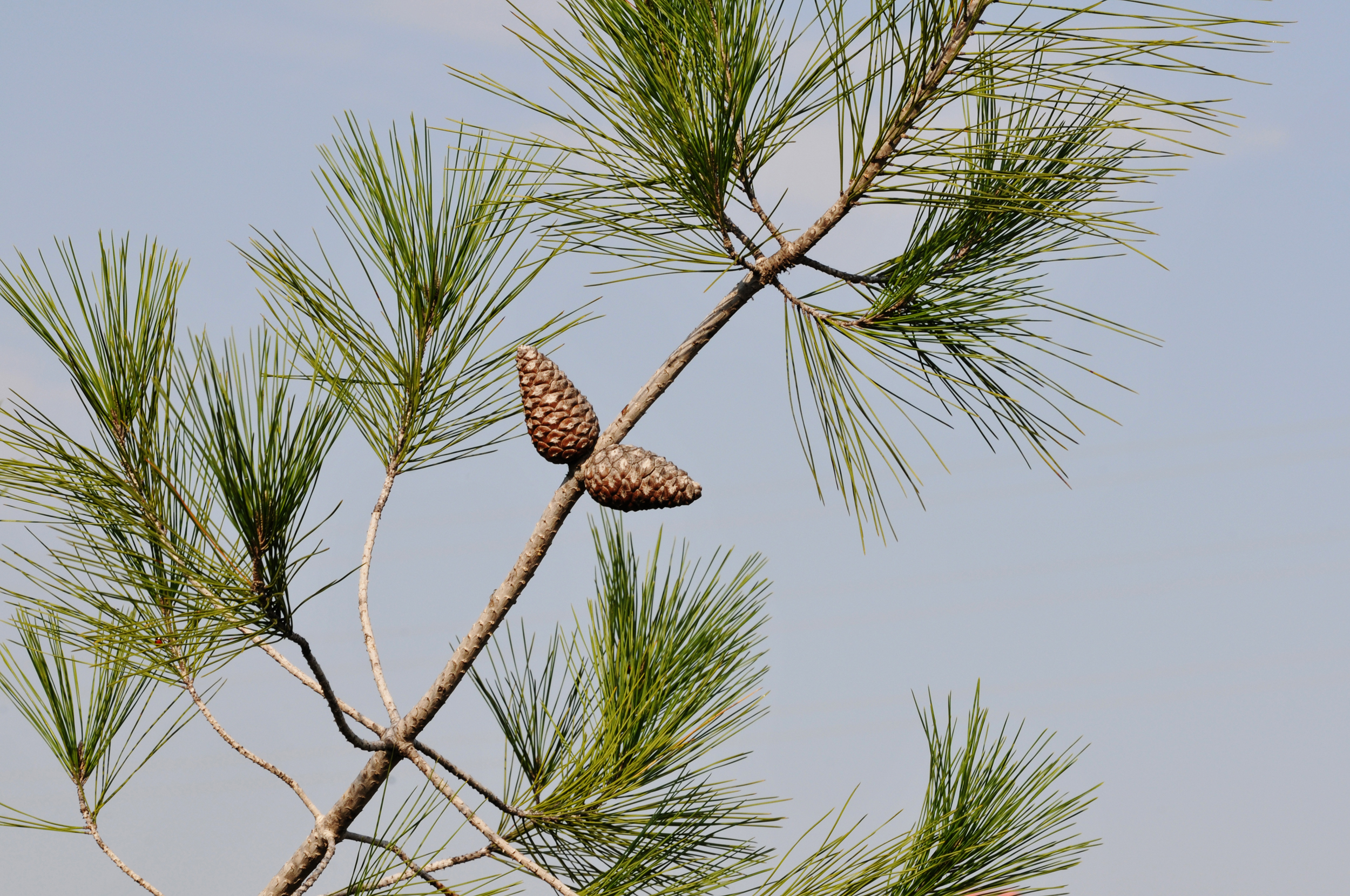
Closed cones and foliage, Adana, Turkey

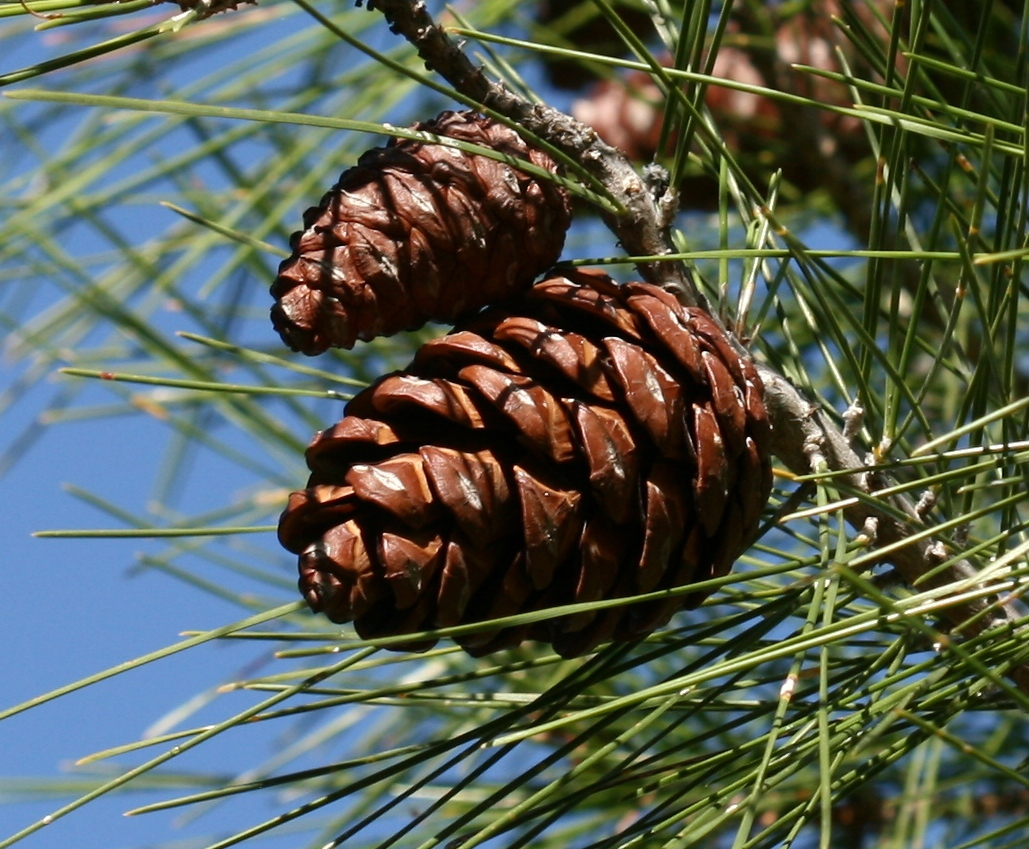
Open cones, Argaka, Cyprus

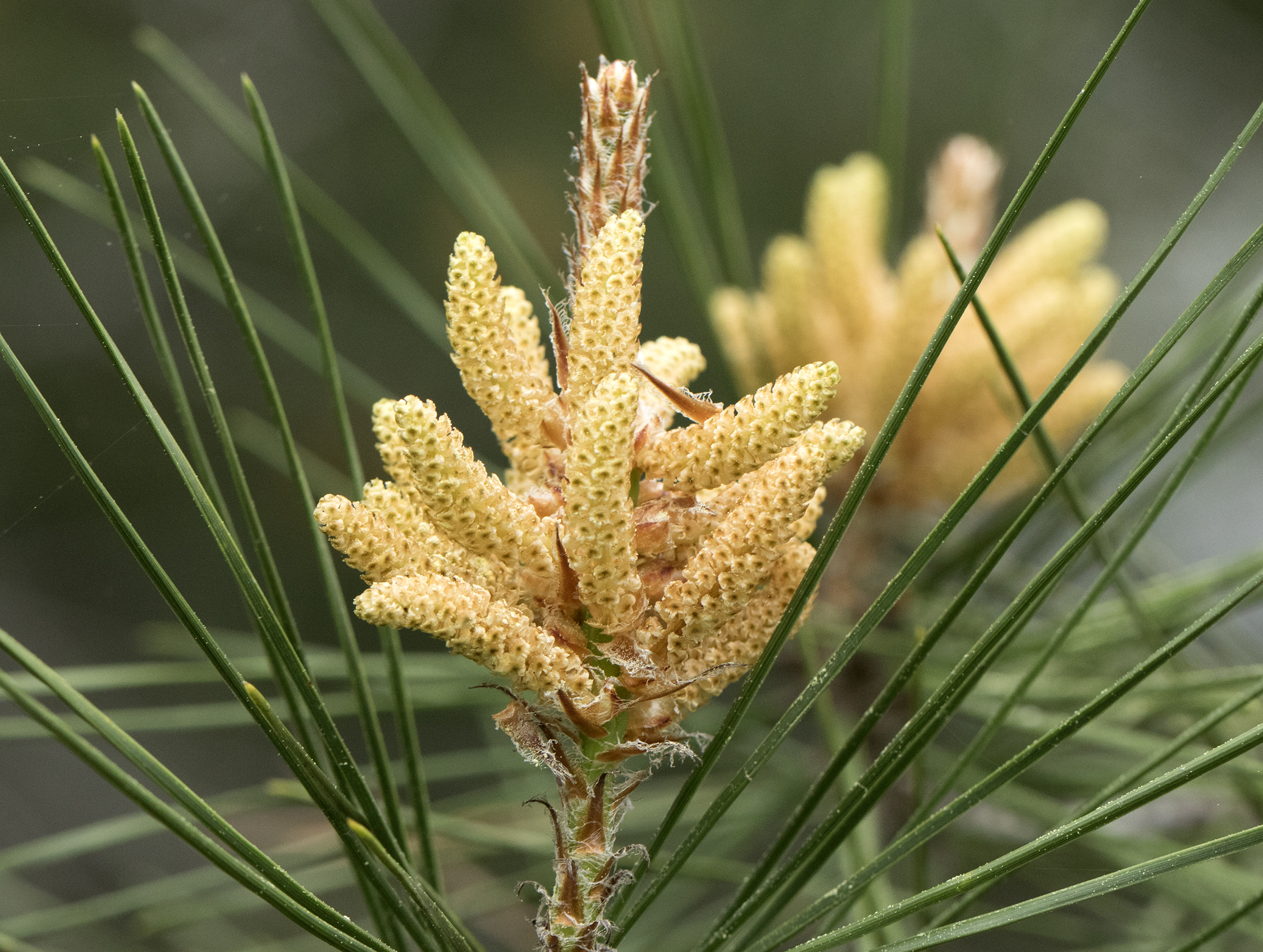
Male (pollen) cones

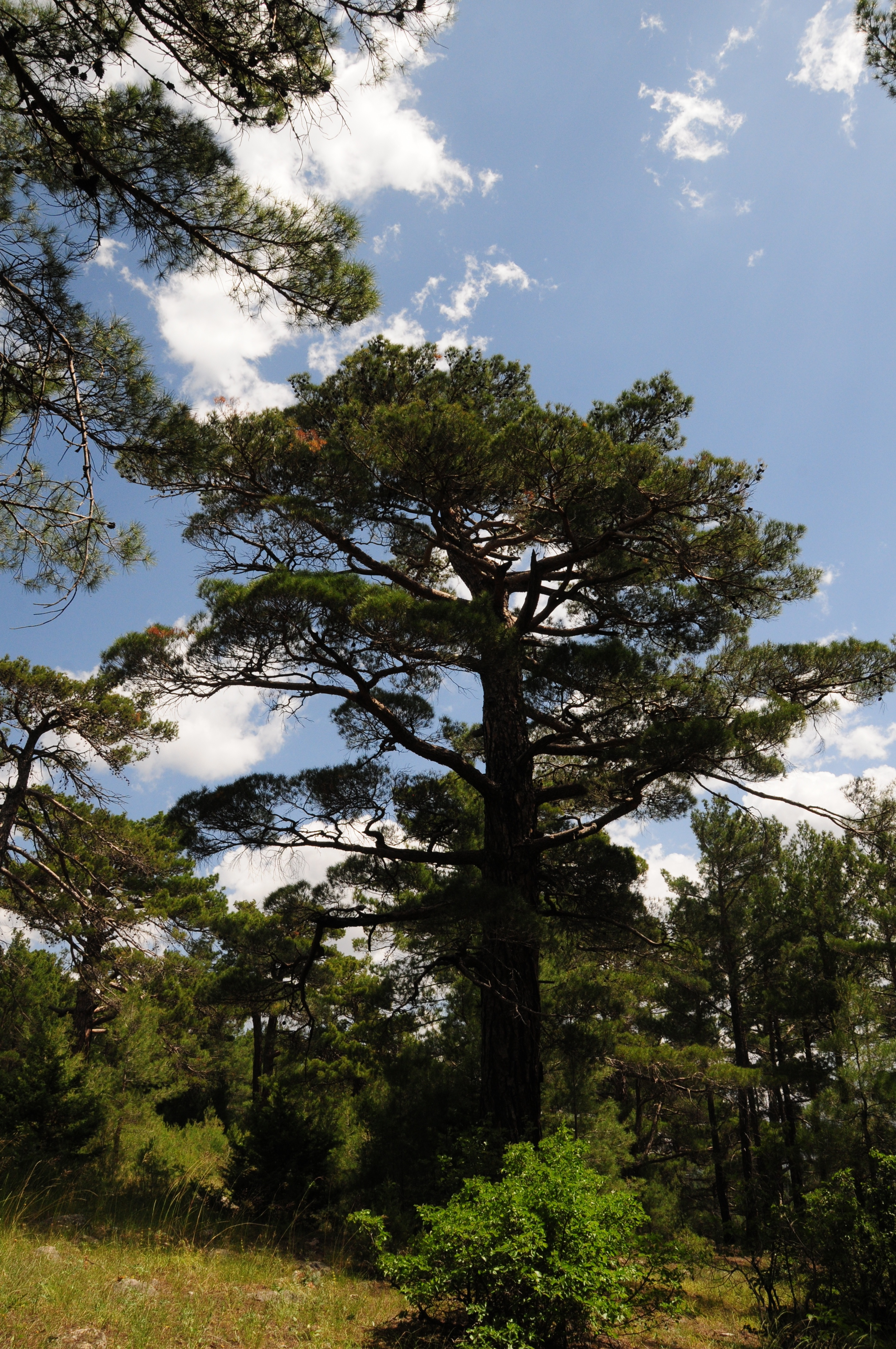
An old specimen from Adana Province, Turkey

== Taxonomy ==
The Italian botanist Michele Tenore described the species in 1811. While Tenore did not provide an explanation for the specific epithet, it was likely named after the historical region of Brut(t)ium, now Calabria, where an introduced population has become naturalised.

Pinus brutia is closely related to Pinus halepensis, and female P. brutia cones have been shown to accept and hybridise with P. halepensis pollen. In the past it has been considered a variety or subspecies of P. halepensis. The species is now treated as distinct, and forms a species complex across the Mediterranean with P. halepensis.

=== Varieties ===
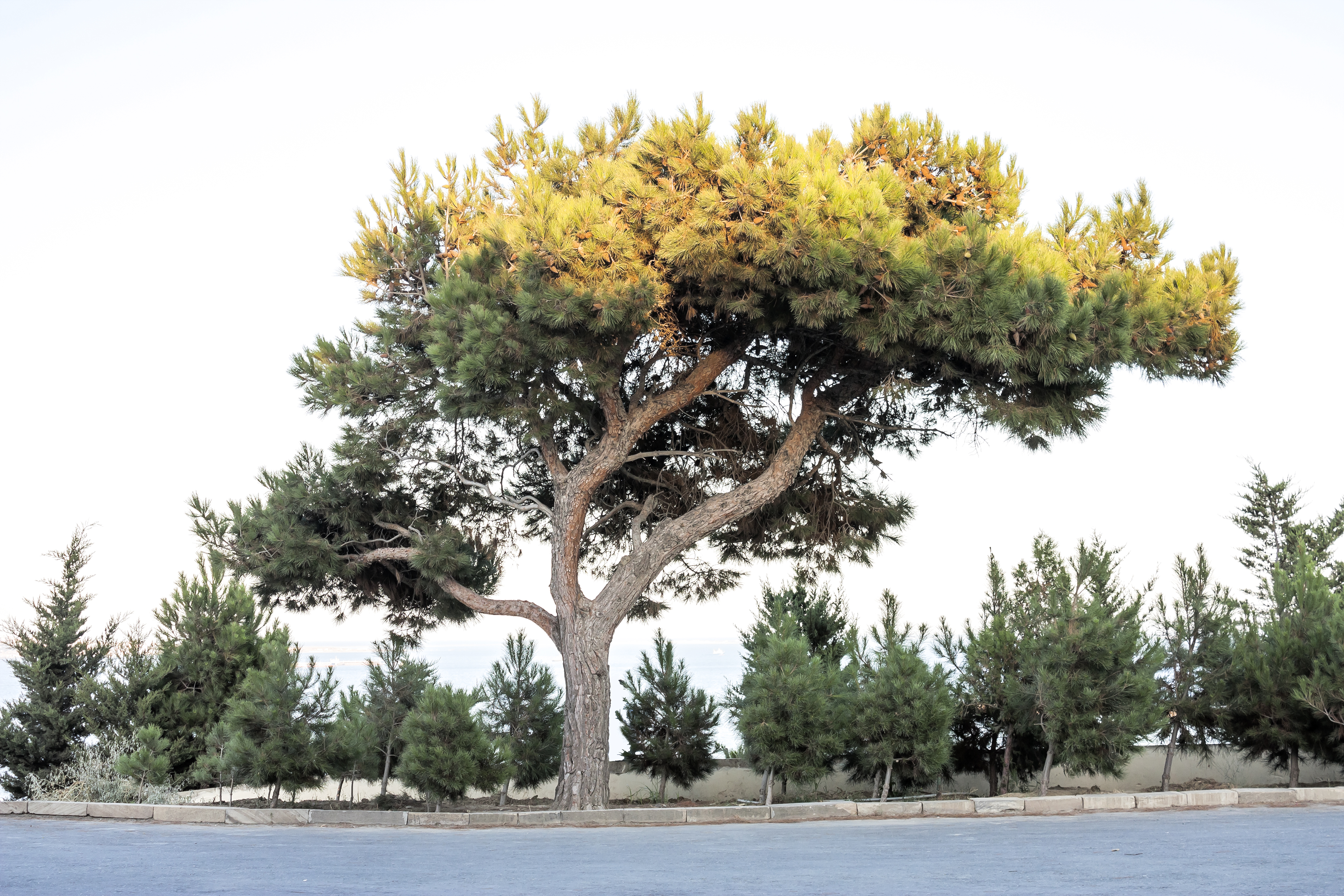
P. brutia var. eldarica specimen cultivated in Baku, Azerbaijan.

- Pinus brutia var. brutia: Typical form, with needles 10–18 cm (3.9–7.1 in) long. Found across the Eastern Mediterranean.
- Pinus brutia var. pityusa: Found in smaller stands along the eastern Black Sea coast, near Pitsunda, and on the south coast of Crimea. Very similar to var. brutia.
- Pinus brutia var. pendulifolia: Muğla, Turkey. Exceptionally long needles, to 24–29 cm (9.4–11.4 in), that are pendulous similar to P. canariensis.
- Pinus brutia var. eldarica, Afghan Pine: native to Azerbaijan, Georgia, Armenia, Iraq, Iran, and naturalised in Afghanistan and Pakistan. Smaller cones, 5–8 cm (2.0–3.1 in). Often treated as a subspecies of P. brutia, or a species of its own. Due to its tolerance of drought and poor soil, it is widely planted as an ornamental tree in southern Europe, Australia, South Africa, and the southwestern United States.

== Distribution and habitat ==
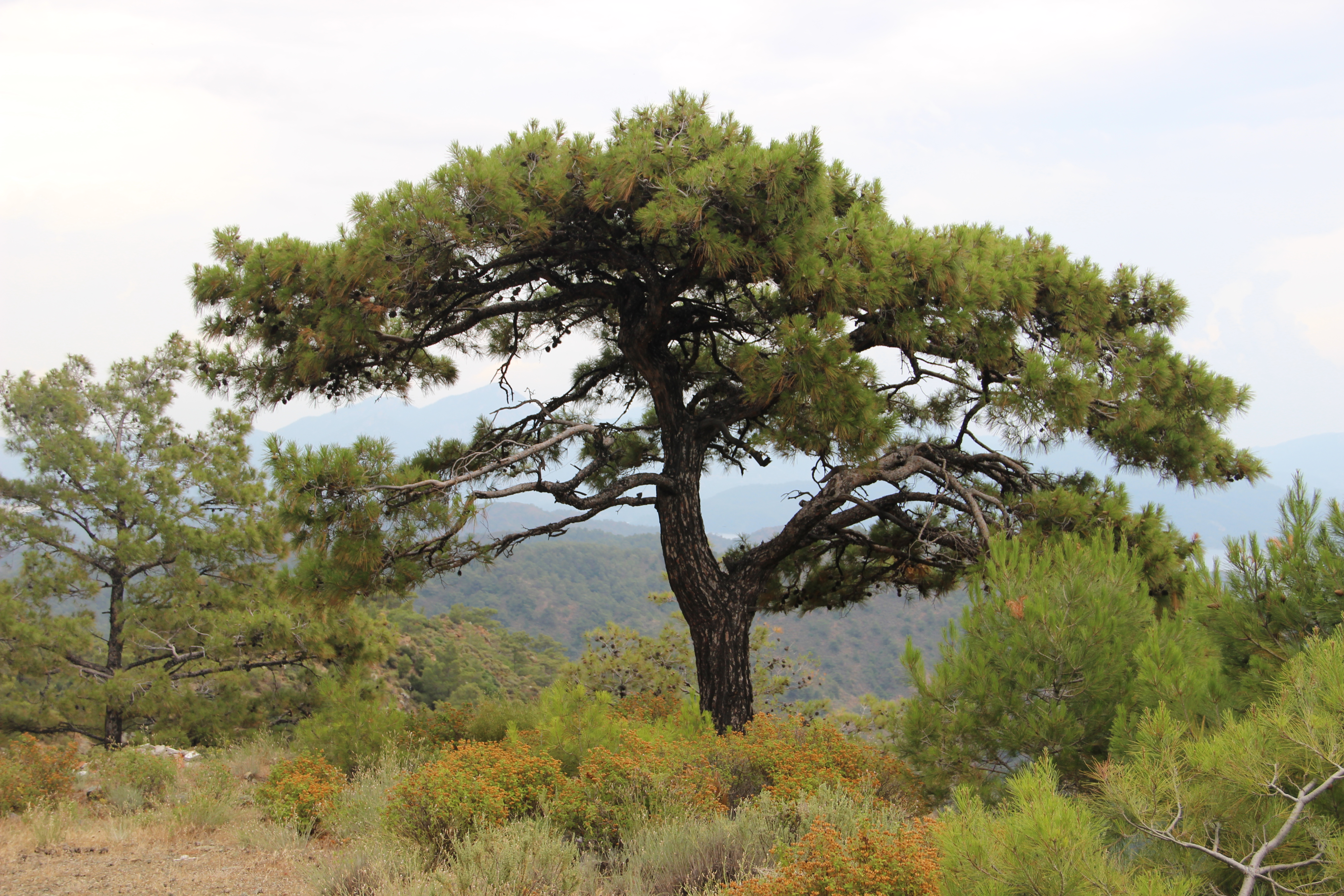
Old Pinus brutia near Datça, Turkey

The bulk of its range is in Turkey, but it also extends to southeasternmost Bulgaria, the East Aegean Islands of Aegean Sea, Crete, Crimea, Iran, Georgia, Azerbaijan, northern Iraq, western Syria, Lebanon and Cyprus. Its presence in the eastern Mediterranean is hypothesised to date only from the nineteenth century, and is predominantly due to human activity. It is not native to Israel, but was introduced there in the 1930s. It generally occurs at low altitudes, mostly from sea level to 500 m (1,600 ft) in northern Turkey, up to 1,200 m (3,900 ft) in the south of its range.

== Ecology ==
Pinus brutia is a diagnostic species of the vegetation class Pinetea halepensis.

The Krüper's nuthatch, a rare nuthatch, is largely restricted to forests of Turkish pine and depends heavily on it for feeding; the ranges of the two species are largely coincident.

P. brutia is resistant to the Israeli pine bast scale insect Matsucoccus josephi and is a major host for Thaumetopoea caterpillars.

The species covers 175,000 hectares (430,000 acres) in Cyprus, roughly ~90% of all woodland coverage on the island. It forms ectomycorrhizal associations with numerous species of fungi, and its logs and branches are excellent substrates for many kinds of decomposing organisms.

== Uses ==
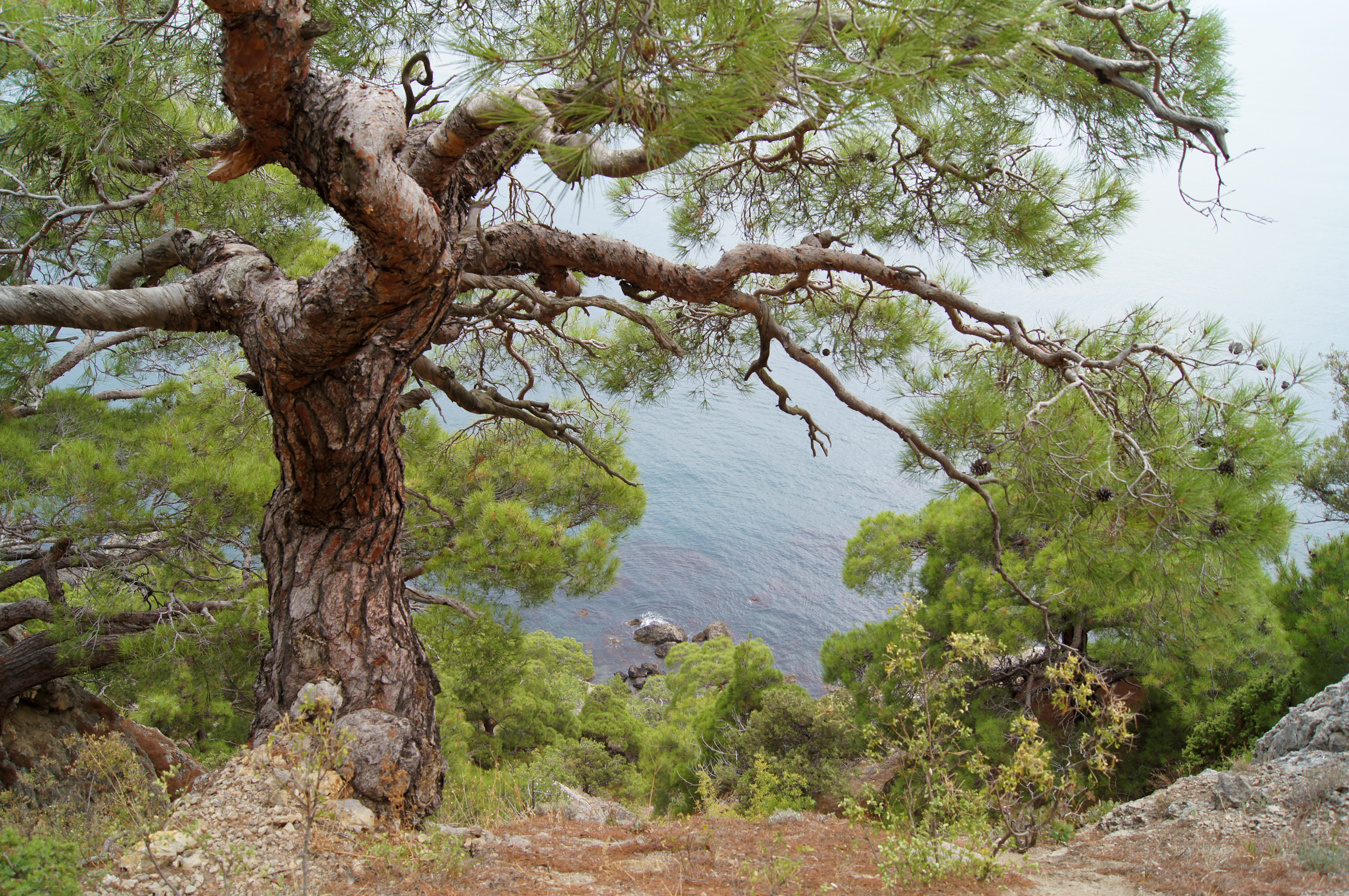
Pinus brutia in Crimea, Ukraine

=== Honey ===
Turkish pine is a host plant to a sap-sucking aphid Marchalina hellenica. Under normal circumstances, this insect does no significant damage to the pine but is of great importance for the excess sugar it secretes. This sugar, "honeydew", is collected by honeybees which make it into the valuable "pine honey" (Turkish, çam balı).

=== Landmark ===
The "Lone Pine", a prominent landmark tree at an ANZAC First World War battle at Gallipoli, was this species. Cones from the battlefield were taken home to Australia, and plants sourced from the seeds were planted as living memorials.

"Lone Pine" memorials, based on cones brought back from Gallipoli, may use this species or Aleppo pine. Some memorials utilise other species altogether.

=== Forestry ===
It is widely planted for timber, both in its native area (it is the most important tree in forestry in Turkey and Cyprus) and elsewhere in the Mediterranean region east to Pakistan. The timber is used for many purposes including carpentry, industry, general constructions, firewood and pulp. In Israel it is sometimes preferred to the more widely-used Pinus halepensis (Aleppo pine) because of its resistance to Matsucoccus josephi. It is also known for being well suited to recreational sites.

=== Cultivation ===
Pinus brutia is a popular ornamental tree, extensively planted in parks and gardens in hot dry areas (such as southern California, Utah, New Mexico and Nevada, as well as throughout Arizona and central Texas in the United States), where its considerable heat and drought tolerance is highly valued. The subspecies eldarica is the most drought tolerant form, used in Afghanistan, Iran and more recently in the Southwestern United States. In this region, P. brutia subsp. eldarica is referred to as "Eldarica pine", "Afghan pine" or "Mondell pine" (after Mondell Bennett, a commercial tree grower in New Mexico who popularised the species starting in 1969).
