= Callipappidae =

Scientific classification
- Domain: Eukaryota
- Kingdom: Animalia
- Phylum: Arthropoda
- Class: Insecta
- Order: Hemiptera
- Suborder: Sternorrhyncha
- Infraorder: Coccomorpha
- Superfamily: Coccoidea
- Family: Callipappidae

Family of true bugs

Callipappidae is a family of scales and mealybugs in the order Hemiptera. There are at least two genera and about nine described species in Callipappidae.

== Genera ==
These two genera belong to the family Callipappidae:

- Callipappus Guérin-Méneville, 1841
- Platycoelostoma Morrison, 1923
