= Xylococcus (insect) =

Scientific classification
- Domain: Eukaryota
- Kingdom: Animalia
- Phylum: Arthropoda
- Class: Insecta
- Order: Hemiptera
- Suborder: Sternorrhyncha
- Family: Xylococcidae
- Genus: Xylococcus; Lôw, 1882

Genus of true bugs

Xylococcus is a genus of scales and mealybugs in the family Xylococcidae. There are about six described species in Xylococcus.

== Species ==
These six species belong to the genus Xylococcus:

- Xylococcus castanopsis Dong, 2017 (China)
- Xylococcus filiferus Löw, 1882
- Xylococcus japonicus Oguma, 1926 (Japan, Russia)
- Xylococcus quercicola Danzig, 1980 (Russia)
- † Xylococcus grabenhorsti Koteja, 2008
- † Xylococcus kutscheri Koteja, 2008
