= Xylococcidae =

Scientific classification
- Domain: Eukaryota
- Kingdom: Animalia
- Phylum: Arthropoda
- Class: Insecta
- Order: Hemiptera
- Suborder: Sternorrhyncha
- Infraorder: Coccomorpha
- Superfamily: Coccoidea
- Family: Xylococcidae; Pergrande, 1898

Family of true bugs

Xylococcidae is a family of scales and mealybugs in the order Hemiptera. There are at least 4 genera and about 11 described species in Xylococcidae.

== Genera ==
These four genera belong to the family Xylococcidae:

- Jansenus Foldi, 1997
- Xylococculus Morrison, 1927
- Xylococcus Lôw, 1882
- † Baisococcus Koteja, 1989
