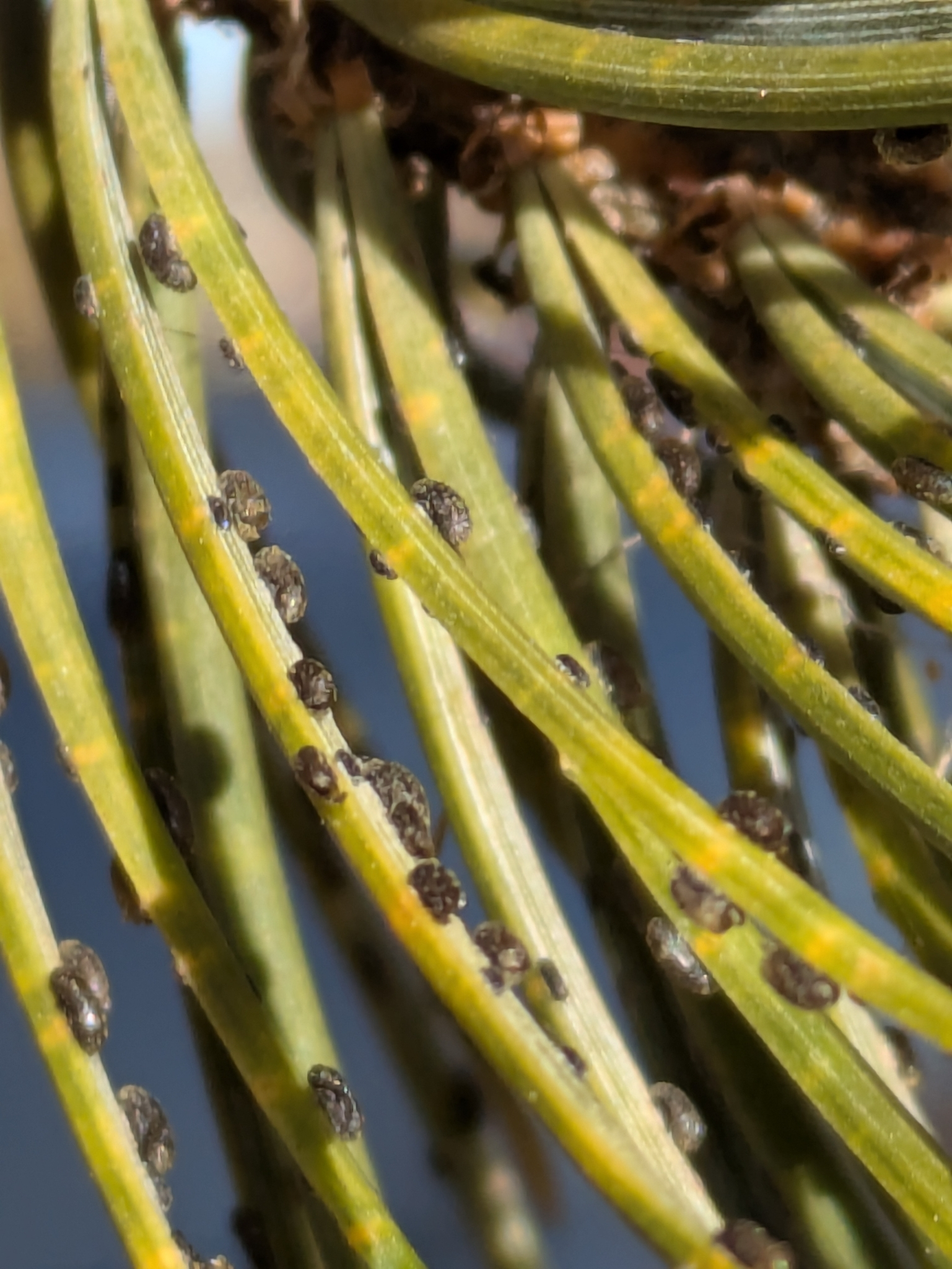
- Matsucoccus acalyptus

Scientific classification
- Kingdom: Animalia
- Phylum: Arthropoda
- Class: Insecta
- Order: Hemiptera
- Suborder: Sternorrhyncha
- Infraorder: Coccomorpha
- Superfamily: Coccoidea
- Family: Matsucoccidae; Morrison, 1927

= Matsucoccidae =

Family of true bugs

Matsucoccidae is a family of scales and mealybugs in the order Hemiptera. There are at least 2 genera and more than 40 described species in Matsucoccidae.

== Genera ==
These two genera belong to the family Matsucoccidae:

- Matsucoccus Cockerell, 1909
- † Eomatsucoccus Koteja, 1988
