= Matsucoccus =

Scientific classification
- Kingdom: Animalia
- Phylum: Arthropoda
- Clade: Pancrustacea
- Class: Insecta
- Order: Hemiptera
- Suborder: Sternorrhyncha
- Family: Matsucoccidae
- Genus: Matsucoccus; Cockerell, 1909

Genus of true bugs

Matsucoccus is a genus of scale insects of the family Matsucoccidae.
