= Marmyan =

Marmyan Temporal range: Albian – Cenomanian

Scientific classification
- Kingdom: Animalia
- Phylum: Arthropoda
- Class: Insecta
- Order: Hemiptera
- Suborder: Sternorrhyncha
- Family: incertae sedis
- Genus: †Marmyan
- Species: †M. barbarae

Binomial name
- †Marmyan barbarae Koteja, 2004

Extinct genus of true bugs

Marmyan is an extinct genus of scale insect, containing a single species, Marmyan barbarae and unplaced in any coccid family. The genus is solely known from the Albian – Cenomanian Burmese amber deposits.

== History and classification ==
Marmyan is known from the holotype specimen, collection number BMNH In. 20160(1), which along several other insects of different orders, are inclusions in a transparent chunk of Burmese amber. As of 2004, the type insect was part of the amber collections housed at the British Museum of Natural History, London, England. The amber specimen was recovered from deposits exposed in the Hukawng Valley of Kachin State, Myanmar. Burmese amber has been radiometrically dated using U-Pb isotopes, yielding an age of approximately 99 million years, close to the Aptian – Cenomanian boundary.

The holotype was first studied by paleoentomologist and coccid researcher Jan Koteja, of the Agricultural University of Kraków. Kotejas's 2004 type description of the genus and species was published in the Journal of Systematic Palaeontology. He coined the specific epithet barbarae to honor the Polish paleoentomologist and hempiteran researcher Barbara Ogaza, who started fossil coccid research in Poland. The genus name, Marmyan, is an anagram created from the name "Myanmar", where the amber is found.

Marmyan is one of three Burmese amber coccid genera that Koteja described in the same paper, the other two being Burmacoccus and Albicoccus placed into the monotypic families Burmacoccidae and Albicoccidae respectively. He placed Marmyan into the neococcid group of scale insects based on a combination of characters that indicate a relationship to the primitive families Putoidae, Pseudococcidae, Eriococcidae but not found in any one particular family. A phylogenetic analysis of coccid males from a number of families was performed by Hodgson and Hardy in 2013. The extinct genera Albicoccus, Apticoccus, Grimaldiella, Kukaspis, Marmyan, Palaeosteingelia, Palaeotupo, Solicoccus, Turonicoccus and possibly Pennygullania, all with simple rows of eyes, were found to form a clade that included Burmacoccus. The clade also includes the modern families Putoidae, Steingeliidae and Pityococcidae plus the neococcoids clade as a group. A second phylogenetic review of coccids was performed by Vea and Grimaldi in 2015 and incorporated a number of new fossil taxa. In contrast to the work of Hodgson and Hardy, the 2015 analysis recovered Marmyan as a neoccoid genus sister to the family Eriococcidae, as was suggested by Koteja.

== Description ==
The single described adult male is approximately 870–900 μm (0.034–0.035 in) long, with hyaline wings, but incomplete. The head and part of the thorax were lost when a hole was bored through the amber for threading onto a string. Koteja assumed the head would have borne reduced eye structuring as other primitive neococcids. The antennae are composed of ten segments, with the pedicel being the similar in length to surrounding segments which are nodose in shape and get slowly smaller from base to tip. The antennae are covered in many setae, but the sensilla are not discernible. The fore-wings are about 720 μm (0.028 in) long, with discernible microtrichia, but due to the folding of the wings the presence of an alar lobe was not confirmed. The hind-wings in other genera are modified into elongated halteres, but due to positioning in the amber, they are not detectable on the type specimen. The abdomen is broad and generally slightly oblong in outline, with two long setae on the developed apical lobes. There are apical setae are associated with probable glandular pouches and the body is associated with detached waxy filaments. The peniel sheath is divided into a basal rounded section and a narrow style, slightly downward curved, with pointed end.
