= Burmacoccus =

Burmacoccus Temporal range: Albian – Cenomanian

Scientific classification
- Domain: Eukaryota
- Kingdom: Animalia
- Phylum: Arthropoda
- Class: Insecta
- Order: Hemiptera
- Suborder: Sternorrhyncha
- Family: †Burmacoccidae
- Genus: †Burmacoccus
- Species: †B. danyi

Binomial name
- †Burmacoccus danyi Koteja, 2004

Extinct genus of true bugs

Burmacoccus is an extinct genus of scale insect in the extinct monotypic family Burmacoccidae, containing a single species, Burmacoccus danyi. The genus is solely known from the Albian – Cenomanian Burmese amber deposits.

== History and classification ==
Burmacoccus is known from the holotype specimen, collection number BMNH In. 20708, which is an inclusion in a transparent chunk of Burmese amber. As of 2004, the type insect was part of the amber collections housed at the British Museum of Natural History, London, England. The amber specimen was recovered from deposits exposed in the Hukawng Valley of Kachin State, Myanmar. Burmese amber has been radiometrically dated using U-Pb isotopes, yielding an age of approximately 99 million years old, close to the Aptian – Cenomanian boundary.

The holotype was first studied by paleoentomologist and coccid researcher Jan Koteja, of the Agricultural University of Kraków. Kotejas 2004 type description of the family, genus and species was published in the Journal of Systematic Palaeontology. He coined the specific epithet danyi to honor the Lebanese amber researcher Dany Azar, who assisted Koteja with fossil coccid research. The family name is a derivative of the genus name Burmacoccus, itself a derivation of Burma, the former name of Myanmar, and "coccus" a common genus name suffix for scale insects.

Burmacoccus is one of three Burmese amber coccid genera that Koteja described in the same paper, the other two being Albicoccus, monotypic to the family Albicoccidae, and the incertae sedis genus Marmyan. He placed Burmacoccus into the monotypic family Burmacoccidae based on the combination of characters that indicate a relationship to the archaeococcoid group scale insects, but are not found in any one particular family. Koteja noted the scutellum shape indicates a possible relationship to the family Monophlebidae, however the wing venation is very different between the two families. Another similar family, known from New Jersey amber is Grimaldiidae. In that family though, the eye has a single row of ommatidia, while in Burmacoccus the ommatidia are grouped into a compound eye rather than placed in a row. Phylogenetic analysis of coccid males from a number of families was performed by Hodgson and Hardy in 2013. The extinct genera Albicoccus, Apticoccus, Grimaldiella, Kukaspis, Marmyan, Palaeosteingelia, Palaeotupo, Solicoccus, Turonicoccus and possibly Pennygullania, all with simple rows of eyes, were found to form a clade that included Burmacoccus. The clade also includes the modern families Putoidae, Steingeliidae and Pityococcidae plus the neococcoids clade as a group.

== Description ==
The single described adult male is approximately 1,300 μm (0.051 in) long, with hyaline wings. The details of the head are not readily discernible, being obscured by one wing, but the eyes are clearly composed of approximately fifteen ommatidia grouped into a compound eye. The antennae are composed of ten segments, with the pedicel being the longest segment and the joints between the segments bearing numerous setae. The fore-wings are about 1,050 μm (0.041 in) long, with microtrichia, and a small but distinct lobe which couples with the hamuli. The hind-wings are modified into elongated halteres bearing two developed hamuli. The abdomen is conical in outline, narrowing towards the tip, with two short setae and having a developed penial sheath. The sheath is divided into a basal rounded section and a narrow style with pointed end. The abdomen is translucent enough for the preserved testes to be visible.
