= Albicoccus =

Albicoccus Temporal range: Late Albian - Early Cenomanian

Scientific classification
- Domain: Eukaryota
- Kingdom: Animalia
- Phylum: Arthropoda
- Class: Insecta
- Order: Hemiptera
- Suborder: Sternorrhyncha
- Family: †Albicoccidae
- Genus: †Albicoccus
- Species: †A. dimai

Binomial name
- †Albicoccus dimai Koteja, 2004

Extinct genus of true bugs

Albicoccus is an extinct genus of scale insect in the extinct monotypic family Albicoccidae, containing a single species, Albicoccus dimai. The genus is solely known from the Albian - Cenomanian Burmese amber deposits.

== History and classification ==
Albicoccus is known from the holotype specimen, collection number BMNH In. 20155(2), which along a limoniid and a psychodid fly, are inclusions in a transparent chunk of Burmese amber.
As of 2004, the type insect was part of the amber collections housed at the British Museum of Natural History, London, England. The amber specimen was recovered from deposits exposed in the Hukawng Valley of Kachin State, Myanmar. Burmese amber has been radiometrically dated using U-Pb isotopes, yielding an age of approximately 99 million years old, close to the Albian – Cenomanian boundary.

The holotype was first studied by paleoentomologist and coccid researcher Jan Koteja, of the Agricultural University of Kraków. Kotejas 2004 type description of the family, genus and species was published in the Journal of Systematic Palaeontology. He coined the specific epithet dimai to honor the Russian paleoentomologist and hemipteran researcher Dmitri (Dima) Shcherbakov, who assisted Koteja with fossil coccid research.
The family name is a derivative of the genus name Albicoccus, itself a derivation of Albian, the age of the amber deposits, and "coccus" a common genus name suffix for scale insects.

Albicoccus is one of three Burmese amber coccid genera that Koteja described in the same paper, the other two being Burmacoccus, monotypic to the family Burmacoccidae, and the incertae sedis genus Marmyan. He placed Albicoccus into the monotypic family Albicoccidae based on the combination of characters that indicate a relationship to the archaeococcoid group scale insects, but are not found in any one particular family. Koteja noted the reduced eye structuring is similar to other groups with reduced eyes, but the placement of the ommatidia rows are lateral rather than in oblique or perpendicular rows. The abdomen has two pairs of setae near the end, a feature that is similar to the New Jersey amber genus Turonicoccus, but all other features differ.
A phylogenetic analysis of coccid males from a number of families was performed by Hodgson and Hardy in 2013. The extinct genera Albicoccus, Apticoccus, Grimaldiella, Kukaspis, Marmyan, Palaeosteingelia, Palaeotupo, Solicoccus, Turonicoccus and possibly Pennygullania, all with simple rows of eyes, were found to form a clade that included Burmacoccus. The clade also includes the modern families Putoidae, Steingeliidae and Pityococcidae plus the neococcoids clade as a group. A second phylogenetic review of coccids was performed by Vea and Grimaldi in 2015 and incorporated a number of new fossil taxa. In contrast to the work of Both Koteja and Hodgson and Hardy, the 2015 analysis recovered Albicoccus as a neoccoid genus along with the fossil genera Kuenowicoccus, Pennygullania, and Inka.

== Description ==
The single described adult male is approximately 870 μm (0.034 in) long, with hyaline wings. The details of the head are not readily discernible, being obscured by one wing, but the eyes are clearly composed of approximately four ommatidia and an ocellus. The antennae are composed of ten segments, with the pedicel being the longest segment and the other segments tending towards being barbell shaped. The fore-wings are about 700 μm (0.028 in) long, without discernible microtrichia. The hind-wings in other genera are modified into elongated halteres, but due to positioning in the amber, they are not detectable on the type specimen. The abdomen is conical in outline, narrowing towards the tip, with two very long setae on each side and having a developed penial sheath. The setae do not have any visible wax secretions associated with them. The sheath is divided into a basal rounded section and a narrow style, slightly downward curved, with pointed end.

== Pathogens ==
An undescribed male albicoccid trapped in Burmese amber played host to the ancient parasitic fungus Paleoophiocordyceps coccophagus, with two whip-like fruiting bodies emerging from the animal's head.
