= Micrococcidae =

Scientific classification
- Domain: Eukaryota
- Kingdom: Animalia
- Phylum: Arthropoda
- Class: Insecta
- Order: Hemiptera
- Suborder: Sternorrhyncha
- Infraorder: Coccomorpha
- Superfamily: Coccoidea
- Family: Micrococcidae; Silvestri, 1939

Genera
- See text

Family of scale insects from the Mediterranean region

Micrococcidae is a family of scale insects commonly known as the Mediterranean scales. There are two genera and eight species. Members of this family are found in Cyprus, Italy and other Mediterranean countries including Egypt, France, Greece, Israel, Lebanon, Libya, Syria and Turkey.

== Taxonomy ==
Members of this family feed on monocotyledonous hosts as do members of the Aclerdidae which is believed to be a sister clade. The Asterolecanoid taxa form a well-defined group of families which also includes the Asterolecaniidae, Cerococcidae, Lecanodiaspididae and Pollinia pollini. The placement of the latter is problematic as it seems to be the sister group to the rest of the Asterolecanoid taxa.

== Biology ==
Adult females are broadly oval with six legs and a pair of antennae. They can be distinguished from members of other scale families by the fact that the vulvae are found on abdominal segment VI rather than on segment VIII. There are usually four female and five male instars.

== Genera ==
- Micrococcus
- Molluscococcus
