= Lecanodiaspis acaciae =

Scientific classification
- Kingdom: Animalia
- Phylum: Arthropoda
- Clade: Pancrustacea
- Class: Insecta
- Order: Hemiptera
- Suborder: Sternorrhyncha
- Family: Lecanodiaspididae
- Genus: Lecanodiaspis
- Species: L. acaciae

Binomial name
- Lecanodiaspis acaciae (Maskell, 1893)

Species of true bug

Lecanodiaspis acaciae is a species of scale insect of the family Lecanodiaspididae. The species was described by Maskell in 1893.
