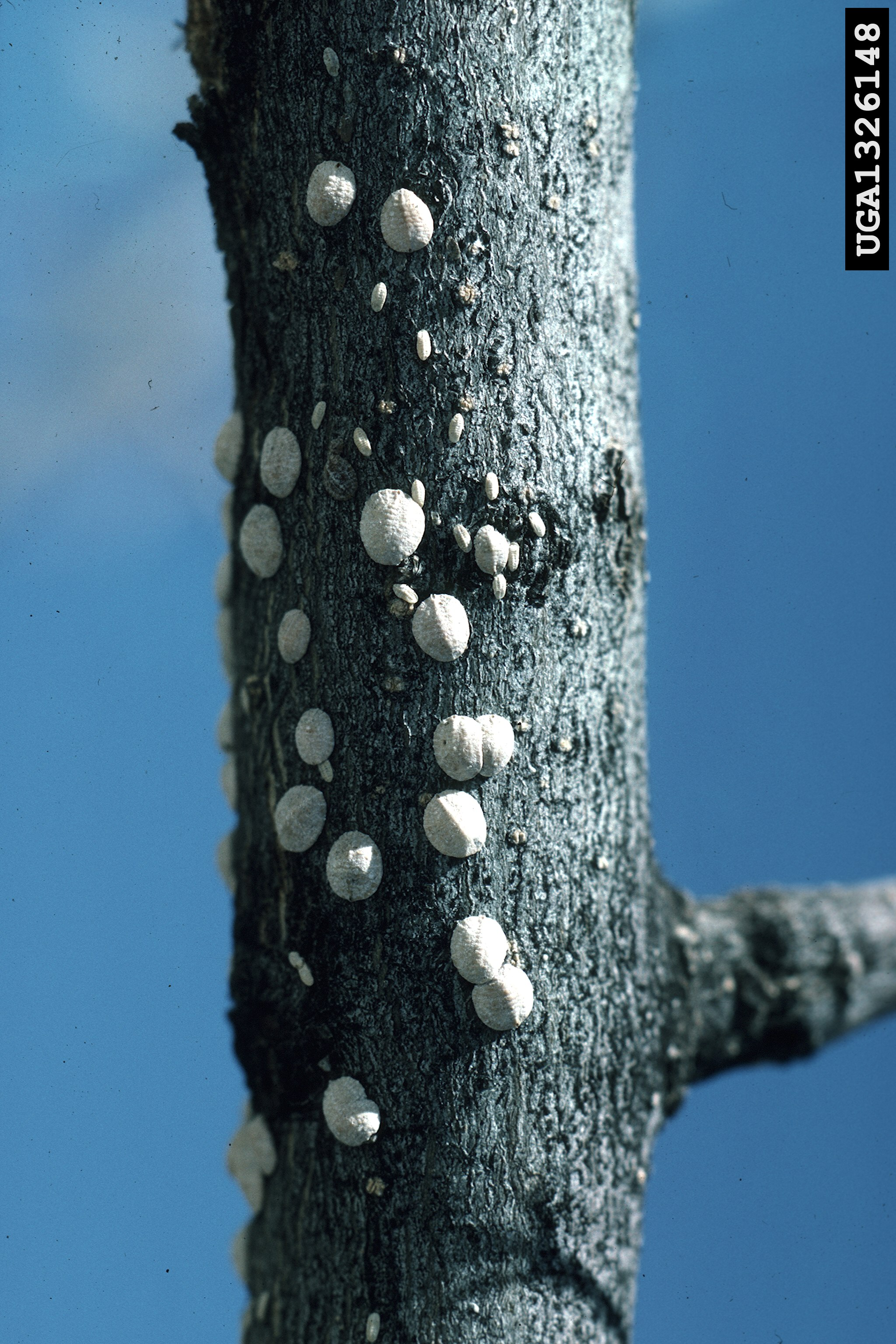
- Lecanodiaspis prosopidis on green ash branch

Scientific classification
- Kingdom: Animalia
- Phylum: Arthropoda
- Clade: Pancrustacea
- Class: Insecta
- Order: Hemiptera
- Suborder: Sternorrhyncha
- Family: Lecanodiaspididae
- Genus: Lecanodiaspis
- Species: L. prosopidis

Binomial name
- Lecanodiaspis prosopidis (Maskell, 1895)

= Lecanodiaspis prosopidis =

Species of true bug

Lecanodiaspis prosopidis is a species of scale insect of the family Lecanodiaspididae. The species was described by Maskell in 1895.
