= Lecanodiaspis microcribraria =

Scientific classification
- Kingdom: Animalia
- Phylum: Arthropoda
- Clade: Pancrustacea
- Class: Insecta
- Order: Hemiptera
- Suborder: Sternorrhyncha
- Family: Lecanodiaspididae
- Genus: Lecanodiaspis
- Species: L. microcribraria

Binomial name
- Lecanodiaspis microcribraria Froggatt, 1915

Species of true bug

Lecanodiaspis microcribraria is a species of scale insect of the family Lecanodiaspididae. It was described in 1915 by Australian entomologist W.W. Froggatt.
