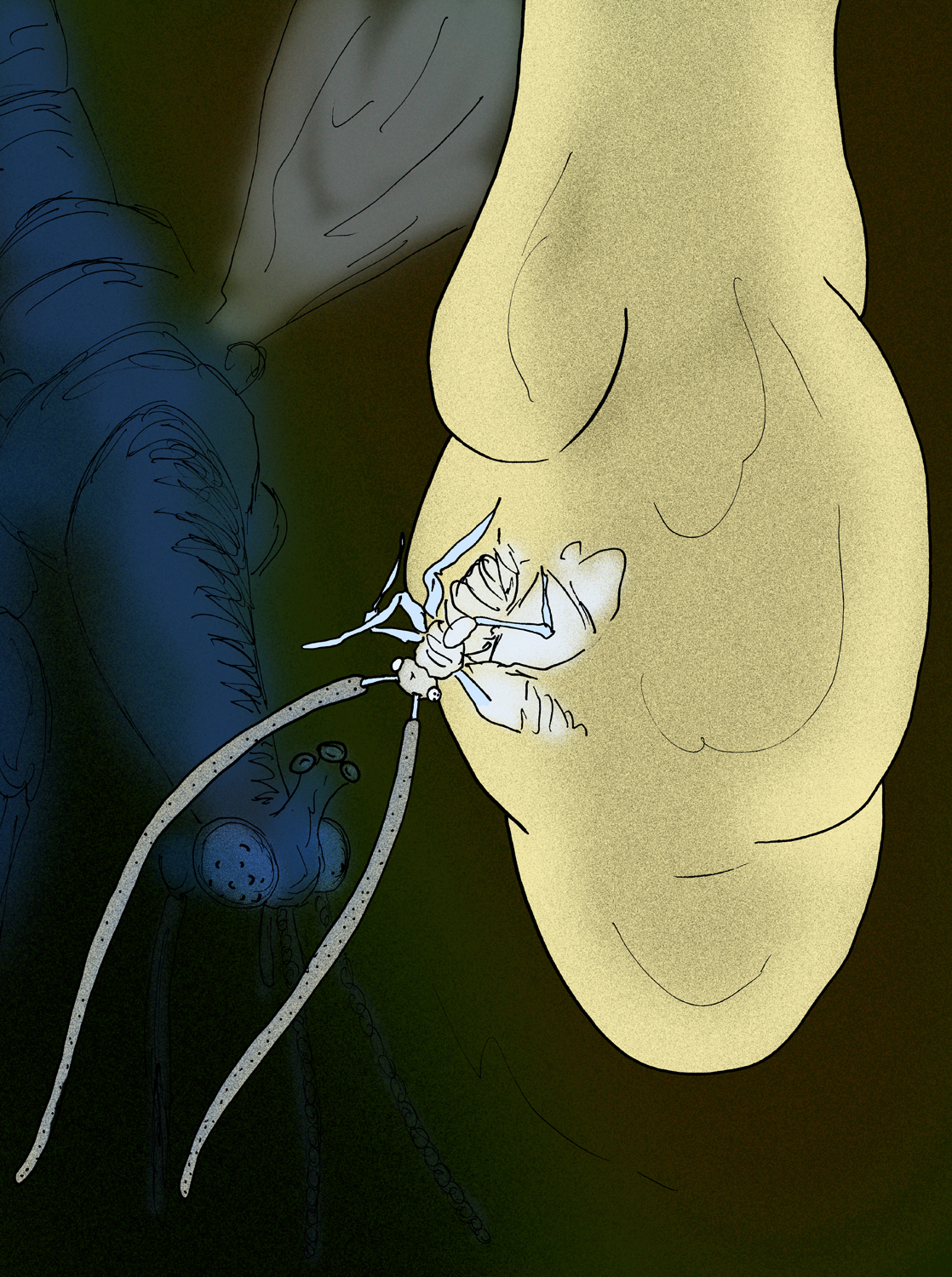

Scientific classification
- Kingdom: Fungi
- Division: Ascomycota
- Class: Sordariomycetes
- Order: Hypocreales
- Family: Ophiocordycipitaceae
- Genus: Paleoophiocordyceps; Sung, et al., 2008
- Species: P. coccophagus

Binomial name
- Paleoophiocordyceps coccophagus Sung, et al., 2008

= Paleoophiocordyceps =

Extinct genus of fungi

Paleoophiocordyceps coccophagus is an extinct parasitic fungus in the family Ophiocordycipitaceae from Cretaceous-aged Burmese amber. P. coccophagus' morphology is very similar to the species of Ophiocordyceps. The only known specimen consists of two whip-like fruiting bodies emerging from the head of a male scale insect of an undescribed species very similar to the extinct species Albicoccus dimai.
