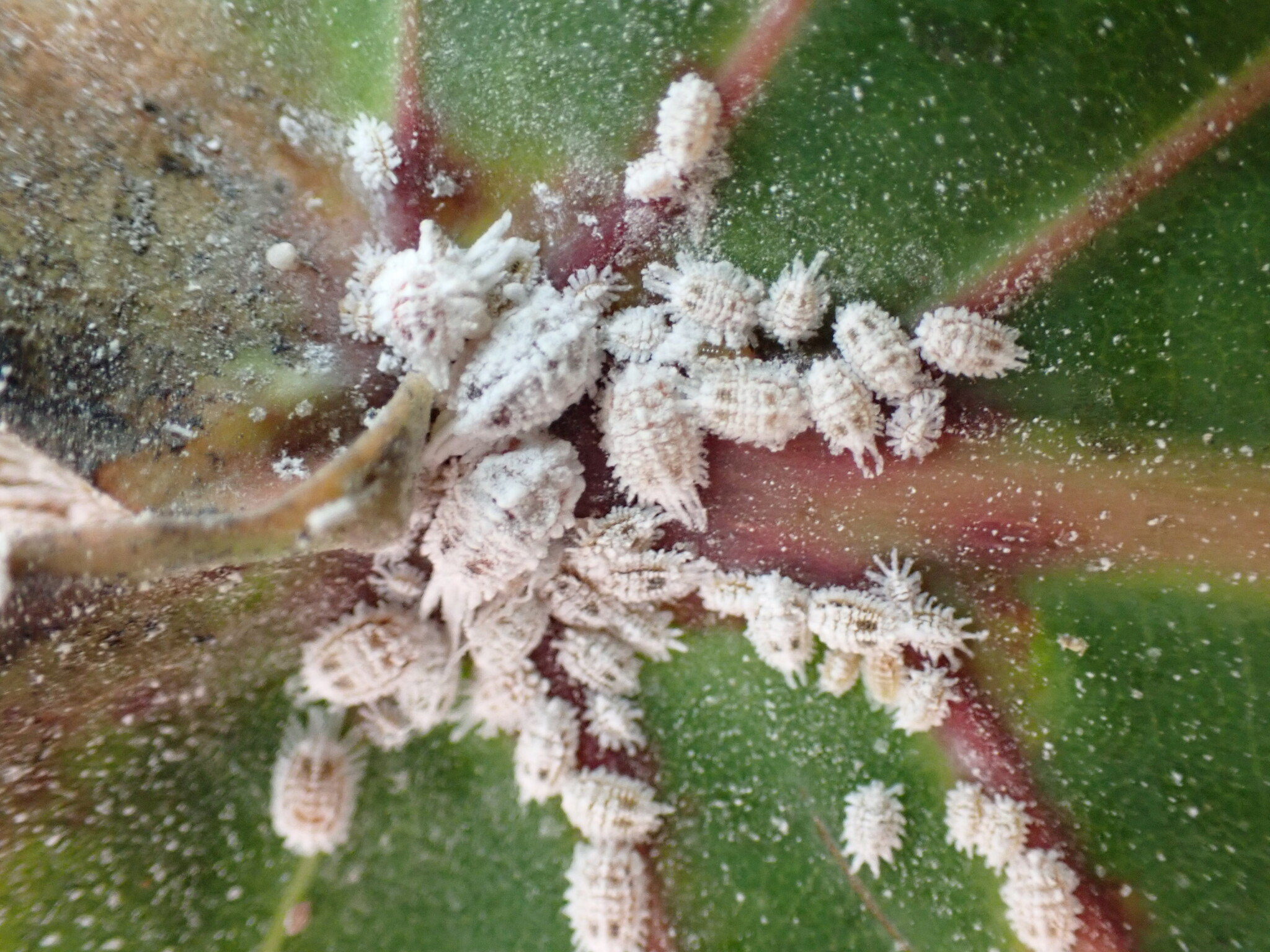
- Puto barberi in Tenerife

Scientific classification
- Kingdom: Animalia
- Phylum: Arthropoda
- Clade: Pancrustacea
- Class: Insecta
- Order: Hemiptera
- Suborder: Sternorrhyncha
- Superfamily: Coccoidea
- Family: Putoidae
- Genus: Puto; Signoret, 1875

Synonyms
- Macrocerococcus Leonardi, 1907

= Puto (bug) =

Genus of true bugs

Puto is a genus of insects described as giant mealybugs, although it is the only extant genus in different family Putoidae; it was originally described by Victor Antoine Signoret in 1875.

== Hosts ==
Giant mealybugs occur on a wide range of hosts, each species having its own specific host. Host plants commonly include conifers, grasses and various woody shrubs. All parts of the plant can be infested.

== Description ==
The adult female is oval and up to five millimetres long and concealed by tufts of powdery white wax. If the wax is removed, two longitudinal black stripes can be seen on the upper surface of the body and the wax glands are large and conspicuous. The legs and antennae are well developed and a dark colour.

== Life cycle ==
There are generally four instars in the female and five in the male. In many species there is a single generation each year and the first instar is the overwintering stage. Puto sandini however takes four years to complete its life cycle.

== Species ==
The current scientific consensus appears to be based on the two-subgenus proposal by Gavrilov-Zimin & Danzig; the following species, recorded from the Americas, mainland Europe and SE Asia, are included in BioLib.cz (as separate genera):

=== Puto subgenus Ceroputo ===
Authority: Šulc, 1897

1. Puto (Ceroputo) graminis Danzig, 1972
2. Puto (Ceroputo) liquidambaris Zhang & Watson, 2023
3. Puto (Ceroputo) mimicus (McKenzie, 1967)
4. Puto (Ceroputo) pilosellae Šulc, 1898 ("hairy mealybug")
5. Puto (Ceroputo) vaccinii Danzig, 1897

=== Puto subgenus Puto ===
Authority: Signoret, 1875 - list incomplete:

- Puto antennatus Signoret, 1875 ("conifer mealybug")
- Puto acirculus
- Puto albicans
- Puto ambigua
- Puto ambiguus
- Puto antennatus
- Puto antioquensis
- Puto arctostaphyli
- Puto atriplicis
- Puto barberi
- Puto borealis
- Puto brunnitarsis (Signoret, 1875)
- Puto bryanthi
- Puto calcitectus
- Puto californicus
- Puto cupressi
- Puto decorosus
- Puto echinatus
- Puto euphorbiaefolius
- Puto israelensis Ben-Dov, 2001
- Puto janetscheki Balachowsky, 1953
- Puto kosztarabi
- Puto lasiorum
- Puto laticribellum
- Puto mexicanus
- Puto marsicanus Marotta & Tranfaglia, 1993
- Puto mimicus
- Puto nulliporus
- Puto orientalis Danzig, 1978
- Puto pacificus
- Puto palinuri Marotta & Tranfaglia, 1993
- Puto pricei
- Puto profusus
- Puto sandini Washburn, 1965
- Puto simmondsiae
- Puto superbus (Leonardi, 1907)
- Puto yuccae
