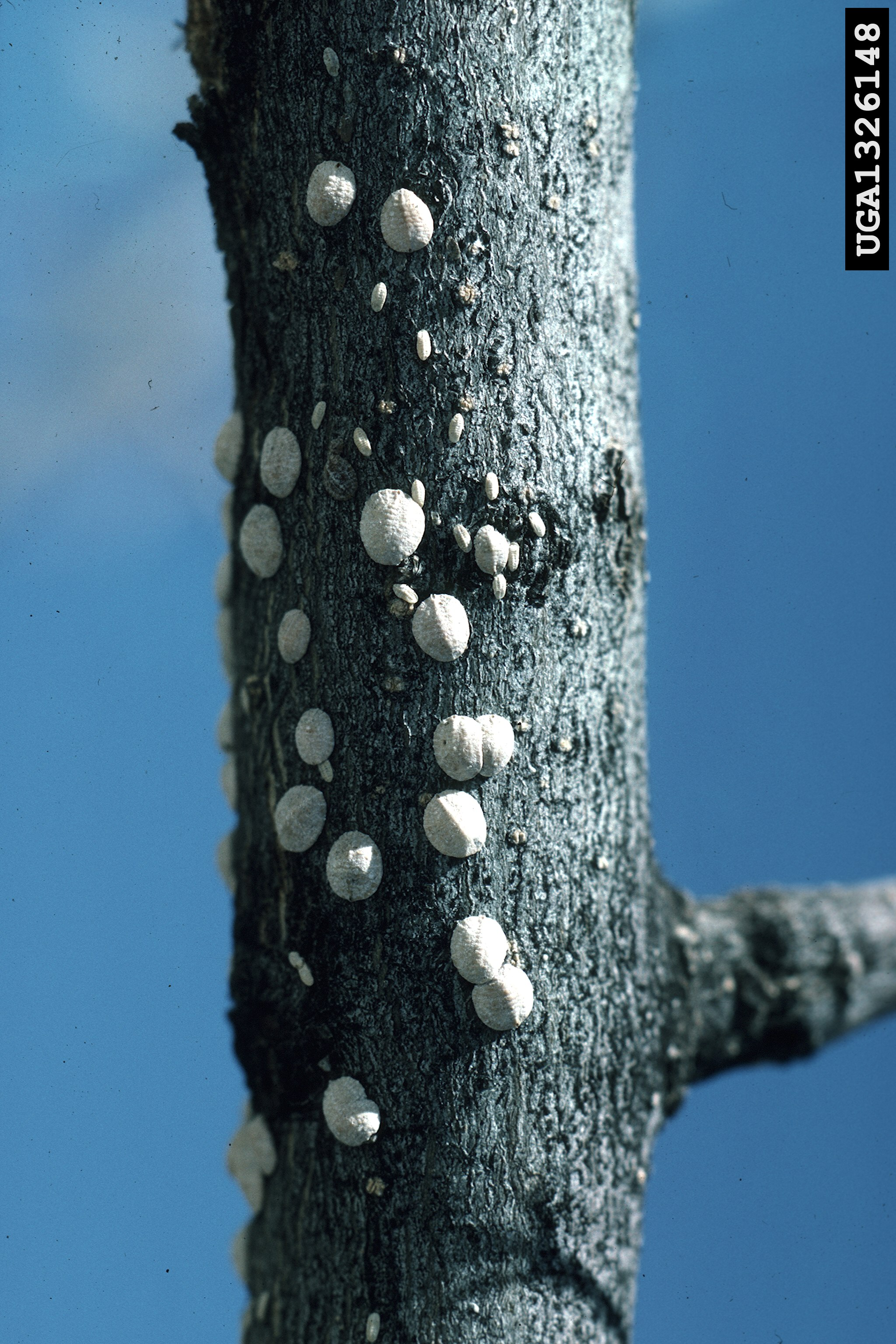
- Lecanodiaspis prosopidis on green ash branch

Scientific classification
- Kingdom: Animalia
- Phylum: Arthropoda
- Clade: Pancrustacea
- Class: Insecta
- Order: Hemiptera
- Suborder: Sternorrhyncha
- Family: Lecanodiaspididae
- Genus: Lecanodiaspis; Targioni Tozzetti, 1869

= Lecanodiaspis =

Genus of true bugs

Lecanodiaspis is a genus of scale insects of the family Lecanodiaspididae described by Targioni Tozzetti in 1869.

Species:

- Lecanodiaspis acaciae (Maskell, 1893)
- Lecanodiaspis africana (Newstead, 1911)
- Lecanodiaspis albilineata Williams & Kosztarab, 1970
- Lecanodiaspis anomala (Green, 1900)
- Lecanodiaspis atherospermae (Maskell, 1896)
- Lecanodiaspis australis Howell & Kosztarab, 1972
- Lecanodiaspis baculifera Leonardi, 1907
- Lecanodiaspis brabei (Brain, 1920)
- Lecanodiaspis brachystegiae (Hall, 1935)
- Lecanodiaspis brookesae Howell & Kosztarab, 1972
- Lecanodiaspis casuarinae Williams & Watson, 1990
- Lecanodiaspis convexa (Froggatt, 1915)
- Lecanodiaspis crassispina Howell & Kosztarab, 1972
- Lecanodiaspis cremastogastri (Takahashi, 1929)
- Lecanodiaspis dealbatae Lambdin
- Lecanodiaspis dendrobii (Douglas, 1892)
- Lecanodiaspis dilatata (Froggatt, 1915)
- Lecanodiaspis distincta Howell & Kosztarab, 1972
- Lecanodiaspis dorsospinosa Hodgson, 1973
- Lecanodiaspis elongata (Ferris, 1950)
- Lecanodiaspis elytropappi (Munting & Giliomee, 1967)
- Lecanodiaspis eremocitri Howell & Kosztarab, 1972
- Lecanodiaspis erica Hodgson, 1973
- Lecanodiaspis erratica (De Lotto, 1955)
- Lecanodiaspis esperancei Howell
- Lecanodiaspis eucalypti (Maskell, 1893)
- Lecanodiaspis frenchi (Froggatt, 1915)
- Lecanodiaspis greeni (Takahashi, 1950)
- Lecanodiaspis hodgsoni Howell & Kosztarab, 1972
- Lecanodiaspis ingae Howell & Kosztarab, 1972
- Lecanodiaspis magna (Brain, 1920)
- Lecanodiaspis majesticus Wang & Qiu, 1986
- Lecanodiaspis malaboda (Green, 1909)
- Lecanodiaspis melaleucae (Fuller, 1897)
- Lecanodiaspis microcribraria (Froggatt, 1915)
- Lecanodiaspis mimosae (Maskell, 1897)
- Lecanodiaspis morrisoni (Takahashi, 1950)
- Lecanodiaspis murphyi Lambdin
- Lecanodiaspis natalensis (Brain, 1920)
- Lecanodiaspis newmani (Froggatt, 1915)
- Lecanodiaspis parinarii (Hall, 1935)
- Lecanodiaspis parthenii Howell & Kosztarab, 1972
- Lecanodiaspis prosopidis (Maskell, 1895)
- Lecanodiaspis rufescens (Cockerell, 1893)
- Lecanodiaspis rugosa (Hempel, 1900)
- Lecanodiaspis russellae Howell & Kosztarab, 1972
- Lecanodiaspis sardoa Targioni Tozzetti, 1869
- Lecanodiaspis subterranea Kosztarab & Howell, 1978
- Lecanodiaspis takagii Howell & Kosztarab, 1972
- Lecanodiaspis tapirirae (Ferris & Kelly, 1923)
- Lecanodiaspis tarsalis (Newstead, 1917)
- Lecanodiaspis thamnosmae (Ferris, 1955)
- Lecanodiaspis varioseta Howell & Kosztarab, 1972
- Lecanodiaspis yuccae (Townsend, 1892)
- Lecanodiaspis zygophylli Hodgson, 1973
