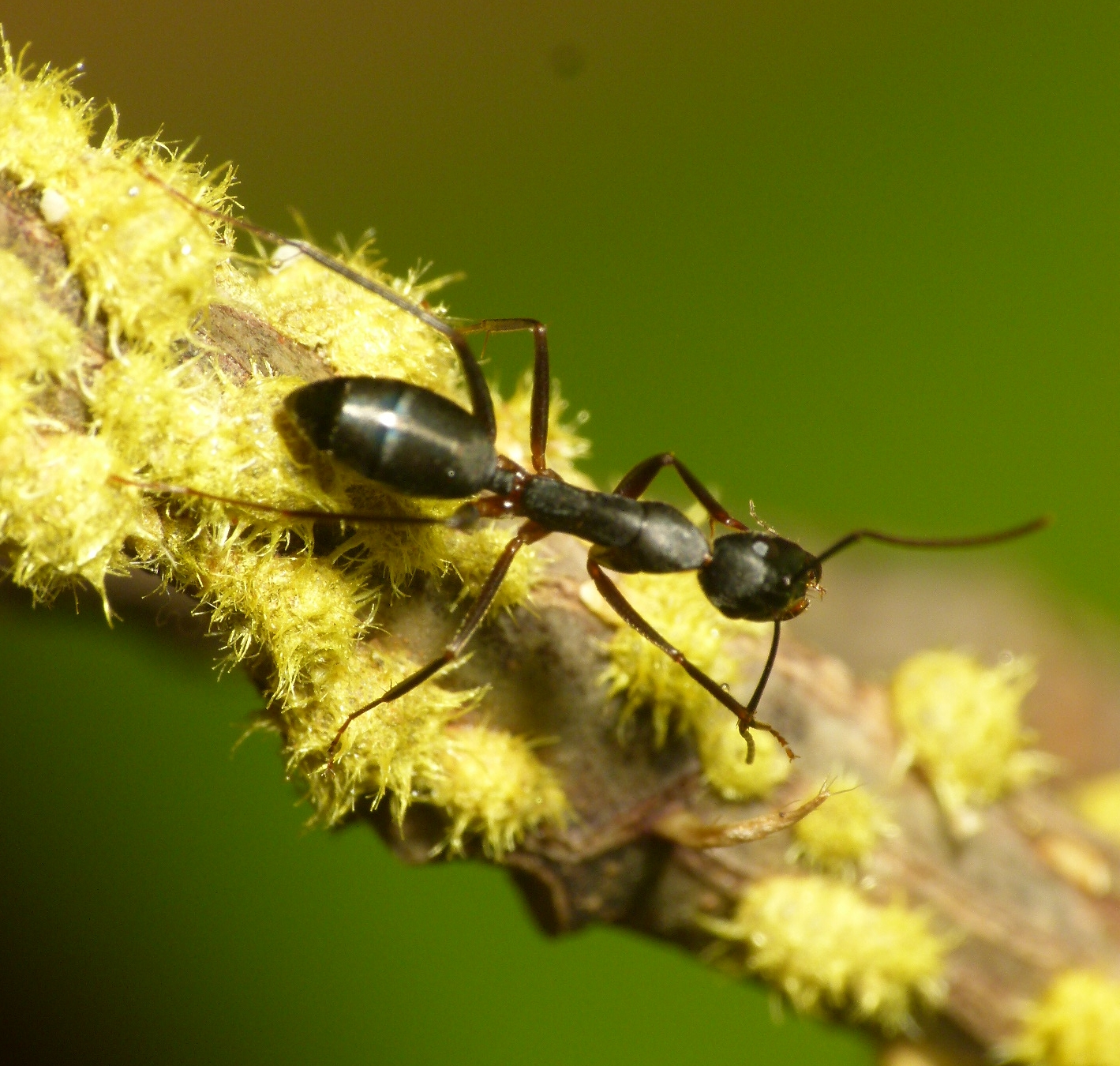
- Antecerococcus indicus (with an attendant ant Camponotus sp.) is common on Hibiscus spp.

Scientific classification
- Domain: Eukaryota
- Kingdom: Animalia
- Phylum: Arthropoda
- Class: Insecta
- Order: Hemiptera
- Suborder: Sternorrhyncha
- Family: Cerococcidae
- Genus: Antecerococcus; Green, 1901

Type species
- Cerococcus punctiferus Green, 1901

= Antecerococcus =

Genus of true bugs

Antecerococcus is a genus of scale insects. They are found worldwide but with greater abundance in the Old World. There are about 56 species:

- Antecerococcus albospicatus (Green, 1909)
- Antecerococcus alluaudi (Marchal, 1904)
- Antecerococcus andamanensis Hodgson & Williams, 2016
- Antecerococcus ankaratrae (Mamet, 1954)
- Antecerococcus asparagi (Joubert, 1925)
- Antecerococcus baccharidis (Hempel, 1900)
- Antecerococcus badius (Leonardi, 1911)
- Antecerococcus bryoides (Maskell, 1894)
- Antecerococcus camarai (Neves, 1954)
- Antecerococcus capensis Hodgson & Williams, 2016
- Antecerococcus cistarum (Balachowsky, 1927)
- Antecerococcus citri (Lambdin, 1986)
- Antecerococcus cliffortiae (Joubert, 1925)
- Antecerococcus corokiae (Maskell, 1890)
- Antecerococcus delottoi Hodgson & Williams, 2016
- Antecerococcus dumonti (Vayssière, 1927)
- Antecerococcus echinatus (Wang & Qiu, 1986)
- Antecerococcus eremobius (Scott, 1907)
- Antecerococcus fradei (Castel-Branco, 1952)
- Antecerococcus froggatti (Morrison & Morrison, 1927)
- Antecerococcus gabonensis (Lambdin, 1983)
- Antecerococcus gallicolus (Mamet, 1959)
- Antecerococcus hilli Hodgson & Williams, 2016
- Antecerococcus indicus (Maskell, 1897)
- Antecerococcus insleyae Hodgson & Williams, 2016
- Antecerococcus intermedius (Balachowsky, 1930)
- Antecerococcus kakamegae Hodgson & Williams, 2016
- Antecerococcus keralae Hodgson & Williams, 2016
- Antecerococcus kurraensis Hodgson & Williams, 2016
- Antecerococcus laniger (Goux, 1932)
- Antecerococcus lizeri (Granara de Willink, 1996)
- Antecerococcus longipilosus (Archangelskaya, 1930)
- Antecerococcus madagascariensis (Mamet, 1959)
- Antecerococcus mirandae (Lambdin, 1987)
- Antecerococcus muntingi Hodgson & Williams, 2016
- Antecerococcus oranensis (Balachowsky, 1941)
- Antecerococcus ornatus (Green, 1909)
- Antecerococcus oumeensis Hodgson & Williams, 2016
- Antecerococcus ovoides (Cockerell, 1901)
- Antecerococcus paradoxus (Maskell, 1889)
- Antecerococcus parahybensis (Hempel, 1927)
- Antecerococcus passerinae (Brain, 1920)
- Antecerococcus perowskiae (Archangelskaya, 1931)
- Antecerococcus philippiae (Lambdin & Kosztarab, 1977)
- Antecerococcus pileae (Mamet, 1950)
- Antecerococcus pocilliferus (Neves, 1954)
- Antecerococcus roseus (Green, 1909)
- Antecerococcus royenae (Brain, 1920)
- Antecerococcus ruber (Balachowsky, 1930)
- Antecerococcus sparsiporus Hodgson & Williams, 2016
- Antecerococcus stellatus (Maskell, 1897)
- Antecerococcus steppicus (Balachowsky, 1941)
- Antecerococcus thesii Hodgson & Williams, 2016
- Antecerococcus theydoni (Hall, 1935)
- Antecerococcus yemenicus Hodgson & Williams, 2016
- Antecerococcus zapotlanus (Cockerell, 1903)
