= Gallacoccus =

Scientific classification
- Domain: Eukaryota
- Kingdom: Animalia
- Phylum: Arthropoda
- Class: Insecta
- Order: Hemiptera
- Suborder: Sternorrhyncha
- Superfamily: Coccoidea
- Family: Eriococcidae
- Genus: Gallacoccus; Beardsley, 1971

Genus of true bugs

Gallacoccus is a genus of the scale insects commonly known as beesoniids. They typically cause galls on their plant hosts. Gallacoccus anthonyae is the type species. Female members of the genus Gallacoccus have only three instars, in contrast to the other beesoniid genera where the females have four.

== Species ==
These four species belong to the genus Gallacoccus:

- Gallacoccus anthonyae Beardsley, 1971 (Singapore)
- Gallacoccus heckrothi Takagi, 2001 (Malaysia)
- Gallacoccus secundus Beardsley, 1971 (Singapore)
- Gallacoccus spinigalla Takagi, 2001 (Malaysia)
