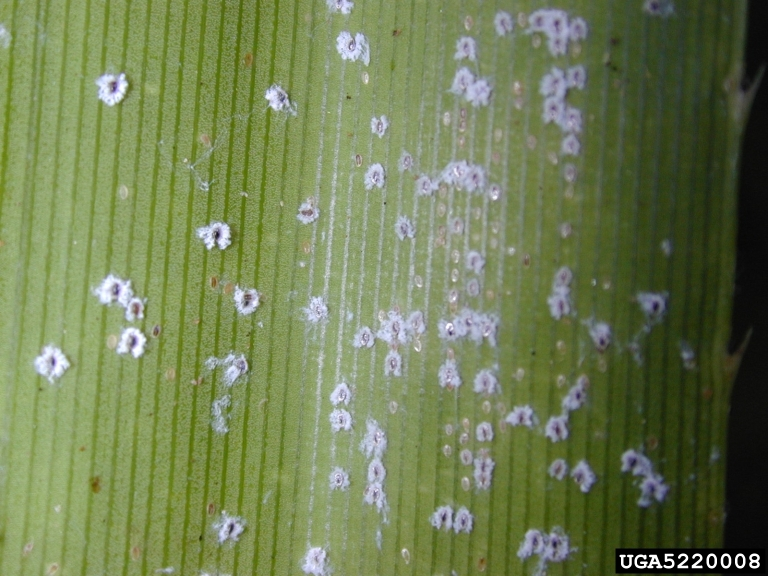
- Thysanococcus pandani on Pandanus tectorius

Scientific classification
- Kingdom: Animalia
- Phylum: Arthropoda
- Clade: Pancrustacea
- Class: Insecta
- Order: Hemiptera
- Suborder: Sternorrhyncha
- Infraorder: Coccomorpha
- Superfamily: Coccoidea
- Family: Halimococcidae

Genera
- See text

= Halimococcidae =

Family of true bugs

Halimococcidae is a family of scale insects in the order Hemiptera. Members of the family are commonly known as pupillarial palm scales or halimococcids. Most species are found on the leaves of palm trees where they suck sap, but some species occur on Pandanus. The family was named by Brown and McKenzie in 1962 and includes six known genera and twenty two species.

== Morphology ==
The body of the palm scale is normally dark brown or black and pyramid-shaped, although some species are circular or elliptical. The body is flattened ventrally and is dorsally convex, with the posterior end being constricted with a protruding operculum. The female remains inside the second instar while producing a hardened test. The exuviae then rupture ventrally and disintegrate, often leaving portions behind which become incorporated into the test. Most palm scale species do not secrete wax but some species have lateral, filamentous strands.

== Life cycle ==
Female palm scales have three instars while males normally have five. All species have a hardened test and it is believed that they all lay eggs. The crawlers emerge from the test through the anal opening at the back and disperse. The male develops further within the shed skin of the second instar, having a prepupal and then a pupal stage. There are believed to be several generations of palm scale each year and the female is thought to produce fewer than ten eggs.

== Genera ==
- Colobopyga
- Comstockiella
- Halimococcus
- Madhalimococcus
- Platycoccus
- Thysanococcus
