= Nikolai Borchsenius =

Russian entomologist

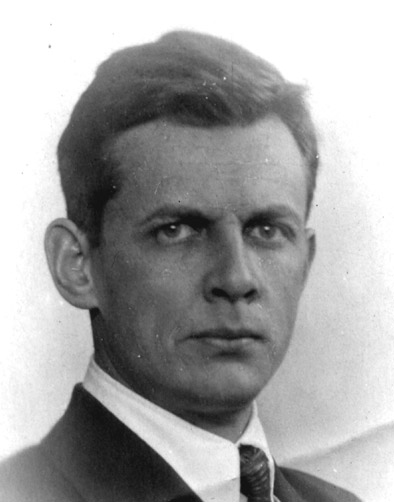
Nikolai Sergeevich Borchsenius in 1935

Nikolai Sergeevich Borchsenius (Russian: Николай Сергеевич Борхсениус; 20 October 1906 Saint Petersburg - 5 May 1965, Leningrad) was a Russian entomologist who specialised in the Coccoidea.

== Selected publications ==
- 1949 Identification of the soft and armored scales of Armenia. (In Russian.) Proceedings of the Armenian SSR Academy of Sciences 1949: 1-271.
- 1950. Mealybugs and scale insects of the USSR (Coccoidea). (In Russian.) Zoological Institute, USSR Academy of Sciences, Moscow, Russia. 250 pp.
- 1965. Essay on the classification of the armoured scale insects (Homoptera, Coccoidea, Diaspididae). (In Russian.) Энтомологическое обозрение (Entomological Review) 44: 208-214.

== Collection ==
Borchsenius' collection is in the Quarantine-Laboratorium of the Zoological Institute of the Russian Academy of Sciences in Saint Petersburg.
