= Phoenicococcidae =

Scientific classification
- Domain: Eukaryota
- Kingdom: Animalia
- Phylum: Arthropoda
- Class: Insecta
- Order: Hemiptera
- Suborder: Sternorrhyncha
- Infraorder: Coccomorpha
- Superfamily: Coccoidea
- Family: Phoenicococcidae; Stickney, 1934

Genera
- See text

Family of true bugs

Phoenicococcidae is a family of scale insects commonly known as palm scales or phoenicococcids. There is a single genus containing one species, Phoenicococcus marlatti.

== Hosts ==
Palms in the genus Phoenix are the main host for Phoenicococcus marlatti but occasionally it has been found infesting other palms. It is widely distributed in areas where palms grow but it is likely that it is native to north Africa.

== Description ==
Adult phoenicococcids are nearly circular, up to 1.5 millimetres long and a dark red colour. They are usually found embedded in a white waxy nest at the base of palm fronds. They have no legs and the antennae have a single segment.

== Life cycle ==
There are three instars in the female and five in the male phoenicococcid. There are many overlapping generations with scales of all ages being present at any time of year. Development takes about sixty days in warm conditions but is much slower with cooler conditions.
