= Carayonemidae =

Scientific classification
- Domain: Eukaryota
- Kingdom: Animalia
- Phylum: Arthropoda
- Class: Insecta
- Order: Hemiptera
- Suborder: Sternorrhyncha
- Infraorder: Coccomorpha
- Superfamily: Coccoidea
- Family: Carayonemidae; Richard, 1986

Genera
- See text

Family of true bugs

Carayonemidae is a family of scale insects commonly known as carayonemids. They typically live among mosses and leaf litter which is unusual for scale insects. Members of this family come from Neotropical areas of South and Central America.

However, per Scalenet, using morphology, Powell et al. (2024) demonstrates that the four species previously placed in the family Carayonemidae form a monophyletic group within the Ortheziidae, as the subfamily Carayoneminae.

== Life cycle ==
Very little is known about this family, but in one species, the female scale has four instars.

== Genera ==
There are four genera, each with a single known species:

- Baloghicoccus costaricaensis
- Carayonema orousseti
- Foldicoccus monikae
- Mahunkacoccus mexicoensis

Foldicoccus monikae is flattened and leaf-shaped and the adult has six legs and a pair of antennae.
