= Phenacoleachiidae =

Scientific classification
- Kingdom: Animalia
- Phylum: Arthropoda
- Clade: Pancrustacea
- Class: Insecta
- Order: Hemiptera
- Suborder: Sternorrhyncha
- Superfamily: Coccoidea
- Family: Phenacoleachiidae; Cockerell, 1902

Genera
- See text

Family of true bugs

Phenacoleachiidae is a family of scale insects commonly known as the phenacoleachiids. They are found only in the South Island of New Zealand, and on certain offshore islands. There are two species in a single genus.

== Hosts ==
Phenacoleachia zealandica is found on southern beech trees and Phenacoleachia australis is found on Pleurophyllum species, daisy-like plants in the family Asteraceae.

== Description ==
The adult females phenacoleachiids are brownish-red and dusted with a white mealy powder and covered with a cottony wax. There are some coarse yellow curly threads and some short lateral filaments on the rear half of the abdomen. They have short legs and resemble mealybugs in appearance but are believed to be more closely related to the primitive ortheziids and margarodoids than to the higher scale families such as the pseudococcids. The adult males are reddish-yellow, large than the females and covered with white mealy wax. They have two lateral filaments. The first instars are yellowish-red covered with the same white mealy wax.

== Life cycle ==
Little is known of the life history of this family of scale insects.

== Genera ==
- Phenacoleachia zealandica (Maskell)
- Phenacoleachia australis (Beardsley)
