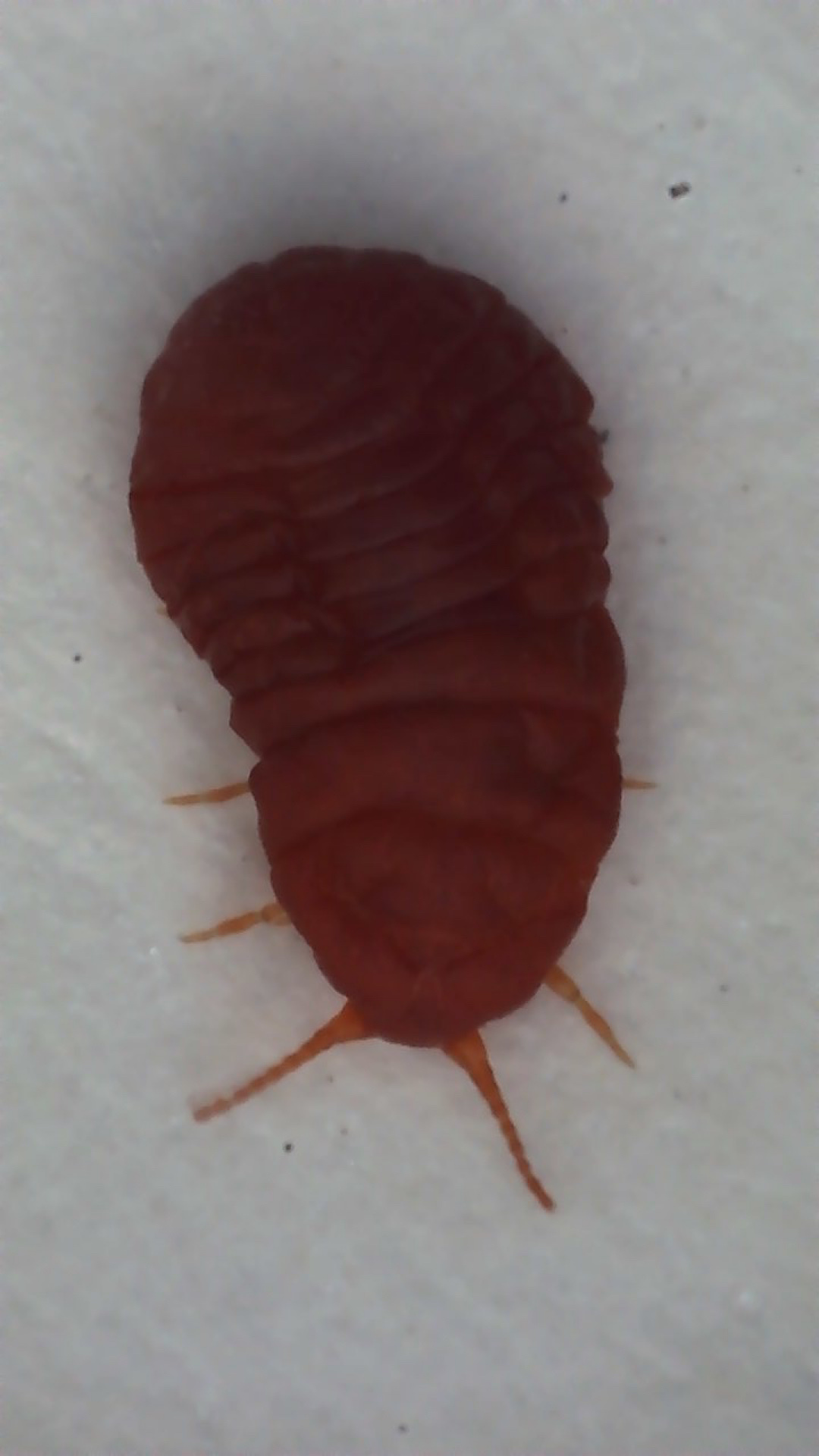
- Neosteingelia texana nymph

Scientific classification
- Kingdom: Animalia
- Phylum: Arthropoda
- Clade: Pancrustacea
- Class: Insecta
- Order: Hemiptera
- Suborder: Sternorrhyncha
- Infraorder: Coccomorpha
- Superfamily: Coccoidea
- Family: Kuwaniidae; MacGillvray 1921

= Kuwaniidae =

Family of true bugs

Kuwaniidae is a family of scales and mealybugs in the order Hemiptera. There are at least four genera and about 14 described species in Kuwaniidae.

== Genera ==
These four genera belong to the family Kuwaniidae:

- Kuwania Cockerell, 1903
- Neogreenia MacGillivray, 1921
- Neosteingelia Morrison, 1927
- † Hoffeinsia Koteja, 2008
