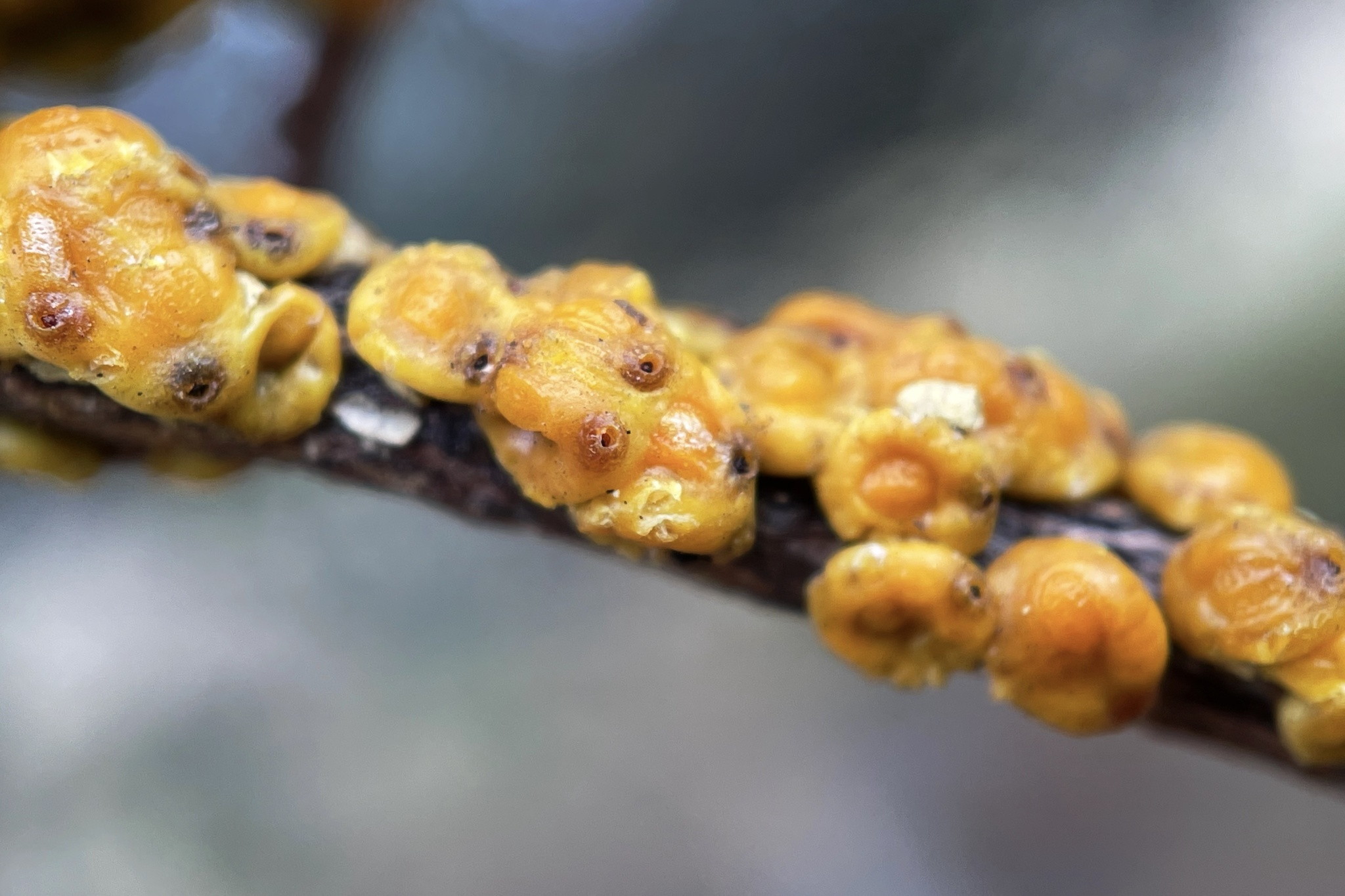
- Tests made by Cerococcus quercus

Scientific classification
- Domain: Eukaryota
- Kingdom: Animalia
- Phylum: Arthropoda
- Class: Insecta
- Order: Hemiptera
- Suborder: Sternorrhyncha
- Superfamily: Coccoidea
- Family: Cerococcidae; Balachowsky, 1942

Genera
- See text

= Cerococcidae =

Family of true bugs

Cerococcidae is a family of scale insects commonly known as ornate pit scales or cerococcids. There are 83 species in 5 genera. Members of this family occur in all regions of the world.

== Description ==
Adult females produce a protective waxy test that shields their body. The tests are mostly creamy or varying shades of brown but some species have orange, yellow, red, pink or white. Male tests are smaller and narrower than those of the females and are developed in the second instar. Species in the genera Asterococcus and Solenophora incorporate the shed skin of the first instar in their test. The second instar females are believed to develop tests in these genera but in Cerococcus it is the third instars that do so.

== Life cycle ==
Ornate pit scales have three instar stages in the females and five in the males. In the United States, where a few species of Cerococcus have been studied, there is a single generation each year and the eggs overwinter inside the female test. They hatch in the spring and emerge through a small hole at the back. These first instars are ambulatory and disperse around the host plant. Second instars appear early in the summer and adults towards the end of summer, with egg-laying taking place in the autumn. Males occur in most species.

== Genera ==
- Antecerococcus 56 species
- Asterococcus 9 species
- Cerochiton 3 species
- Cerococcus 62 species
- Solenophora 1 species
