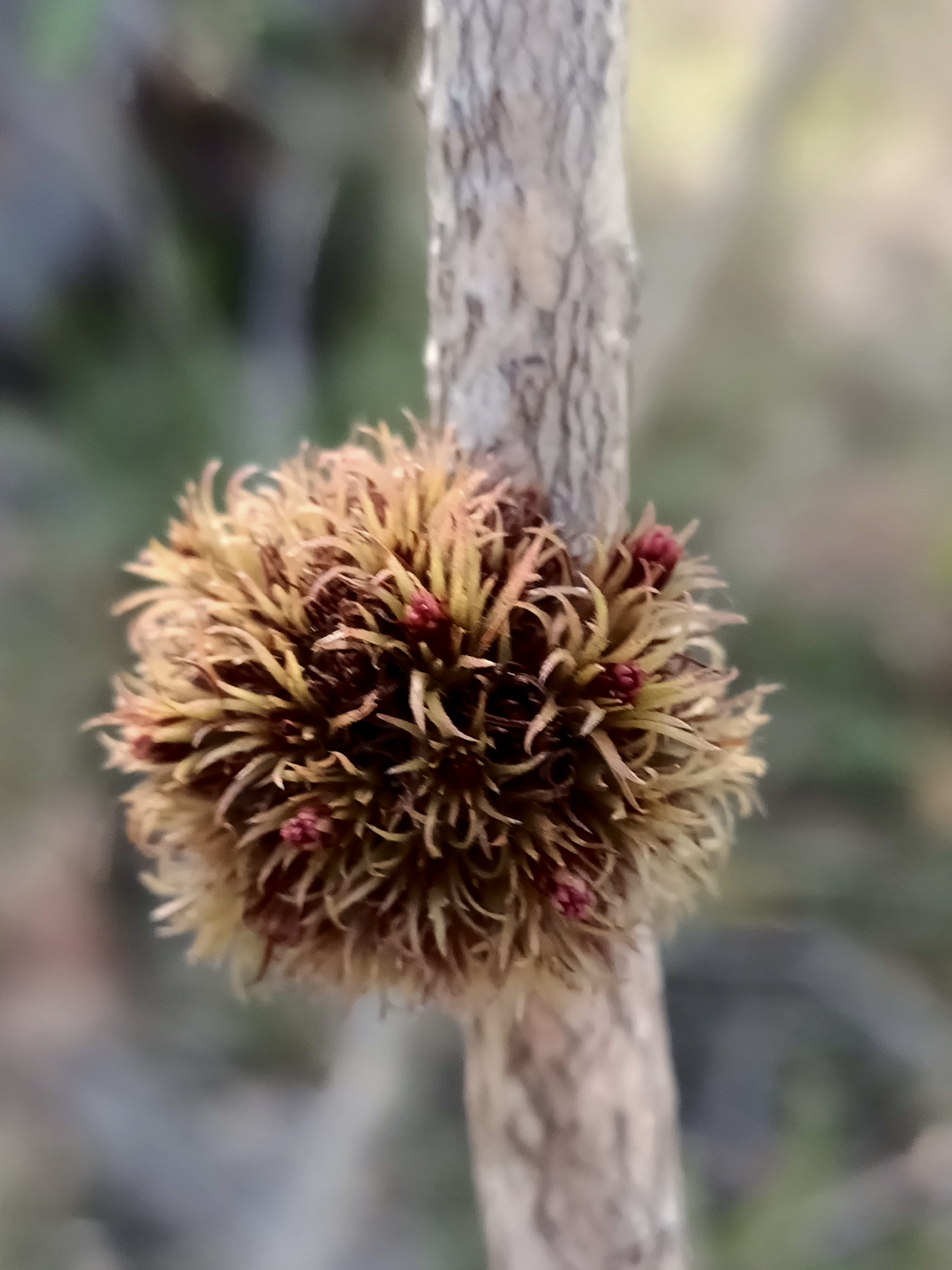
- Gall of a Beesoniidae

Scientific classification
- Domain: Eukaryota
- Kingdom: Animalia
- Phylum: Arthropoda
- Class: Insecta
- Order: Hemiptera
- Suborder: Sternorrhyncha
- Infraorder: Coccomorpha
- Superfamily: Coccoidea
- Family: Beesoniidae; Ferris, 1950

Genera
- See text

= Beesoniidae =

Family of insects

Beesoniidae is a family of scale insects commonly known as beesoniids. They typically cause galls on their plant hosts. Members of this family mostly come from southern Asia. The family name comes from the type genus Beesonia which is named after the entomologist C.F.C. Beeson who obtained the specimens from which they were described and named.

== Host species ==
In the Old World, this members of this family are found on oaks in the genus Quercus and trees in the genera Shorea and Dipterocarpus in the family Dipterocarpaceae. The New World species target palms (Arecaceae).

The Australian Beesonia ferrugineus forms galls on branches of Melaleuca (Myrtaceae). However, the genus and family placement of B. ferrugineus has been questioned.

== Life cycle ==
Most scales in this family have four female instars and five male instars. Members of the genus Gallacoccus have only three female instars however.

The females form galls which are often quite ornate. In some species the first instars seem to act as soldiers and attempt to guard the gall. Males appear to develop inside the female galls, and adult males may carry the first-instar females to new host plants (phoresis).

== Genera ==
- Beesonia Green, 1926
- Danumococcus
- Echinogalla
- Gallacoccus
- Limacoccus
- Mangalorea
