= Stigmacoccus =

Scientific classification
- Domain: Eukaryota
- Kingdom: Animalia
- Phylum: Arthropoda
- Class: Insecta
- Order: Hemiptera
- Suborder: Sternorrhyncha
- Family: Stigmacoccidae
- Genus: Stigmacoccus; Hempel 1900

Genus of true bugs

Stigmacoccus is a genus of scales and mealybugs in the family Stigmacoccidae. There are at least three described species in Stigmacoccus.

== Species ==
These three species belong to the genus Stigmacoccus:

- Stigmacoccus asper Hempel, 1900 (found in Brazil)
- Stigmacoccus garmilleri Foldi, 1995 (found in Mexico)
- Stigmacoccus paranaensis Foldi (found in Brazil)
