= Aclerdidae =

Scientific classification
- Kingdom: Animalia
- Phylum: Arthropoda
- Class: Insecta
- Order: Hemiptera
- Suborder: Sternorrhyncha
- Superfamily: Coccoidea
- Family: Aclerdidae; Ferris, 1937

Family of true bugs

Aclerdidae are a family of Coccoidea, the scale insects. They are usually found on grasses, sucking sap from the stem, inside the leaf sheaths.

== Genera ==
- Aclerda Signoret, 1874
- Kwazulaclerda Hodgson & Millar, 2002
- Lecanaclerda Hodgson & Millar, 2002
- Nipponaclerda McConnell, 1954
- Novmamilla Jian & Xing, 2022
- Rhodesaclerda McConnell, 1954
