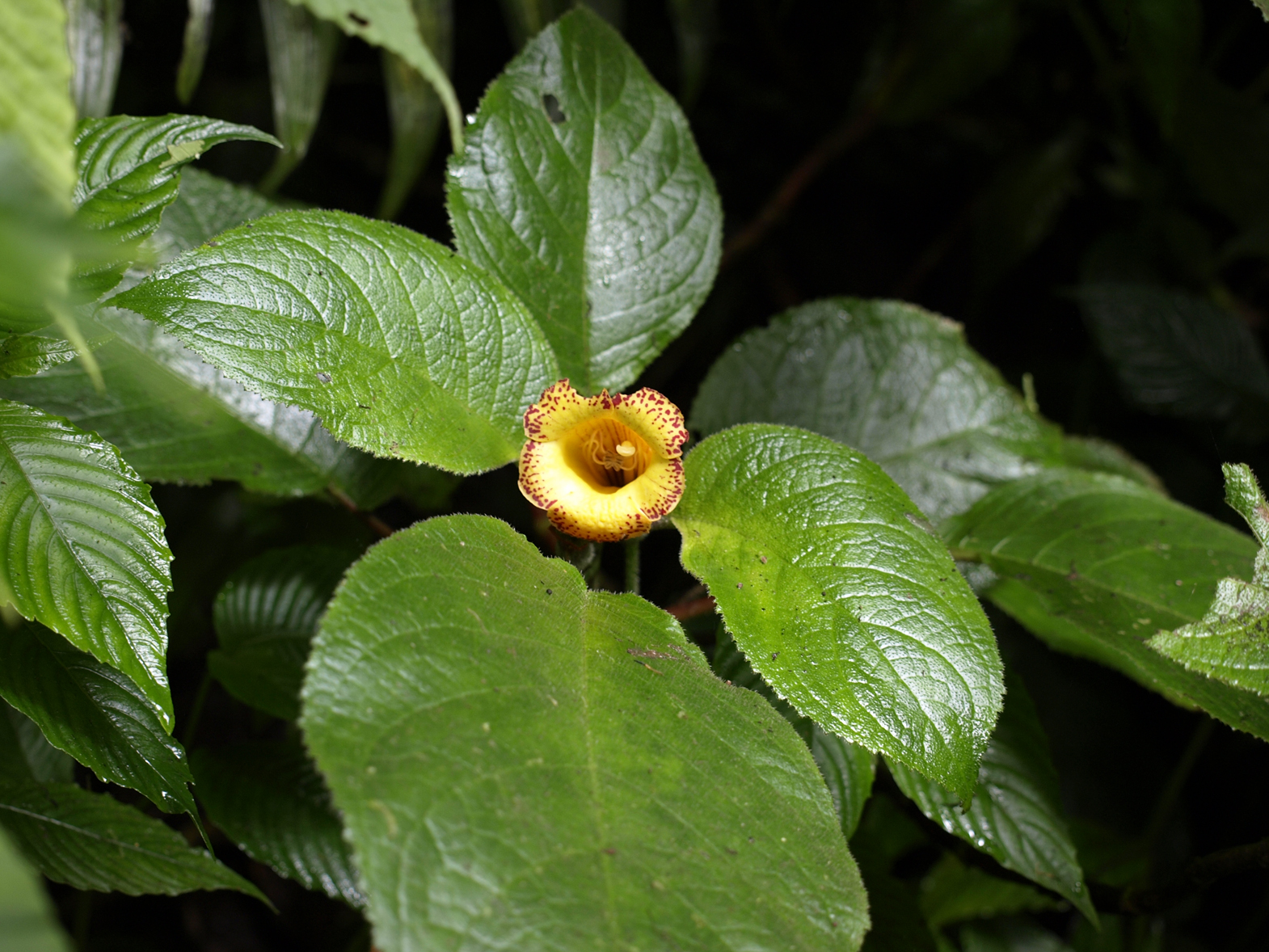
- Solenophora calycosa

Scientific classification
- Kingdom: Plantae
- Clade: Embryophytes
- Clade: Tracheophytes
- Clade: Angiosperms
- Clade: Eudicots
- Clade: Asterids
- Order: Lamiales
- Family: Gesneriaceae
- Subfamily: Gesnerioideae
- Genus: Solenophora; Benth.

Species
- See text

Synonyms
- Arctocalyx Fenzl; Hippodamia Decne.

= Solenophora =

Genus of flowering plants

Solenophora is a genus of flowering plants in the family Gesneriaceae, native to Central America and southern Mexico. Most of its species have limited, local distributions, but Solenophora calycosa is widespread.

== Species ==
Currently accepted species include:

- Solenophora abietorum Standl. & Steyerm.
- Solenophora calycosa Donn.Sm.
- Solenophora chiapasensis D.N.Gibson
- Solenophora coccinea Benth.
- Solenophora endlicheriana (C.Heller ex Fenzl) Hanst.
- Solenophora erubescens Donn.Sm.
- Solenophora glomerata Weigend & Förther
- Solenophora insignis (M.Martens & Galeotti) Hanst.
- Solenophora maculata D.N.Gibson
- Solenophora modesta Weigend & Förther
- Solenophora obliqua Denham & D.N.Gibson
- Solenophora obscura Hanst.
- Solenophora pirana C.V.Morton
- Solenophora purpusii Brandegee
- Solenophora schleehaufii Weigend & Förther
- Solenophora tuerckheimiana Donn.Sm.
- Solenophora tuxtlensis Ram.-Roa & Ibarra-Manr.
- Solenophora wilsonii Standl.
