= Pityococcidae =

Scientific classification
- Kingdom: Animalia
- Phylum: Arthropoda
- Clade: Pancrustacea
- Class: Insecta
- Order: Hemiptera
- Suborder: Sternorrhyncha
- Infraorder: Coccomorpha
- Superfamily: Coccoidea
- Family: Pityococcidae; McKenzie 1942

Family of true bugs

Pityococcidae is a family of scales and mealybugs in the order Hemiptera.

== Genera ==
These genera belong to the family Pityococcidae:

- Pityococcus McKenzie, 1942
- † Cancerococcus Koteja, 1988
