= Steingeliidae =

Scientific classification
- Domain: Eukaryota
- Kingdom: Animalia
- Phylum: Arthropoda
- Class: Insecta
- Order: Hemiptera
- Suborder: Sternorrhyncha
- Infraorder: Coccomorpha
- Superfamily: Coccoidea
- Family: Steingeliidae; Morrison, 1927

Family of true bugs

Steingeliidae is a family of scales and mealybugs in the order Hemiptera. There are about 5 genera and 10 described species in Steingeliidae.

== Genera ==
These five genera belong to the family Steingeliidae:

- Araucaricoccus Brimblecombe, 1960
- Conifericoccus Brimblecombe, 1960
- Steingelia Nasonov, 1908
- Stomacoccus Ferris, 1917
- † Palaeosteingelia Koteja & Azar, 2008
