= Funchalia =

Scientific classification
- Domain: Eukaryota
- Kingdom: Animalia
- Phylum: Arthropoda
- Class: Malacostraca
- Order: Decapoda
- Suborder: Dendrobranchiata
- Family: Penaeidae
- Genus: Funchalia; J. Y. Johnson, 1868

Synonyms
- Hemipenaeopsis Bouvier, 1905; Grimaldiella Bouvier, 1905

Genus of crustaceans

Funchalia is a genus of deep-water prawns of the family Penaeidae. Six species are currently recognised:

- Funchalia danae Burkenroad, 1940
- Funchalia meridionalis (Lenz & Strunck, 1914)
- Funchalia sagamiensis Fujino, 1975
- Funchalia taaningi Burkenroad, 1940
- Funchalia villosa (Bouvier, 1905)
- Funchalia woodwardi Johnson, 1868

Few specimens of Funchalia are present in museum collections, mostly due to the lack of sampling at the great depths where it lives. It probably has a cosmopolitan distribution.

The genus was erected in 1868, when James Yate Johnson erected it for the species Funchalia woodwardi, which he had collected off Madeira; the specific epithet commemorated Henry Woodward of the British Museum.
