= Journal of Systematic Palaeontology =

Scientific journal

- Discipline: Palaeontology, systematics
- Language: English

Publication details
- Former names: Bulletin of the Natural History Museum. Geology series; Bulletin of the British Museum (Natural History). Geology
- History: 1949–present
- Publisher: Taylor & Francis on behalf of the Natural History Museum, London

Standard abbreviations
- ISO 4: J. Syst. Palaeontol.

Indexing
- ISSN: 1477-2019 (print); 1478-0941 (web)

Links
- Journal homepage

The Journal of Systematic Palaeontology is a peer-reviewed scientific journal of palaeontology published by Taylor & Francis on behalf of the British Natural History Museum. As of 2009, the editor-in-chief is Paul D. Taylor.

The journal primarily covers papers on new and impactful systematic results in rigorous analyses of functional morphology, evolution, palaeoecology and more. It was established in 2003. According to the Journal Citation Reports, the journal has a 2014 impact factor of 3.727, ranking it second out of 49 journals in the category 'Paleontology'.
