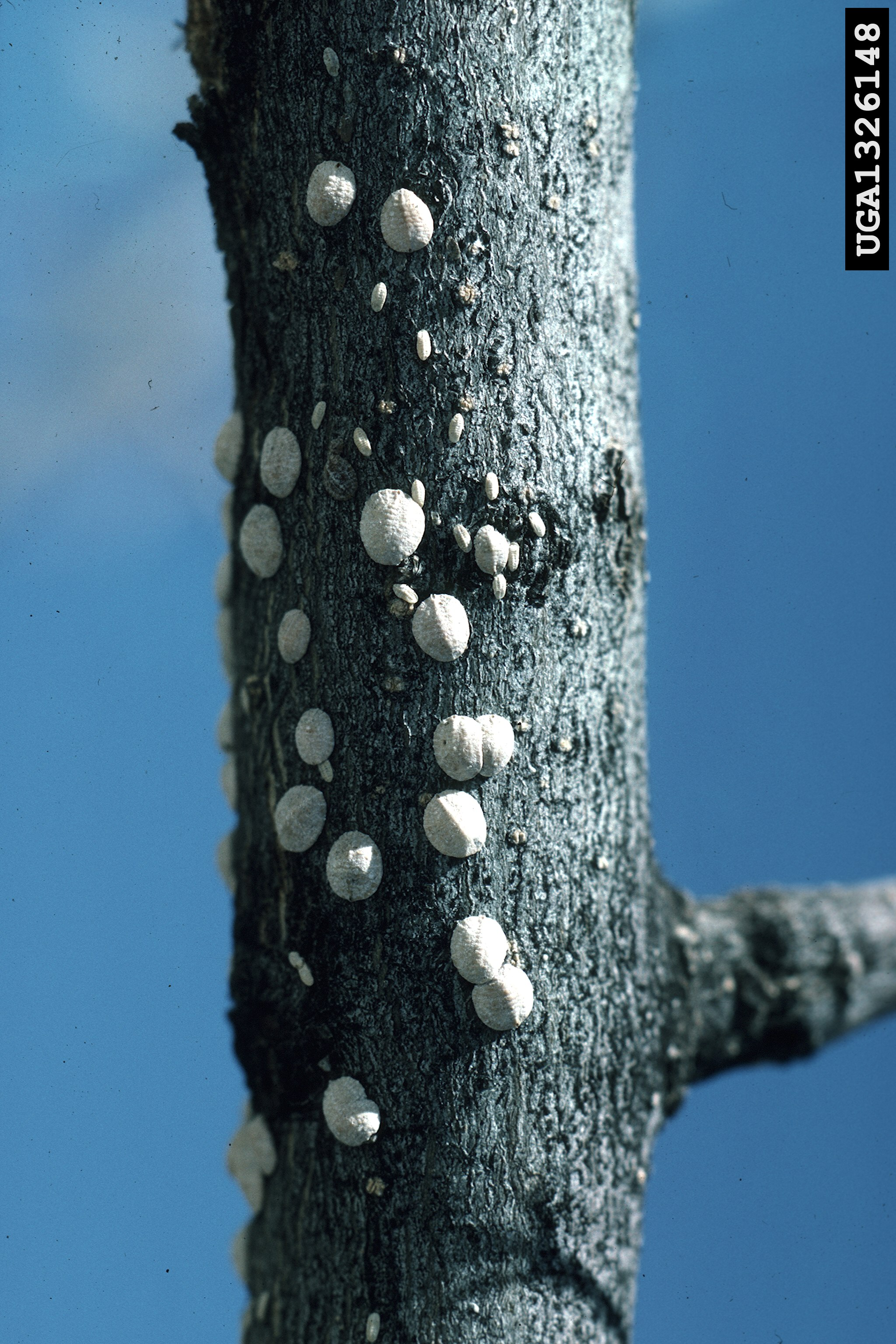
- Lecanodiaspis prosopidis on green ash branch.

Scientific classification
- Domain: Eukaryota
- Kingdom: Animalia
- Phylum: Arthropoda
- Class: Insecta
- Order: Hemiptera
- Suborder: Sternorrhyncha
- Infraorder: Coccomorpha
- Superfamily: Coccoidea
- Family: Lecanodiaspididae; Borchsenius (1965)

Genera
- See text

= Lecanodiaspididae =

Family of true bugs

Lecanodiaspididae is a family of scale insects commonly known as false pit scales or lecanodiaspidids. Members of this family come from all parts of the world but are most numerous in the Far East.

== Description ==
Adults false pit scales are yellow to reddish-brown and have a waxy, papery test with about eight transverse ridges giving it a corrugated appearance. There is a longitudinal ridge in the center of the test and an anal opening with rolled up edges at the posterior end.

== Life cycle ==
Members of this family of scales mostly live on the trunks and branches of shrubs and deciduous trees. Host plants include species from 67 plant families but false pit scales predominantly occur on Fabaceae. They are also found, but less often, on Fagaceae, Moraceae, Myrtaceae and Rutaceae. The females develop through three instar stages and the males through five. There is usually a single generation per year and the scales overwinter as eggs under the mother's test. Males exist in most of the species. Many of the species are guarded by ants which are attracted by their honeydew.

== Genera ==
- Anomalococcus
- Brookesiella
- Celaticoccus
- Cosmococcus
- Cresococcus
- Gallinococcus
- Lecanodiaspis
- Prosopophora
- Psoraleococcus
- Pterococcus
- Stictacanthus
- Virgulicoccus
