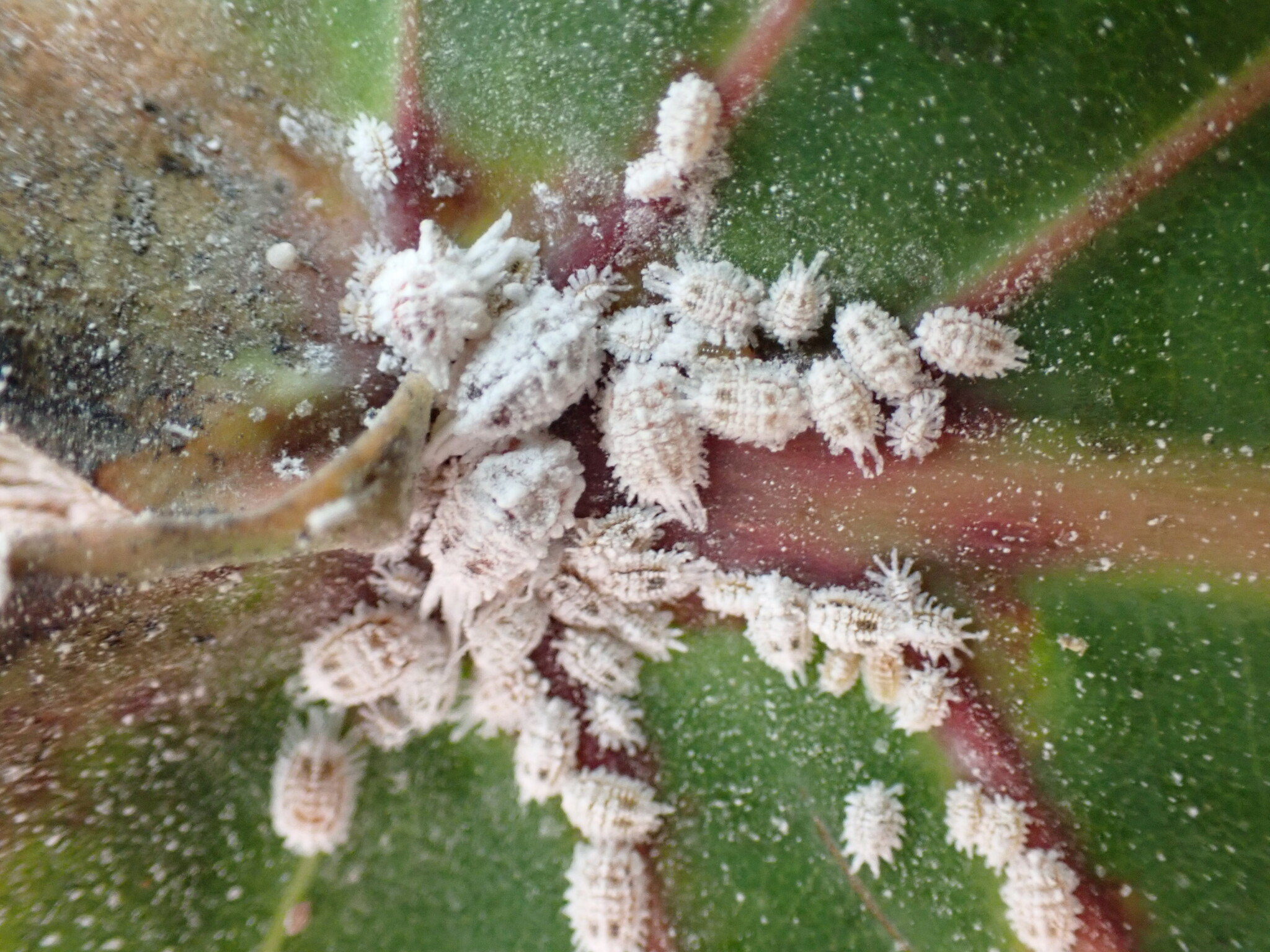
- Puto barberi

Scientific classification
- Kingdom: Animalia
- Phylum: Arthropoda
- Class: Insecta
- Order: Hemiptera
- Suborder: Sternorrhyncha
- Superfamily: Coccoidea
- Family: Putoidae; Beardsley, 1969

Genera and subgenera
- Puto: Puto subgenus Ceroputo Šulc, 1897; Puto subgenus Puto Signoret, 1875; †Palaeotupo Koteja & Azar, 2008

= Putoidae =

Family of true bugs

Putoidae is a family of scale insects commonly known as giant mealybugs or putoids The genus name Macrocerococcus has also been used but it is now considered to be a synonym of Puto. The genus Puto was formerly classified as a member of the Pseudococcidae; however, it so significantly differed from the rest of the Pseudococcidae that it was accorded its own family Putoidae.
