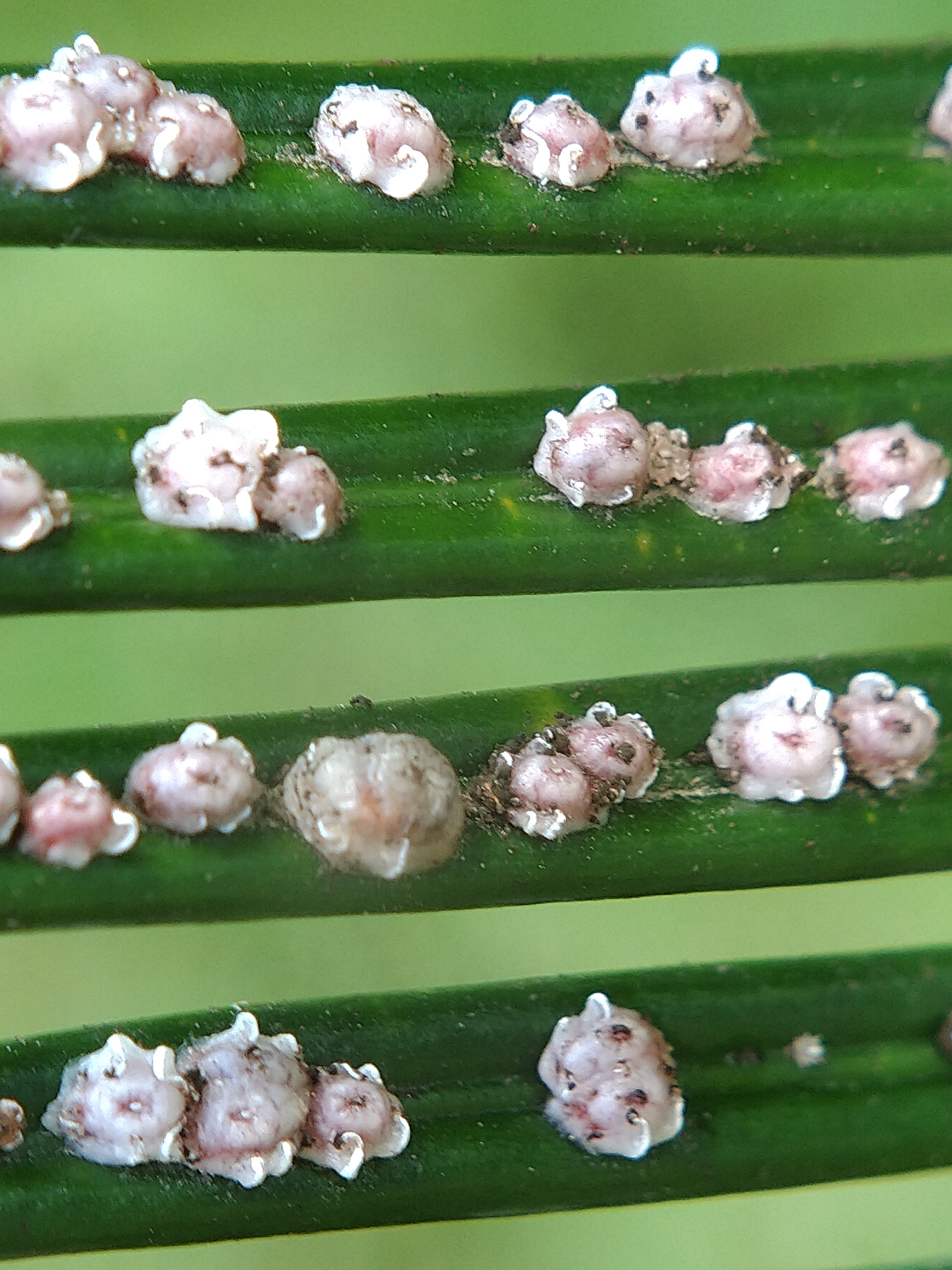
- Waxy scales on cycad leaf

Scientific classification
- Kingdom: Animalia
- Phylum: Arthropoda
- Clade: Pancrustacea
- Class: Insecta
- Order: Hemiptera
- Suborder: Sternorrhyncha
- Infraorder: Coccomorpha; Heslop-Harrison, 1952
- Superfamily: Coccoidea; Handlirsch, 1903

Families
- See text

= Scale insect =

Scale insect Temporal range: Late Jurassic – Recent

Superfamily of insects

Scale insects are small insects of the order Hemiptera, suborder Sternorrhyncha. Of dramatically variable appearance and extreme sexual dimorphism, they comprise the infraorder Coccomorpha which is considered a more convenient grouping than the superfamily Coccoidea due to taxonomic uncertainties. Adult females typically have soft bodies and no limbs, and are concealed underneath domed scales, extruding quantities of wax for protection. Some species are hermaphroditic, with a combined ovotestis instead of separate ovaries and testes. Males, in the species where they occur, have legs and sometimes wings, and resemble small flies. Scale insects are herbivores, piercing plant tissues with their mouthparts and remaining in one place, feeding on sap. The excess fluid they imbibe is secreted as honeydew on which sooty mold tends to grow. The insects often have a mutualistic relationship with ants, which feed on the honeydew and protect them from predators. There are about 8,000 described species.

The oldest fossils of the group date to the Late Jurassic, preserved in amber. They were already substantially diversified by the Early Cretaceous suggesting an earlier origin during the Triassic or Jurassic. Their closest relatives are the jumping plant lice, whiteflies, phylloxera bugs and aphids. The majority of female scale insects remain in one place as adults, with newly hatched nymphs, known as "crawlers", being the only mobile life stage, apart from the short-lived males. The reproductive strategies of many species include at least some amount of asexual reproduction by parthenogenesis.

Some scale insects are serious commercial pests, notably the cottony cushion scale (Icerya purchasi) on Citrus fruit trees; they are difficult to control as the scale and waxy covering protect them effectively from contact insecticides. Some species are used for biological control of pest plants such as the prickly pear, Opuntia. Others produce commercially valuable substances including carmine and kermes dyes, and shellac lacquer. The two red colour-names crimson and scarlet both derive from the names of Kermes products in other languages.

== Description ==
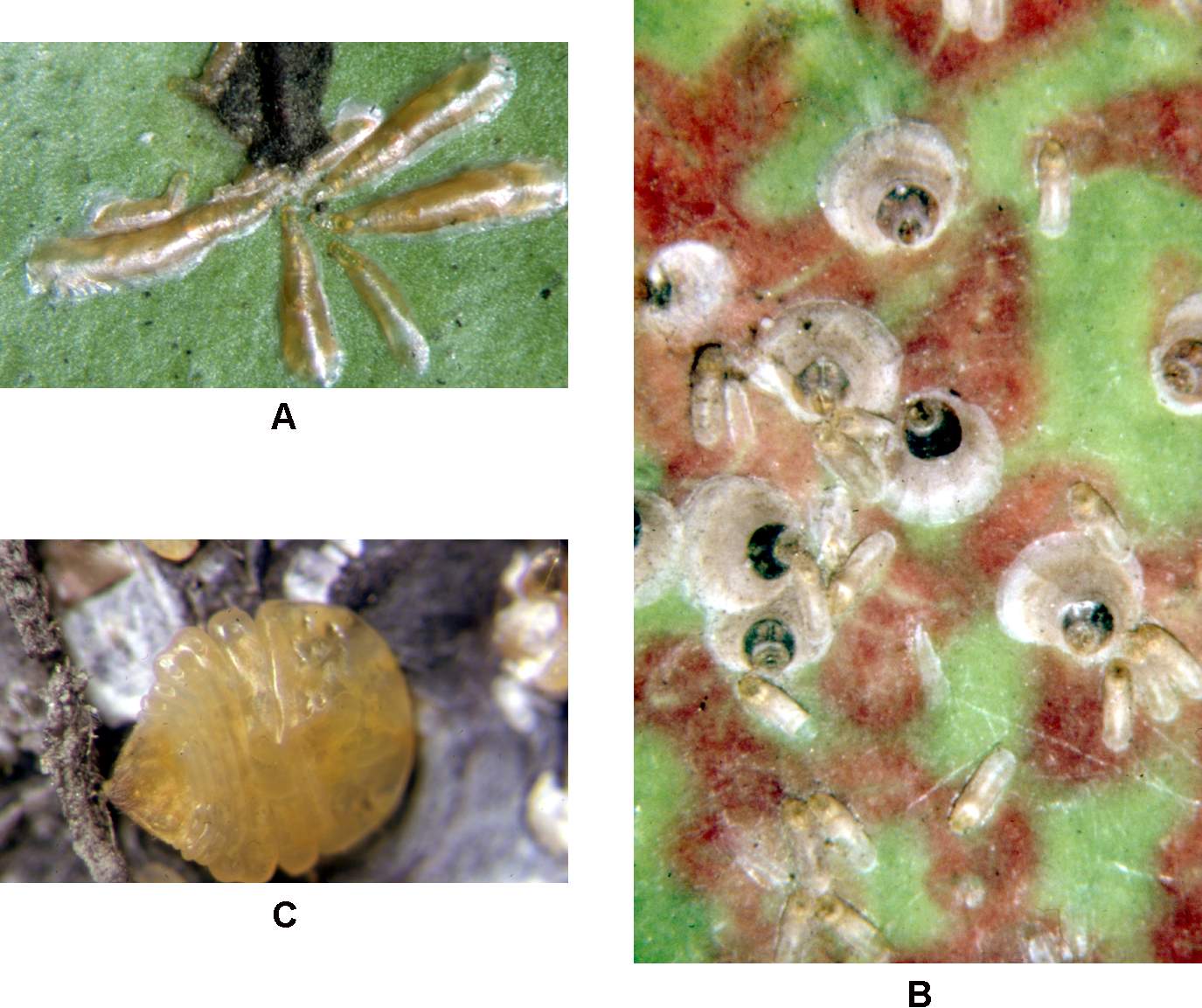
Armoured scale insects:(A) Lepidosaphes gloverii, adult females. (B) Parlatoria oleae, adult females (circular, with dark spot) and immatures (oblong). (C) Diaspidiotus juglansregiae, adult female walnut scale with waxy scale cover removed.

Scale insects vary dramatically in appearance, from very small organisms (1–2 mm) that grow beneath wax covers (some shaped like oysters, others like mussel shells), to shiny pearl-like objects (about 5 mm), to animals covered with mealy wax. Adult females are almost always immobile (apart from mealybugs) and permanently attached to the plant on which they are feeding. They secrete a waxy coating for defence, making them resemble reptilian or fish scales, and giving them their common name. The key character that sets apart the Coccomorpha from all other Hemiptera is the single segmented tarsus on the legs with only one claw at the tip.

The group is extremely sexually dimorphic; female scale insects, unusual for Hemiptera, retain the immature external morphology even when sexually mature, a condition known as neoteny. Adult females are pear-shaped, elliptical or circular, with no wings, and usually no constriction separating the head from the body. Segmentation of the body is indistinct, but may be indicated by the presence of marginal bristles. Legs are absent in the females of some families, and when present vary from single segment stubs to five-segmented limbs. Female scale insects have no compound eyes, but ocelli (simple eyes) are sometimes present in Margarodidae, Ortheziidae and Phenacoleachiidae. The family Beesoniidae lacks antennae, but other families possess antennae with from one to 13 segments. The mouthparts are adapted for piercing and sucking.

Adult males in contrast have the typical head, thorax and abdomen of other insect groups, and are so different from females that pairing them as a species is challenging. They are usually slender insects resembling aphids or small flies. They have antennae with nine or ten segments, compound eyes (Margarodidae and Ortheziidae) or simple eyes (most other families), and legs with five segments. Most species have wings, and in some, generations may alternate between being winged and wingless. Adult males do not feed, and die within two or three days of emergence.

In species with winged males, generally only the forewings are fully functional. This is unusual among insects; it most closely resembles the situation in the true flies, the Diptera. However, the Diptera and Hemiptera are not closely related, and do not closely resemble each other in morphology; for example, the tail filaments of the Coccomorpha do not resemble anything in the morphology of flies. The hind (metathoracic) wings are reduced, commonly to the point that they can easily be overlooked. In some species the hind wings have hamuli, hooklets, that couple the hind wings to the main wings, as in the Hymenoptera. The vestigial wings are often reduced to pseudo-halteres, (Note: These are occasionally called "hamulohalteres" in reference to their hamuli.) club-like appendages, but these are not homologous with the control organs of Diptera that are called halteres, and it is not clear whether they have any substantial control function.

Hermaphroditism, rare in insects, occurs in genera like Icerya and Crypticerya. This enables self-fertilization. The adult possesses an ovotestis, consisting of both female and male reproductive tissue, and sperm is transmitted to the young for their future use. The fact that a new population can be founded by a single individual may have contributed to the success of the cottony cushion scale which has spread around the world. Androdioecy, where pure males occurs in an otherwise hermaphroditic form, has also been observed in Icerya.

== Life cycle ==
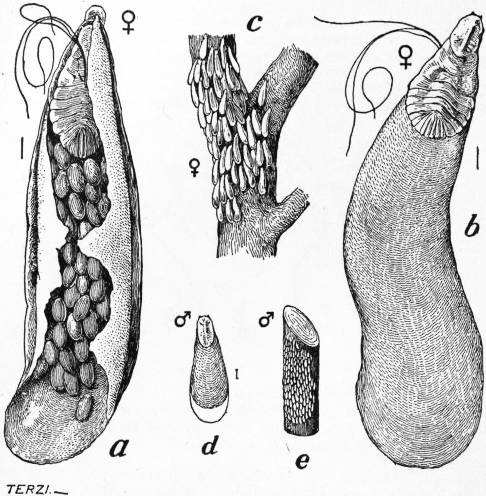
Life-cycle of the apple scale, Mytilaspis pomorum. a) underside of scale showing female and eggs, x24 b) scale upperside, x24 c) female scales on twig d) male scale, x12 e) male scales on twig

Female scale insects in more advanced families develop from the egg through a first instar (crawler) stage and a second instar stage before becoming adult. In more primitive families there is an additional instar stage. Males pass through a first and second instar stage, a pre-pupal and a pupal stage before adulthood (actually a pseudopupa, as only holometabolous insects have a true pupa).

The first instars of most species of scale insects emerge from the egg with functional legs, and are informally called "crawlers". They immediately crawl around in search of a suitable spot to settle down and feed. In some species they delay settling down either until they are starving, or until they have been blown away by wind onto what presumably is another plant, where they may establish a new colony. There are many variations on such themes, such as scale insects that are associated with species of ants that act as herders and carry the young ones to protected sites to feed. In either case, many such species of crawlers, when they moult, lose the use of their legs if they are female, and stay put for life. Only the males retain legs, and in some species wings, and use them in seeking females. To do this they usually walk, as their ability to fly is limited, but they may get carried to new locations by the wind.

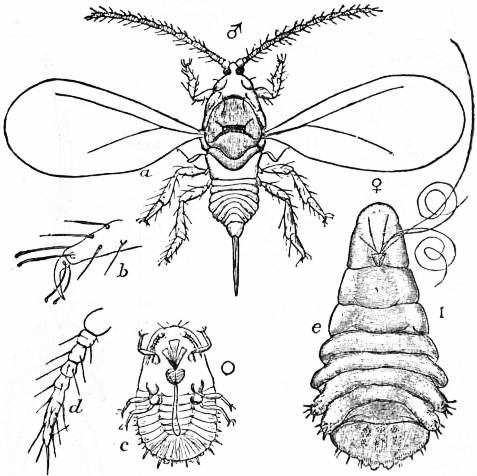
Apple scale. a) male, with legs and wings b) foot of male c) larva, x20 d) antenna of larva e) immobile female (removed from scale)

Adult females of the families Margarodidae, Ortheziidae and Pseudococcidae are mobile and can move to other parts of the host plant or even adjoining plants, but the mobile period is limited to a short period between moults. Some of these overwinter in crevices in the bark or among plant litter, moving in spring to tender young growth. However, the majority of female scale insects are sedentary as adults. Their dispersal ability depends on how far a crawler can crawl before it needs to shed its skin and start feeding. There are various strategies for dealing with deciduous trees. On these, males often feed on the leaves, usually beside the veins, while females select the twigs. Where there are several generations in the year, there may be a general retreat onto the twigs as fall approaches. On branches, the underside is usually preferred as giving protection against predation and adverse weather. The solenopsis mealybug feeds on the foliage of its host in summer and the roots in winter, and large numbers of scale species feed invisibly, year-round on roots.

=== Reproduction and the genetics of sex determination ===
Scale insects show a very wide range of variations in the genetics of sex determination and the modes of reproduction. Besides sexual reproduction, a number of different forms of reproductive systems are employed, including asexual reproduction by parthenogenesis. In some species, sexual and asexual populations are found in different locations, and in general, species with a wide geographic range and a diversity of plant hosts are more likely to be asexual. Large population size is hypothesized to protect an asexual population from becoming extinct, but nevertheless, parthenogenesis is uncommon among scale insects, with the most widespread generalist feeders reproducing sexually, the majority of these being pest species.

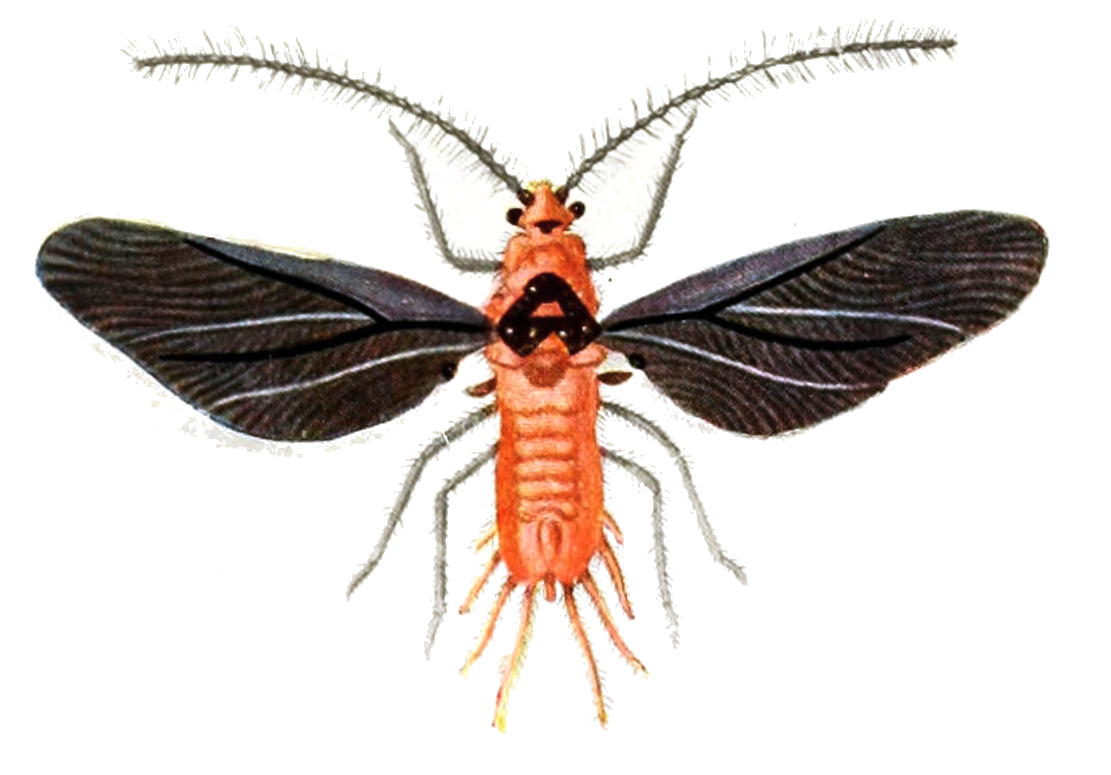
A winged male Drosicha sp

Many species have the XX-XO system where the female is diploid and homogametic while the male is heterogametic and missing a sex chromosome. In a clade that includes families like Diaspididae, Coccidae and Pseudococcidae, both sexes are produced from fertilized eggs, but during development males eliminate the paternal genome in a system called paternal genome elimination (PGE). This elimination is achieved with several variations. The commonest (known as the lecanoid system) involved deactivation of the paternal genome and elimination at the time of sperm production in males, this is seen in Pseudococcidae, Kerriidae and some Eriococcidae. In the other variant or Comstockiella system, the somatic cells have the paternal genome untouched. A third variant found in Diaspididae involves the paternal genome being completely removed at an early stage making males haploid both in somatic and germ cells even though they are formed from diploids, i.e., from fertilized eggs. In addition to this there is also true haplodiploidy with females born from fertilized eggs and males from unfertilized eggs. This is seen in the genus Icerya. In Parthenolecanium, males are born from unfertilized eggs but diploidy is briefly restored by fusion of haploid cleave nuclei and then one sex chromosome is lost through heterochromatinization. Females can reproduce parthenogenetically with six different variants based on whether males are entirely absent or not (obligate v. facultative parthenogenesis); the sex of fertilized v. unfertilized eggs; and based on how diploidy is restored in unfertilized eggs. The evolution of these systems are thought to be the result of intra-genomic conflict as well as possibly inter-genomic conflict with endosymbionts under varied selection pressures. The diversity of systems has made scale insects ideal models for research.

== Ecology ==
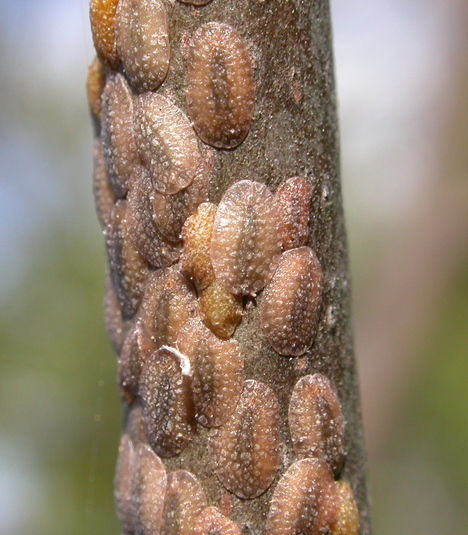
A cluster of scale insects on a stem

Scale insects are an ancient group, having originated in the Cretaceous, the period in which angiosperms came to dominance among plants, with only a few groups species found on gymnosperms. They feed on a wide variety of plants but are unable to survive long away from their hosts. While some specialise on a single plant species (monophagous), and some on a single genus or plant family (oligophagous), others are less specialised and feed on several plant groups (polyphagous). The parasite biologist Robert Poulin notes that the feeding behaviour of scale insects closely resembles that of ectoparasites, living on the outside of their host and feeding only on them, even if they have not traditionally been so described; in his view, those species that remain immobile on a single host and feed only on it behave as obligate ectoparasites. For example, cochineal species are restricted to cactus hosts, and the gall-inducing Apiomorpha are restricted to Eucalyptus. Some species have certain habitat requirements; some Ortheziidae occur in damp meadows, among mosses and in woodland soil, and the boreal ensign scale (Newsteadia floccosa) inhabits plant litter. A Hawaiian mealybug Clavicoccus erinaceus that fed solely on the now critically endangered Abutilon sandwicense has gone extinct as has another species Phyllococcus oahuensis. Several other monophagous scale insects, especially those on islands, are threatened by coextinction due to threats faced by their host plants.

Most scale insects are herbivores, feeding on phloem sap drawn directly from the plant's vascular system, but a few species feed on fungal mats and fungi, such as some species in the genus Newsteadia in the family Ortheziidae. Plant sap provides a liquid diet which is rich in sugar and non-essential amino acids. In order to make up for the shortage of essential amino acids, they depend on endosymbiotic proteobacteria. Scale insects secrete a large quantity of sticky viscid fluid known as "honeydew". This includes sugars, amino acids and minerals, and is attractive to ants as well as acting as a substrate on which sooty mould can grow. The mould can reduce photosynthesis by the leaves and detracts from the appearance of ornamental plants. The scale's activities can result in stress for the plant, causing reduced growth and giving it a greater susceptibility to plant diseases.

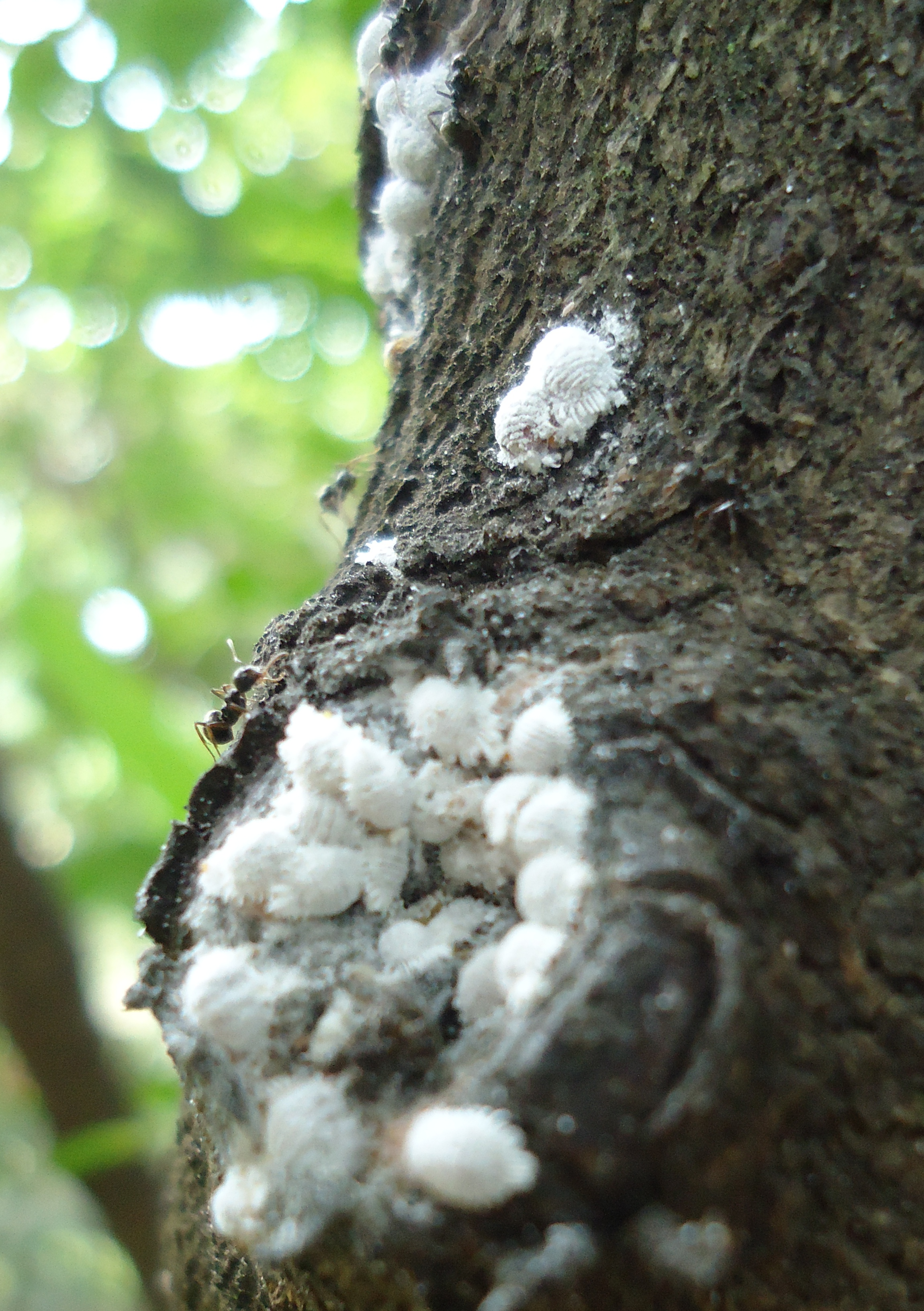
Mutualistic Formica fusca ants tending a herd of mealybugs

Scale insects in the genus Cryptostigma live inside the nests of neotropical ant species. Many tropical plants need ants to survive which in turn cultivate scale insects thus forming a tripartite symbiosis. Some ants and scale insects have a mutualistic relationship; the ants feed on the honeydew and in return protect the scales. On a tulip tree, ants have been observed building a papery tent over the scales. In other instances, scale insects are carried inside the ant's nest; the ant Acropyga exsanguis takes this to an extreme by transporting a fertilised female mealybug with it on its nuptial flight, so that the nest it founds can be provisioned. This provides a means for the mealybug to be dispersed widely. Species of Hippeococcus have long clinging legs with claws to grip the Dolichoderus ants which tend them; they allow themselves to be carried into the ant colony. Here the mealybugs are safe from predation and environmental hazards, while the ants have a source of nourishment. Another species of ant maintains a herd of scale insects inside the hollow stems of a Barteria tree; the scale insects feed on the sap and the ants, while benefiting from the honeydew, drive away other herbivorous insects from the tree as well as preventing vines from smothering it.

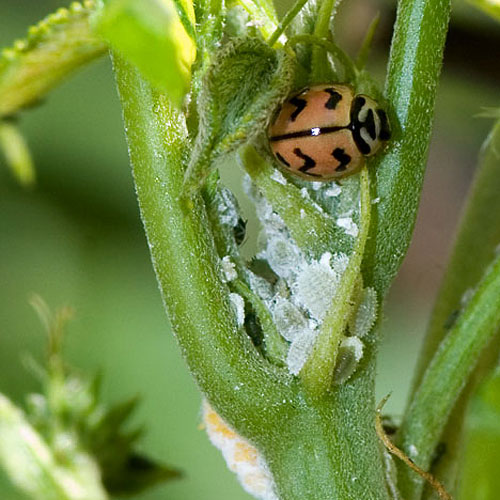
Cheilomenes sexmaculata preying on mealybugs

Scale insects have various natural enemies, and research in this field is largely directed at the species that are crop pests. Entomopathogenic fungi can attack suitable scales and completely overgrow them. The identity of the host is not always apparent as many fungi are host-specific, and may destroy all the scales of one species present on a leaf while not affecting another species. Fungi in the genus Septobasidium have a more complex, mutualistic relationship with scale insects. The fungus lives on trees where it forms a mat which overgrows the scales, reducing the growth of the individual parasitised scales and sometimes rendering them infertile, but protecting the scale colony from environmental conditions and predators. The fungus benefits by metabolising the sap extracted from the tree by the insects.

Natural enemies include parasitoid wasps, mostly in the families Encyrtidae and Eulophidae, and predatory beetles such as fungus weevils, ladybirds and sap beetles. Ladybirds feed on aphids and scale insects, laying their eggs near their prey to ensure their larvae have immediate access to food. The ladybird Cryptolaemus montrouzieri is known as the "mealybug destroyer" because both adults and larvae feed on mealybugs and some soft scales. Ants looking after their providers of honeydew tend to drive off predators, but the mealybug destroyer has outwitted the ants by developing cryptic camouflage, with their larvae mimicking scale larvae.

== Significance ==
=== As pests ===
Many scale species are serious crop pests and are particularly problematic for their ability to evade quarantine measures. In 1990, they caused around $5 billion of damage to crops in the United States. The waxy covering of many species of scale protects their adults effectively from contact insecticides, which are only effective against the first-instar nymph stage known as the crawler. However, scales can often be controlled using horticultural oils that suffocate them, systemic pesticides that poison the sap of the host plants, or by biological control agents such as tiny parasitoid wasps and ladybirds. Insecticidal soap may also be used against scales.

One species, the cottony cushion scale, is a serious commercial pest on 65 families of woody plants, including Citrus fruits. It has spread worldwide from Australia.

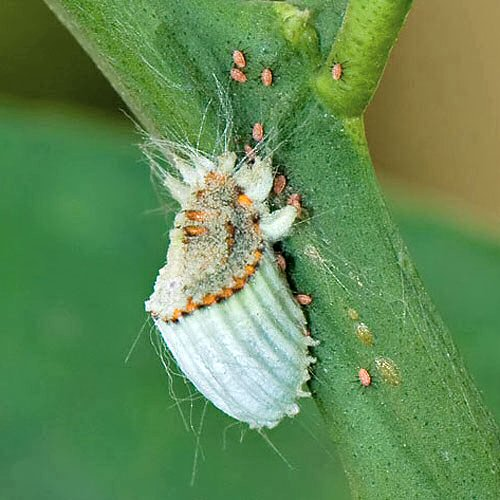
Adult female cottony cushion scale (Icerya purchasi) with young crawlers. The species is a major commercial pest of crops such as Citrus fruits.

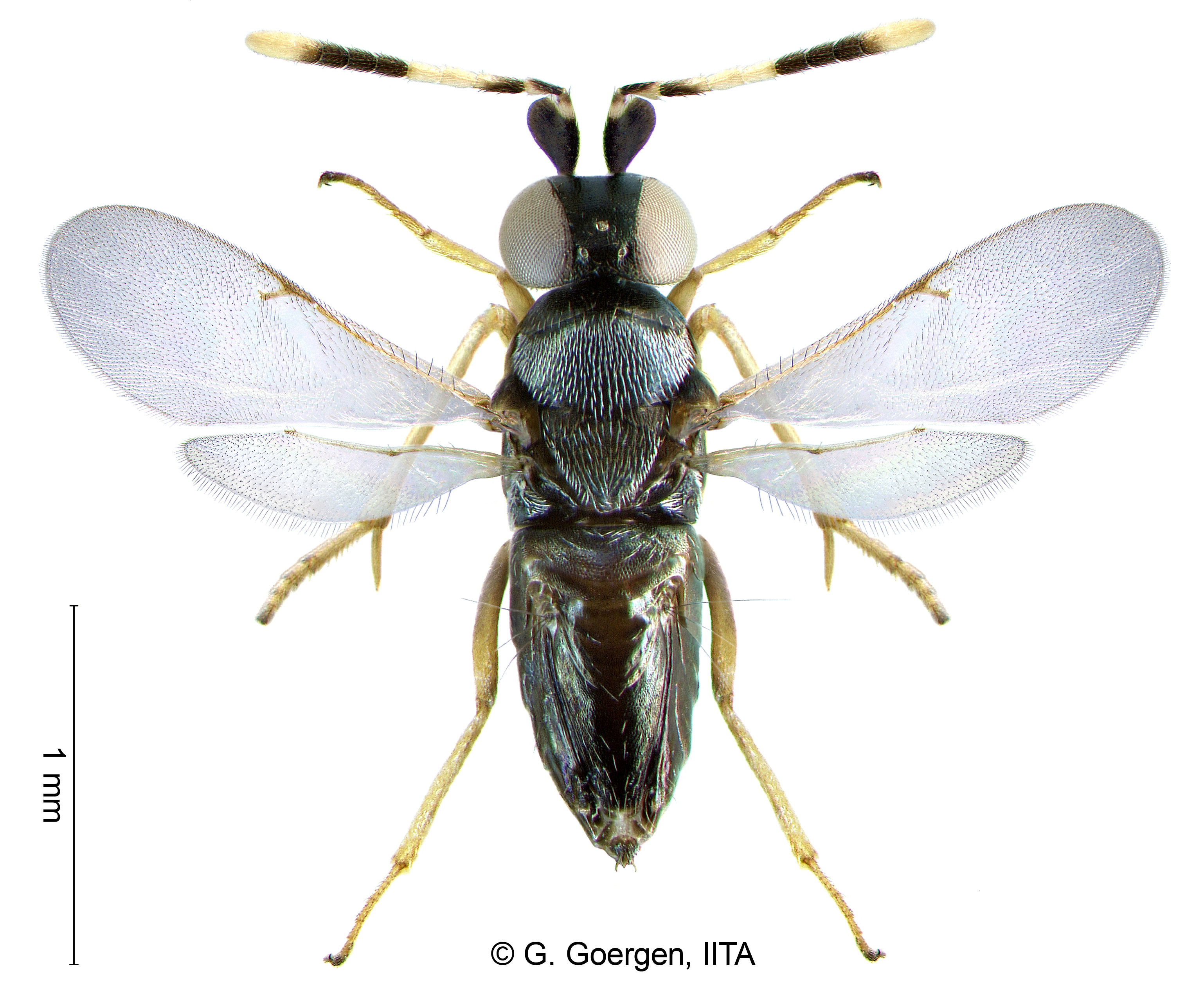
The tiny parasitic wasp Anagyrus lopezi, a highly effective biological control of the cassava mealybug

=== As biological controls ===
At the same time, some kinds of scale insects are themselves useful as biological control agents for pest plants, such as various species of cochineal insects that attack invasive species of prickly pear, which spread widely especially in Australia and Africa.

=== Products ===
Some types of scale insect are economically valuable for the substances they can yield under proper husbandry. Some, such as the cochineal, kermes, lac, Armenian cochineal, and Polish cochineal, have been used to produce red dyes for coloring foods and dyeing fabrics. Both the colour name "crimson" and the generic name Kermes are from Italian carmesi or cremesi for the dye used for Italian silk textiles, in turn from the Persian qirmizī (قرمز), meaning both the colour and the insect. The colour name "scarlet" is similarly derived from Arabic siklāt, denoting extremely expensive luxury silks dyed red using kermes.

Some waxy scale species in the genera Ceroplastes and Ericerus produce materials such as Chinese wax, and several genera of lac scales produce shellac.

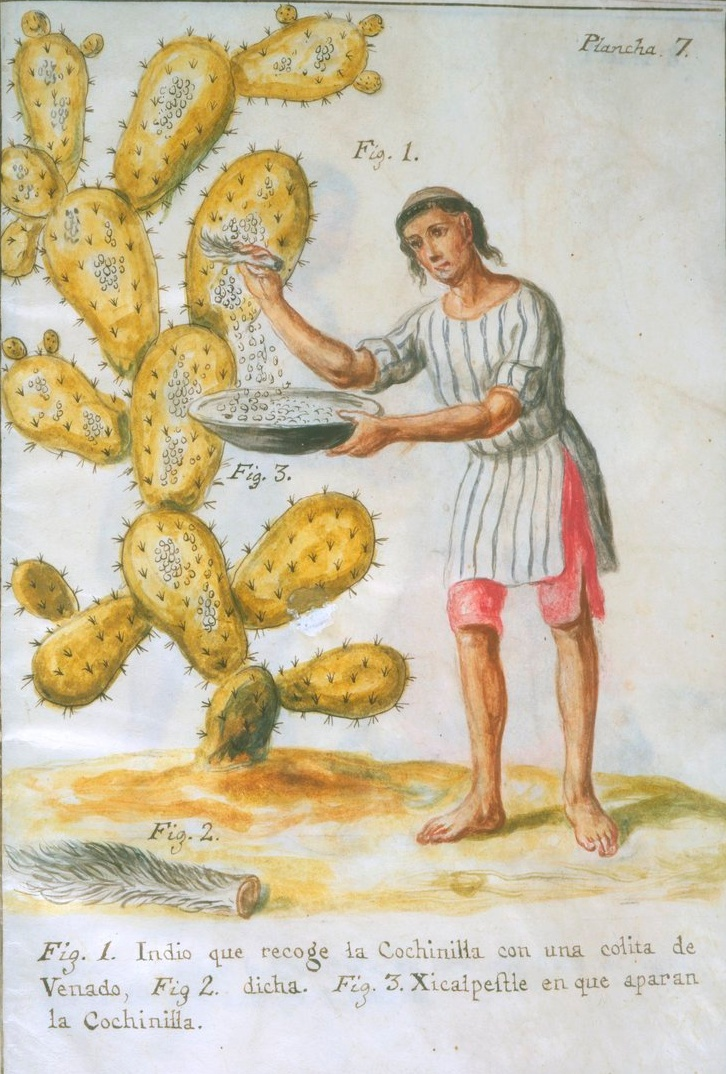
Collecting scale insects from a prickly pear for a dyestuff, cochineal, 1777

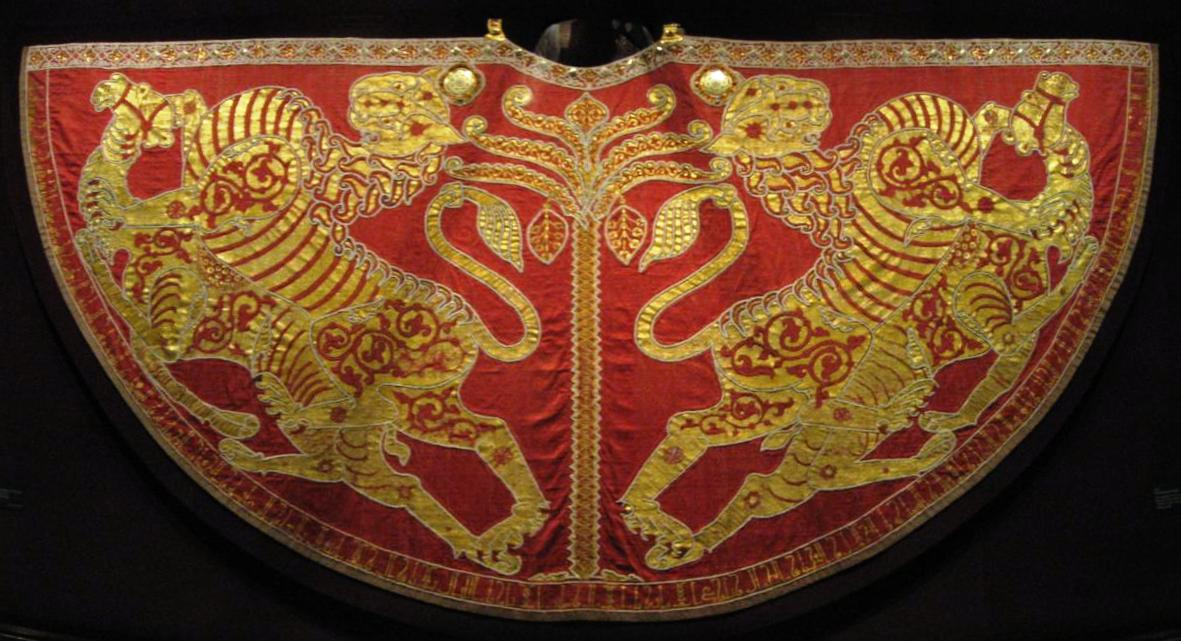
Coronation cloak of King Roger II of Sicily, 1133. Silk scarlet cloth dyed with kermes, made from female Kermes scales

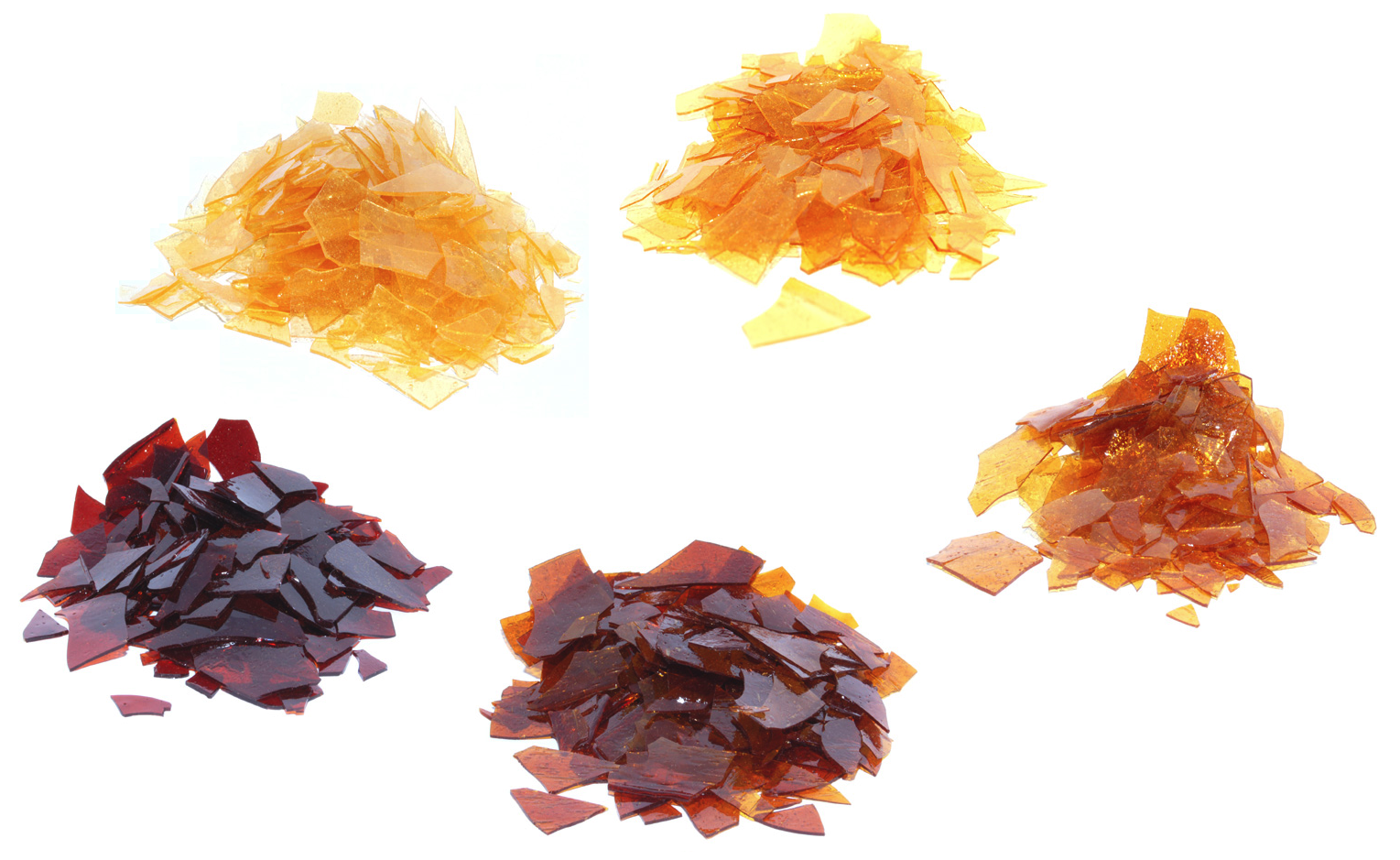
Some varieties of shellac

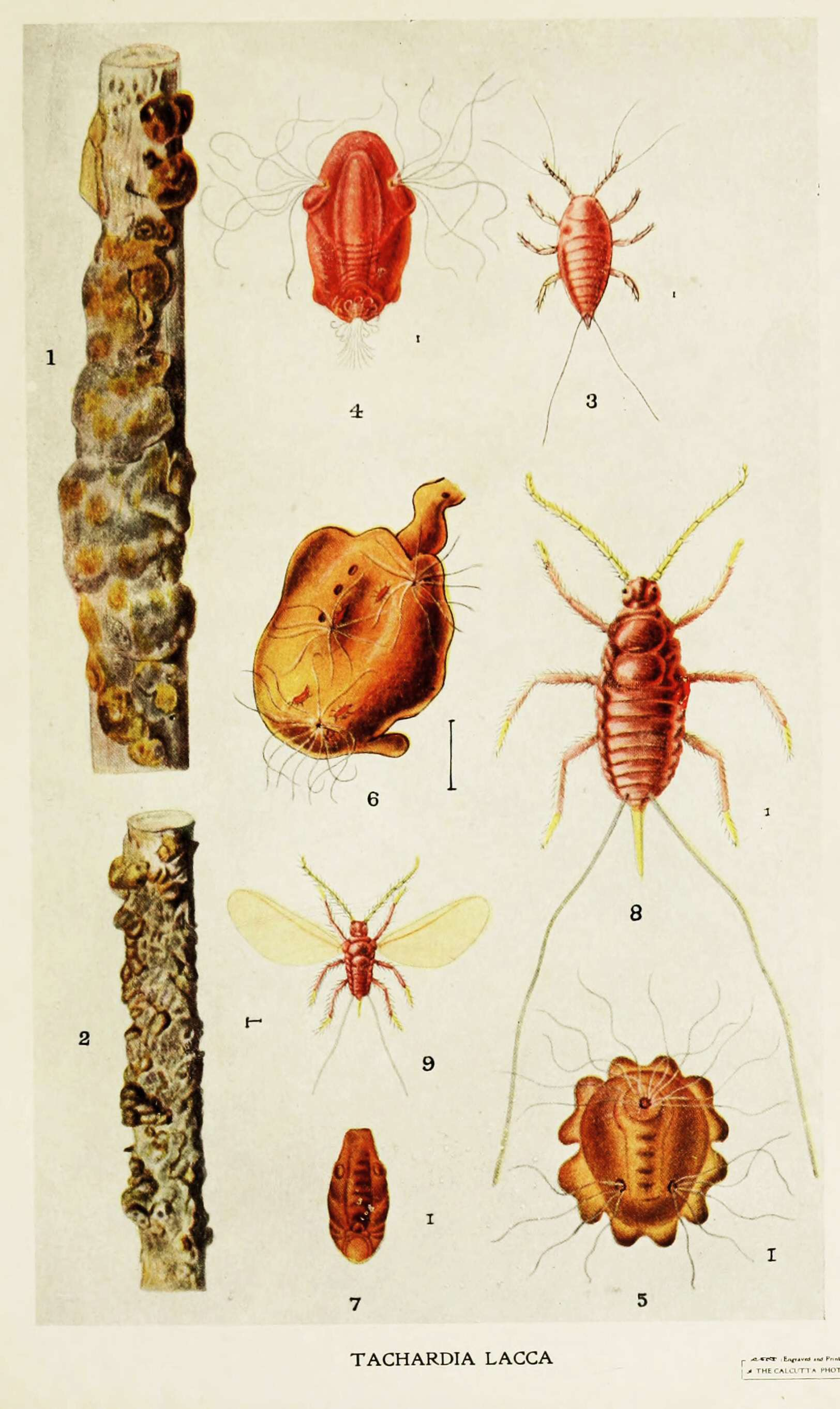
Kerria lacca and its shellac tubes

== Evolution ==
The containing group of the scale insects was formerly treated as the superfamily Coccoidea but taxonomic uncertainties have led workers to prefer the use of the infraorder Coccomorpha as the preferred name for the group. Scale insects are members of the Sternorrhyncha. The phylogeny of the extant Sternorrhyncha, from a 2024 study using ultraconserved genetic elements, is shown in the cladogram:

- Sternorrhyncha
  - - Aleyrodoidea (whiteflies)
    - Psylloidea (jumping plant lice, etc.)
  - - Coccomorpha (scale insects)
    - Aphidomorpha
      - Phylloxeroidea (phylloxera bugs)
      - Aphididae (aphids)

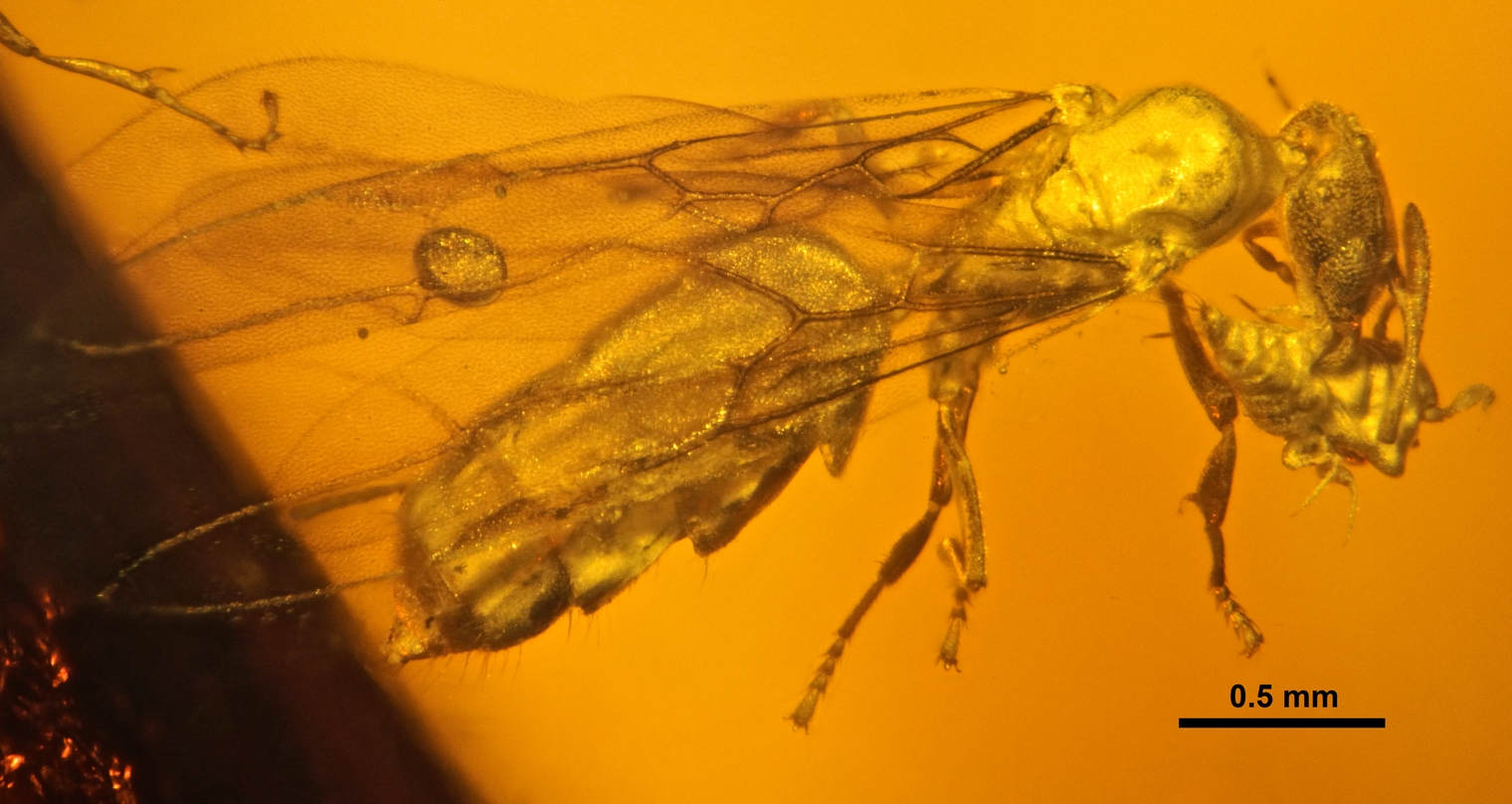
Fossil of the pseudococcid mealybug Electromyrmococcus (in the jaws of an ant) in Miocene Dominican amber

The timing of phylogenetic diversification within the Coccomorpha was estimated in a 2016 study based on molecular clock divergence time estimates, along with fossils being used for calibration. They suggested that the main scale insect lineages diverged before their angiosperm hosts, and suggested that the insects switched from feeding on gymnosperms once the angiosperms became common and widespread in the Cretaceous. They estimated that the Coccomorpha appeared at the start of the Triassic period, around 245 million years ago, and that the neococcoids appeared during the Early Jurassic, some 185 million years ago. Scale insects are very well represented in the fossil record, with the oldest known member of the group reported from the Late Jurassic amber from Lebanon. They are abundantly preserved in amber from the Early Cretaceous, 130 mya, onwards; they were already highly diversified by Cretaceous times. All the families were monophyletic except for the Eriococcidae. The Coccomorpha are division into two clades the "Archaeococcoids" and "Neococcoids". The archaeococcoid families have adult males with either compound eyes or a row of unicorneal eyes and have abdominal spiracles in the females. In neoccoids, the females have no abdominal spiracles. In the cladogram below the genus Pityococcus is moved to the "Neococcoids". A cladogram showing the major families using this methodology is shown below.

- Coccomorpha
  - "Archaeococcoids" ‑ Pityococcus
    - - †Burmacoccidae
      - †Kozariidae
    - - - Matsucoccidae (pine bast scales)
        - Ortheziidae (ensign scales)
      - - Margarodidae (ground pearls)
        - - Kuwaniidae
          - - Xylococcidae
            - - Coelostomidiidae
              - Monophlebidae (cottony cushion scales)
  - "Neococcoids" + Pityococcus
    - Pityococcidae
    - - Steingeliidae
      - - - Phenacoleachiidae
          - Putoidae (giant mealybugs)
        - - Pseudococcidae (mealybugs)
          - - - Coccidae (soft scales)
              - - Kermesidae (kermes dye scales)
                - - Asterolecaniidae (pit scales)
                  - Kerriidae (lac scales)
            - - - Dactylopiidae (cochineal insects)
                - Palaearctic "Eriococcidae" (felted scales)
              - - Beesoniidae, Stictococcidae, part of "Eriococcidae"
                - - Phoenicococcidae (palm scales)
                  - Diaspididae (armoured scales)

Recognition of scale insect families has fluctuated over time, and the validity of many remains in flux, with several recognized families not included in the phylogeny presented above including extinct groups are listed below:

- Archecoccoidea Borchsenius, 1958
  - †Apticoccidae Vea & Grimaldi, 2015
  - †Arnoldidae Koteja, 2008
  - †Burmacoccidae Koteja, 2004
  - Callipappidae MacGillivray, 1921
  - Coelostomidiidae Morrison, 1927
  - †Electrococcidae Koteja, 2000
  - †Grimaldiellidae Koteja, 2000
  - †Grohnidae Koteja, 2008
  - †Hammanococcidae Koteja & Azar, 2008
  - †Jankotejacoccidae Szwedo, Azar & Sendi, 2024
  - †Jersicoccidae Koteja, 2000
  - †Kozariidae Vea & Grimaldi, 2015
  - †Kukaspididae Koteja & Poinar, 2001
  - Kuwaniidae MacGillivray, 1921
  - †Labiococcidae Koteja, 2000b
  - †Lebanococcidae Koteja & Azar, 2008
  - †Lithuanicoccidae Koteja, 2008
  - †Macrodrilidae Poinar, 2020
  - Marchalinidae Morrison, 1927
  - Margarodidae Cockerell, 1899
  - Matsucoccidae Morrison, 1927
  - Monophlebidae Morrison, 1927
  - Ortheziidae Amyot & Audinet-Serville, 1843
  - †Pennygullaniidae Koteja & Azar, 2008
  - Phenacoleachiidae Cockerell, 1902
  - Pityococcidae McKenzie, 1942
  - Putoidae Tang, 1992
  - †Serafinidae Koteja, 2008
  - Steingeliidae Morrison, 1927
  - Stigmacoccidae Morrison, 1927
  - Termitococcidae Jakubski, 1965
  - †Weitschatidae Koteja, 2008
  - Xylococcidae Pergande in Hubbard & Pergande, 1898
- Neococcoidea Borchsenius, 1950
  - Aclerdidae Cockerell, 1905
  - †Albicoccidae Koteja, 2004
  - Asterolecaniidae Cockerell, 1896
  - Beesoniidae Ferris, 1950
  - Calycicoccidae Brain, 1918
  - Carayonemidae Richard, 1986
  - Cerococcidae Balachowsky, 1942
  - Cissococcidae Brain, 1918
  - Coccidae Fallen, 1814
  - Conchaspididae Green, 1896
  - Cryptococcidae Kosztarab, 1968
  - Dactylopiidae Signoret, 1875
  - Diaspididae Targioni-Tozzetti, 1868
  - Eriococcoidae Cockerell, 1899
  - Halimococcidae Brown & McKenzie, 1962
  - †Hodgsonicoccidae Vea & Grimaldi, 2015
  - †Inkaidae Koteja, 1989
  - Kermesidae Signoret, 1875
  - Kerriidae Lindinger, 1937
  - Lecanodiaspididae Targioni-Tozzetti, 1869
  - Micrococcidae Silvestri, 1939
  - Phoenicococcidae Stickney, 1934
  - Porphyrophoridae Signoret, 1875
  - Pseudococcidae Cockerell, 1905
  - Rhizoecidae Williams, 1969
  - Stictococcidae Lindinger, 1913
  - Tachardiidae Green, 1896

== See also ==
- Conchaspis capensis
- Non-human agriculture
- Lepidosaphes beckii
