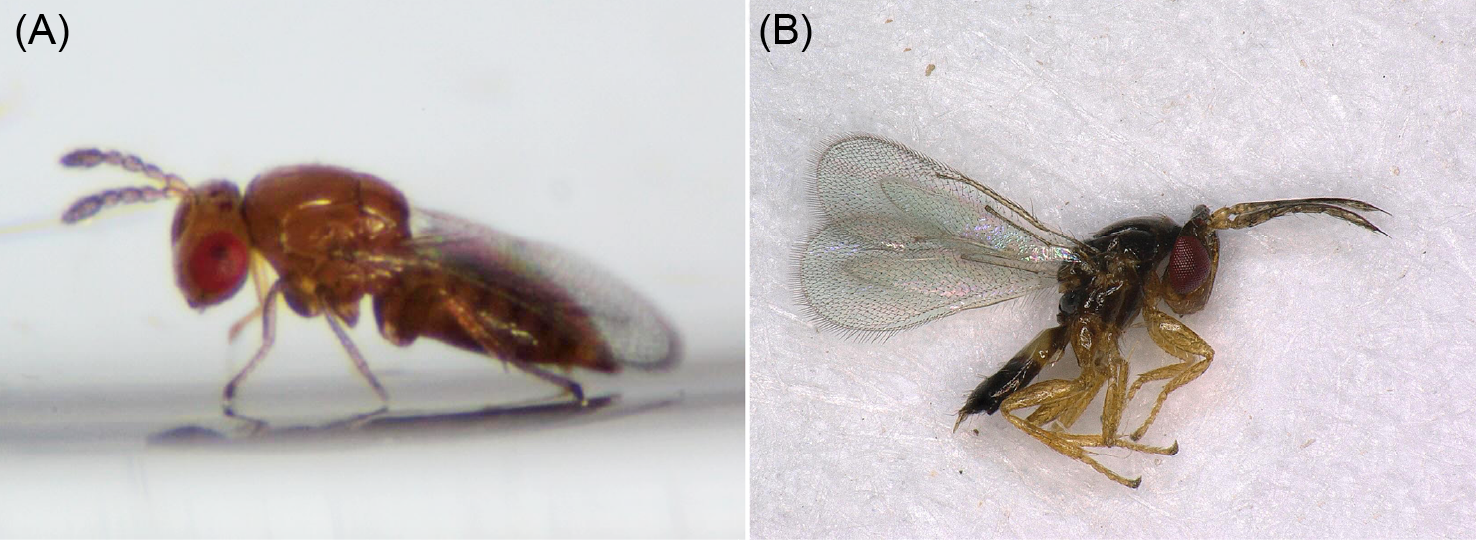
- Aprostocetus causalis

Scientific classification
- Kingdom: Animalia
- Phylum: Arthropoda
- Clade: Pancrustacea
- Class: Insecta
- Order: Hymenoptera
- Family: Eulophidae
- Tribe: Tetrastichini
- Genus: Aprostocetus; Westwood, 1833

Type species
- Aprostocetus caudatus Westwood, 1833

= Aprostocetus =

Genus of wasps

Aprostocetus is a genus of hymenopteran insects of the family Eulophidae. The genus was erected by John O. Westwood in 1833. This very large group (about 800 described species) of parasitoid wasps has a global distribution.

== Species ==
=== Widespread species ===
- A. antiguensis – Caribbean, Florida
  - A parasitoid recorded on the coccid scale insect Ceroplastes floridensis and the tischeriid moth Tischeria heliopsisella
- A. asthenogmus – Palaearctic, North Africa, Indomalaya, Seychelles, Caribbean
  - A parasitoid of blattid cockroaches of the genus Periplaneta
- A. beatus – Australia (Queensland), Oceania, southern Africa
  - A parasitoid of various bugs – members of the families Cicadellidae, Delphacidae and Tropiduchidae are recorded as hosts
- A. bruzzonis – Holarctic
  - A parasitoid of tortoise beetles of the genus Cassida
- A. ceroplastae -Holarctic, Near East and also introduced into parts of Africa and Australia for biocontrol purposes
  - A parasitoid of various coccid scale insects
- A. crino – Holarctic, Indomalaya
  - A parasitoid of crickets of the genus Oecanthus
- A. diplosidis – Cosmopolitan
  - A parasitoid on various gall midges
- A. dubius – Indonesia, New Guinea
  - A parasitoid of katydids in the Sexavaini
- A. fasciatus – Northern South America, Caribbean, India
  - A parasitoid of various gall midges
- A. fidius – Central and southern United States, Caribbean
  - A parasitoid of various gall midges
- A. formosanus – Hawaii, South East Asia, Madagascar
  - A parasitoid on various delphacid bugs
- A. gala – Caribbean, Florida, Australia, India
  - A parasitoid recorded on various gall midges and curculionid weevils
- A. hagenowii – Cosmopolitan, used in North America for biocontrol of cockroaches
  - A parasitoid of various cockroaches, also recorded from bark beetles and evaniid wasps
- A. leucone – Holarctic
- A. longicauda – Holarctic
- A. marylandensis – Central and eastern United States, Caribbean
  - A parasitoid recorded on a wide range of hosts including gall midges, curculionid weevils, aphidid aphids, gelechiid and tortricid moths and fellow eulophids
- A. megameli – Philippines, Hawaii
  - A parasitoid on the delphacid bug Megamelus proserpina
- A. microcosmus – Holarctic, Neotropical and Afrotropical regions, Indomalaya and Australia
  - Host unknown but associated with Hyparrhenia hirta
- A. microscopicus – Holarctic
  - A parasitoid on various gall midges
- A. minutus – Holarctic, Neotropical, North Africa
  - A parasitoid recorded on a huge range of hosts including many Coleoptera, Hemiptera, Hymenoptera and Neuroptera
- A. neglectus – Holarctic, North Africa, Near East and Indomalaya
  - A parasitoid on various lady beetles, also recorded on the aphidid aphid Myzus cerasi
- A. niger – Indomalaya, Australia
  - A parasitoid on the triozid bug Trioza fletcheri
- A. pallipes – Holarctic
  - A parasitoid on various gall midges, also recorded on the eriocraniid moth Eriocrania semipurpurella
- A. pausiris – Holarctic
  - A parasitoid recorded on the gall midge Dasineura leguminicola and chloropid flies of the genus Lipara
- A. percaudatus – Europe, India
  - A parasitoid of crickets of the genus Oecanthus
- A. pygmaeus – Holarctic
  - A parasitoid on various gall midges and apid bees
- A. sicarius – Former Yugoslavia, Africa, Near East
  - A parasitoid recorded on various coccid scale insects and the buprestid beetle Agrilus sinuatus
- A. sobrius – Nearctic, Russia
  - A parasitoid of gall midges of the genus Asphondylia, also recorded on a fellow chalcidoid, the eurytomid Bruchophagus gibbus
- A. strobilanae – Holarctic
  - A parasitoid recorded on various gall midges and tortricid moths, also recorded on a fellow chalcidoid, the torymid Torymus azureus
- A. terebrans – Holarctic
- A. toddaliae – Near East, Madagascar
  - A parasitoid of coccid scale insects of the genus Ceroplastes
- A. venustus – Holarctic
  - A parasitoid recorded on various gall midges and eurytomid wasps of the genus Bruchophagus
- A. zosimus – Holarctic, North Africa and New Zealand
  - A parasitoid recorded on a very wide range of insects including Diptera, Lepidoptera and Hymenoptera. Parasitized in turn by the eupelmid Eupelmus allynii

=== Palaearctic species ===
- A. aartseni – Greece
- A. acron – Czech Republic
- A. aega – Palaearctic
  - A parasitoid of the gall midge Dasineura glechomae
- A. aethiops – Palaearctic
  - Recorded as a parasitoid on a variety of insects including bean weevils, gall midges, gall wasps and other chalcidoids (family Eurytomidae)
- A. agevilleae – Italy, Slovakia
  - A parasitoid of the gall midge Agevillea abietis
- A. agrus – Palaearctic
- A. albae – China (Shaanxi province)
  - A parasitoid of the bark beetle Cryphalus exiguus
- A. alveatus – Palaearctic, North Africa
  - A parasitoid recorded on the gall midge Massalongia rubra and the gall wasp Rhodites mayri
- A. amenon – Palaearctic
  - A parasitoid of the gall midge Dasineura ulmaria
- A. andalusicus – Spain
  - A parasitoid of gall wasps of the genus Plagiotrochus
- A. annulatus – Central Europe
  - A parasitoid recorded on the gall midge Asphondylia sarothamni and some coccid scale insects
- A. anodaphus – Palaearctic
  - A parasitoid of the gall midge Rhopalomyia ptarmicae
- A. apama – Palaearctic
  - A parasitoid of various gall midges
- A. apiculatus – Palaearctic
- A. aquaticus – Palaearctic
  - Host unknown but associated with Phragmites australis
- A. aquilus – Britain
  - A parasitoid of the gall midge Dasineura trifolii
- A. arathis – Britain
- A. arenarius – Europe
- A. aristaeus – Palaearctic
- A. arrabonicus – Palaearctic
  - Host unknown but associated with Alopecurus pratensis
- A. arsenjevi – Far eastern Russia
- A. artemisiae – Palaearctic
  - A parasitoid of gall midges of the genus Rhopalomyia
- A. artemisicola – Palaearctic
  - A parasitoid of the gall midge Contarinia artemisiae
- A. askewi – France
  - Host unknown but associated with Daucus carota
- A. atticus – Greece
  - A parasitoid of gall midges of the genus Cystiphora
- A. aurantiacus – Palaearctic
  - A parasitoid of gall wasps of the genus Diplolepsis
- A. avetjanae – Armenia
  - A parasitoid of the gall wasp Diplolepsis fructuum
- A. azoricus – Azores
- A. bakkendorfi – Denmark
  - A parasitoid associated with gall producing insects on Astragalus glycyphyllos
- A. balasi – Central Europe
  - A parasitoid of moths – recorded on gracillariids of the genus Phyllocnistis and the tortricid Pseudargyrotoza conwagana
- A. beringi – Far eastern Russia
- A. beroe – Britain
- A. beyazus – Iran
- A. biorrhizae – Palaearctic

A parasitoid of the gall wasp Biorhiza pallida (which causes oak apples)

- A. blandus – Far eastern Russia
- A. blastophagusi – China (Heilongjiang)
  - A parasitoid of the bark beetles Ips subelongatus and Tomicus pilifer
- A. boreus – Europe
  - A parasitoid of the tephritid fruit flies Euleia heraclei and Philophylla heraclei
- A. bouceki – Spain
- A. brachycerus – Palaearctic
  - A parasitoid on various gall midges, also recorded on the nepticulid moth Nepticula argyropeza
- A. pennis – Czech Republic, Slovakia
- A. bucculentus – Armenia, Turkey, Israel
  - A parasitoid on a fellow chalcidoid – the eurytomid Eurytoma amygdali
- A. calamarius – Palaearctic
  - A parasitoid on various gall midges
- A. calvus – Palaearctic
  - A parasitoid recorded on the cockroach Loboptera decipiens and the evaniid wasp Zeuxevania splendidula
- A. capitigenae – Palaearctic
  - A parasitoid on the gall midge Bayeria capitigena
- A. capnopterus – Southern Europe
- A. catius – Palaearctic
- A. caudatus – Palaearctic
  - A parasitoid on the gall midge Dasineura alopecuri
- A. cebennicus – France
- A. cecidomyiarum – Palaearctic
  - A parasitoid on various gall midges, also recorded on the gall wasp Biorhiza pallida (which causes oak apples)
- A. celtidis – Europe
  - A parasitoid on leaf beetles of the genus Pyrrhalta, also recorded on the gracillariid moth Lithocolletis lantanella
- A. cerricola – Palaearctic
  - A parasitoid on the gall midge Macrodiplosis dryobia
- A. chakassicus – Russia
  - A parasitoid on the gall midge Dasineura rozhkovi
- A. ciliatus – Palaearctic
  - A parasitoid on the gall midge Rabdophaga heterobia
- A. citrinus – Palaearctic
  - A parasitoid on various gall midges, also recorded on the gall wasp Aylax rogenhoferi
- A. citripes – Europe
  - A parasitoid on various dytiscid beetles, also recorded on the lasiocampid moth Dendrolimus pini
- A. clavicornis – Palaearctic
  - A parasitoid recorded on various gall midges, aphids and scale insects
- A. claviger – Palaearctic
- A. coccidiphagus – Britain
  - A parasitoid on kermesid scale insects of the genus Kermes
- A. collega – Europe
  - A parasitoid on various gall midges
- A. constrictus – Palaearctic
  - A parasitoid recorded on brentid beetles of the genus Apion and gall midges of the genus Oligotrophus
- A. cracens – Southern Europe, Turkey
  - A parasitoid on the buprestid beetle Coraebus rubi
- A. craneiobiae – Northern Europe
  - A parasitoid on various gall midges
- A. crassiceps – Central Europe
- A. crypturgus – China (Shaanxi province)
  - A parasitoid on various bark beetles
- A. csokakoensis – Palaearctic
- A. culminis – France
- A. cultratus – Britain
- A. curtivena – France
- A. cycladum – Greece
  - Host unknown but associated with Thymelaea hirsuta
- A. cyniphidum – Central Europe
  - A parasitoid on various gall wasps
- A. dauci – - Palaearctic
  - A parasitoid on various gall midges
- A. debilitatus – France
- A. deceptor – France
- A. dendroctoni – China (Guizhou province)
  - A parasitoid on various bark and longhorn beetles
- A. deobensis – Palaearctic
  - A parasitoid on the tenthredinid sawfly Pontania viminalis
- A. dezhnevi – Far eastern Russia
- A. distichus – Central Europe
- A. diversus – Palaearctic
  - A parasitoid recorded on a wide range of insects including curculionid weevils, gall midges and gracillariid and lyonetiid moths
- A. doksyensis – Czech Republic
- A. domenichinii – Palaearctic
  - A parasitoid on various gall midges and gall wasps
- A. dotus – Britain
  - A parasitoid of the gall midge Dasineura ulmaria
- A. dryocoetae – Sweden
- A. dryocosmi – China (Zhejiang province)
  - A parasitoid on the gall wasp Dryocosmus kuriphilus
- A. durmitorensis – former Yugoslavia
- A. elegantulus – France
- A. eleuchia – Western Europe
  - A parasitoid of the gall midge Cystiphora sonchi
- A. elongatus – Europe, Near East
  - A parasitoid of variouschalcidoids and gall midges
- A. emesa – Palaearctic
  - A parasitoid on the gall midge Dasineura alopecuri
- A. epicharmus – Palaearctic
  - A parasitoid on various gall midges
- A. epilobiellus – Netherlands
  - A parasitoid on the gall midge Dasineura epilobii
- A. epilobii – Central Europe
  - A parasitoid on the gall midge Dasineura epilobii
- A. eratus – Britain
- A. ericae – France
  - A parasitoid on the gall midge Cecidomyia ericoscopariae
- A. eriophyes – Europe, Near East

A parasitoid on various eriophyid mites

- A. ermaki – Far eastern Russia
- A. escherichi – Palaearctic
  - A parasitoid on various gall midges
- A. esherensis – Britain
- A. euagoras – Britain
- A. eupatorii – Palaearctic
- A. eupolis – Britain
- A. eurystoma – Palaearctic
- A. eurytomae – Palaearctic, Near East
  - A parasitoid on various gall wasps – also recorded on the eurytomid Eurytomus rosae
- A. eurytus – Europe
  - A parasitoid recorded on a wide range of insects including apionid beetles, ledrid bugs, gall wasps and eurytomid chalcidoids
- A. extensus – France
- A. fabicola – Palaearctic
  - A parasitoid on the gall midge Lasioptera fabae
- A. facetus – Russia (Adygea)
- A. femoralis – Palaearctic
  - A parasitoid on various weevils (family Curculionidae) and moths (families Gracillariidae and Lyonetiidae)
- A. flavicapitus – Far eastern Russia
- A. flavifrons – Italy, Madeira
  - A parasitoid on the agromyzid fly Cerodontha pygmaea
- A. flavovarius – Europe
  - A parasitoid on various gall midges, also recorded on the gracillariid moth Lithocolletis platani
- A. flumenius – Far eastern Russia
- A. fonscolombei – Palaearctic
- A. foraminifer – France
- A. forsteri – Palaearctic
  - A parasitoid on various gall wasps
- A. fukutai – China (Hebei), Taiwan
  - A parasitoid on various longhorn beetles
- A. fulvipes – Palaearctic
- A. fusificola – France
  - A parasitoid on the gall wasp Plagiotrochus fusifex
- A. garganensis – Greece, Italy
- A. gaus – Europe
  - A parasitoid on the gall midge Dasineura leguminicola
- A. glandicola – France
  - A parasitoid on the gall wasp Callirhytis glandium
- A. gnomus – Palaearctic
- A. graciliclava – Greece
- A. grahami – Moldova
  - A parasitoid on curculionid weevils of the genus Lignyodes
- A. grandicauda – Far eastern Russia
- A. grandii – Palaearctic
  - A parasitoid on various gall midges
- A. gratus – Palaearctic
  - A parasitoid on various gall midges
- A. grylli – Palaearctic
- A. habarovi – Far eastern Russia
- A. hanka – Far eastern Russia
- A. hedqvisti – Palaearctic
  - A parasitoid on the bark beetle Tomicus minor
- A. hians – Madeira
- A. holomelas – Hungary
  - Host unknown but associated with Quercus cerris
- A. holoxanthus – Eastern Palaearctic
- A. humilis – Western Europe
  - A parasitoid of gall midges of the genus Mayetiola
- A. hyperfuniculus – Far eastern Russia
- A. ibericus – Spain
- A. ilexi – China (Jiangxi)
  - A parasitoid on various gall midges
- A. impurus – Switzerland
- A. incrassatus – Britain, Sweden, Russia, Turkey
  - Host unknown but associated with Carex spp
- A. invidus – Southern Europe, Near East
  - A parasitoid on various gall midges
- A. ione – Britain
- A. krusenschterni – Far eastern Russia
- A. lacaena – Britain
- A. lachares – Europe
- A. lacunatus – Britain
- A. larzacensis – Palaearctic
- A. laticeps – France
- A. leptocerus – Palaearctic
- A. leptoneuros – Palaearctic
  - A parasitoid recorded on various kermesid scale insects and also on the tortricid moth Carpocapsa pomonella and the fellow eulophid Tetrastichus pachyneurus
- A. levadiensis – Greece
- A. ligus – Britain
- A. lituratus – Poland
- A. longiclava – Far eastern Russia
- A. longipectus – Southern Russia (Astrakhan Oblast)
- A. longiscapus – Palaearctic
  - A parasitoid on various gall midges
- A. longispinus – Far eastern Russia
- A. longistigma – Far eastern Russia
- A. longulus – Europe
- A. lutescens – Spain
  - A parasitoid on the fellow chalcidoid Blascoa ephedrae (Pteromalidae)
- A. luteus – Europe
  - A parasitoid on various gall midges and fellow eulophids (including Aprostocetus elongatus)
- A. lycidas – Europe, North Africa
  - A parasitoid on various gall midges
- A. lycidoides – Greece
- A. lysippe – Palaearctic
  - A parasitoid on the gall midge Dasineura crataegi
- A. malagensis – Spain
- A. mandanis – Europe
  - A parasitoid on various delphacid bugs
- A. masculinus – France
- A. massonianae – China (Guizhou)
  - A parasitoid on the bark beetle Cryphalus massonianus
- A. maurus – Hungary
- A. mazaeus – Britain
- A. menius – Palaearctic
- A. meridionalis – Southern Europe
- A. meroe – Western Europe
- A. metra – Palaearctic
  - A parasitoid on various gall midges
- A. micantulus – Palaearctic
  - A parasitoid on the gall midge Dasineura abietiperda
- A. microocellus – Far eastern Russia
- A. mimulus – Greece
- A. minimus – Palaearctic
  - A parasitoid of gall midges of the genus Rabdophaga
- A. miridivorus – France, Italy
  - A parasitoid of various mirid bugs
- A. moldavicus – Moldova
  - A parasitoid on the gall midge Dasineura mali
- A. morairensis – Spain
- A. muiri – China (Guangdong)
- A. mycerinus – Palaearctic
  - Host unknown but associated with Salix spp
- A. myrsus – Britain
  - A parasitoid on the gall midge Contarinia rumicis
- A. natans – Central Russia, Ukraine
  - A parasitoid on various dytiscid beetles
- A. nigriventris – Far eastern Russia
- A. novatus – Europe
  - A parasitoid on the gall midge Agevillea abietis
- A. nubigenus – Palaearctic
- A. nymphis – Britain
- A. obliquus – Palaearctic
- A. occidentalis – Southern Europe, Canary Islands, Madeira
- A. oculisetatus – Far eastern Russia
- A. oreophilus – Europe
  - A parasitoid recorded on the leaf beetle Cryptocephalus pini and the gall wasp Cynips caputmedusae
- A. orestes – Central Europe
- A. orithyia – Palaearctic
  - A parasitoid of various flies (gall midges and the chloropid Lipara lucens)
- A. oropus – Britain
- A. ovivorax – Europe
  - A parasitoid of the cricket Oecanthus pellucens
- A. pachyneuros – Europe
  - A parasitoid on various kermesid scale insects and fellow chalcidoids
- A. pallidipedes – Far eastern Russia
- A. pallidipes – Japan
- A. palustris – Northern Europe
- A. pantshenkoi – Southern Russia
- A. paralus – Britain
- A. peischula – Far eastern Russia
- A. perfulvescens – Greece
- A. perone – Northern Europe
- A. phillyreae – Palaearctic
  - Host unknown but associated with Phillyrea spp
- A. phineus – Europe
- A. phloeophthori – Palaearctic
  - A parasitoid on the bark beetle Phloeophthorus rhododactylus
- A. phragmiticola – Palaearctic
  - A parasitoid on the gall midge Giraudiella inclusa
- A. phragmitinus – Europe
  - Host unknown but associated with Phragmites spp
- A. ping – Spain
- A. plagioderae – Moldova
  - A parasitoid on the leaf beetle Plagiodera versicolora
- A. plangon – Britain
- A. planiusculus – Palaearctic
  - A parasitoid on sesiid moths of the genus Chamaesphecia
- A. polygoni – Central Europe
  - Host unknown but associated with Polygonum persicaria
- A. popovi – Far eastern Russia
- A. problematicus – Hungary
  - A parasitoid recorded on the gall wasp Chilaspis nitida and gracillariid moths of the genus Lithocolletis
- A. productus – Palaearctic
- A. prolidice – Palaearctic
- A. prolixus – China (Hebei), Taiwan
  - A parasitoid on the longhorn beetle Apriona germarii
- A. prosymna – Britain
- A. pseudopodiellus – Europe
  - A parasitoid on lestid damselflies of the genus Lestes
- A. ptarmicae – Europe
  - A parasitoid of gall midges of the genus Rhopalomyia
- A. rhacius – Palaearctic
  - A parasitoid of the gall midge Dasineura trifolii
- A. rhipheus – Europe
- A. rhode – Britain
- A. rimskykorsakovi – Central Russia
- A. roesellae – Palaearctic
  - A parasitoid on various gall midges, also recorded on fellow chalcidoids and the yponomeutid moth Argyresthia conjugella
- A. rubi – Palaearctic
  - A parasitoid of the gall midge Lasioptera rubi
- A. rubicola – Palaearctic
  - A parasitoid of the gall midge Lasioptera rubi
- A. rufescens – Western Europe
  - A parasitoid of the gall wasp Neuroterus quercusbaccarum
- A. rufiscapus – Britain
- A. rufus – Europe
  - A parasitoid on dytiscid beetles of the genus Dytiscus
- A. rumicis – Northern Europe
  - A parasitoid on brentid weevils of the genus Apion
- A. salictorum – Palaearctic
  - A parasitoid on various gall midges
- A. schambala – Far eastern Russia
- A. scoticus – Britain
  - A parasitoid of the gall midge Jaapiella veronicae
- A. sensuna – Switzerland
- A. serratularum – Palaearctic
  - A parasitoid on various tephritid flies, also on gelechiid moths of the genus Metzneria
- A. setosulus – Central Europe
- A. sibiricus – Far eastern Russia
  - A parasitoid of the coccid scale insect Eulecanium secretum
- A. silaceus – Greece
- A. silvestris – Far eastern Russia
- A. spassk – Far eastern Russia
- A. specularis – France
- A. stenus – Europe
- A. stigmaticalis – Britain
  - Host unknown but associated with Betula pubescens
- A. subanellatus – Palaearctic
  - Host unknown but associated with Agrostis spp.
- A. subcylindricus – Czech Republic
- A. subplanus – Central Europe
- A. subterraneus – Hungary
  - A parasitoid of the gall midge Planetella frireni
- A. suevius – Europe
  - A parasitoid on various leaf beetles
- A. taiga – Far eastern Russia
- A. tanaceticola – Northern Europe
  - A parasitoid of the gall midge Rhopalomyia tanaceticola
- A. taxi – Europe
  - Host unknown but associated with Taxus baccata
- A. tenuiradialis – Europe
- A. tiliaceae – Czech Republic
  - A parasitoid of the gall midge Didymomyia tiliacea
- A. tilicola – Palaearctic
  - A parasitoid of the gall midge Contarinia tiliarum
- A. tompanus – Palaearctic
  - A parasitoid on apionid beetles of the genus Apion
- A. torquentis – Palaearctic
  - A parasitoid on various gall midges
- A. totis – Britain
- A. trjapitzini – Palaearctic, Near East
  - A parasitoid on various coccid scale insects, also recorded on a fellow chalcidoid, the encyrtid Microterys hortulanus
- A. truncatulus – France
- A. tymber – Palaearctic
  - A parasitoid on various gall midges
- A. vaccus – Britain
- A. vassolensis – Central Europe
- A. veronicae – Britain
  - A parasitoid of the gall midge Jaapiella veronicae
- A. verticalis – Britain
- A. verutus – Palaearctic
  - Host unknown but associated with various grasses
- A. viatorum – Madeira
- A. vicinus – Far eastern Russia
- A. viridescens – Central Europe
  - A parasitoid of the gall midge Cecidomyia baeri
- A. viridinitens – Palaearctic
- A. volgodonicus – Southern Russia
- A. voranus – Britain
- A. westwoodii – Central and Southern Europe
  - A parasitoid of gall midges of the genus Asphondylia
- A. wrangeli – Far eastern Russia
- A. xanthomelas – Central Europe
- A. xanthopus – Palaearctic
  - A parasitoid on various moths, also recorded on the bark beetle Carphoborus minimus
- A. xeuxes – Britain
- A. zerovae – Ukraine, Central Russia
- A. zoilus – Palaearctic
  - Host unknown but associated with Alopecurus pratensis

=== Indomalayan species ===
- A. ajmerensis – India (Rajasthan)
  - A parasitoid on the mealybug Coccidohystrix insolita
- A. annulicornis – India (Rajasthan)
  - A parasitoid on the mealybug Coccidohystrix insolita
- A. asphondyliae – India (Karnataka)
  - A parasitoid on the gall midge Asphondylia pongamiae
- A. bangaloricus – India (Karnataka)
  - A parasitoid on the kerriid scale insect Kerria lacca
- A. basalis – Indonesia (South Moluccas)
- A. coimbatorensis – India (Andhra Pradesh, Tamil Nadu)
  - A parasitoid on various gall midges
- A. distinguendus – Indonesia (South Moluccas)
  - A parasitoid on the delphacid bug Perkinsiella saccharicida
- A. flavidus – India (Andhra Pradesh)
- A. holochlorus – Indonesia (South Moluccas)
- A. homochromus – Indonesia (South Moluccas)
  - A parasitoid on the delphacid bug Perkinsiella vastatrix
- A. java – Indonesia (Java, Bali)
- A. kuriani – India (Orissa)
  - A parasitoid on various pyralid moths
- A. lasallei – India (Uttarakhand)
  - A parasitoid on various coccid scale insects
- A. lecanii – Indonesia (Java, Bali)
  - A parasitoid on various coccid scale insects
- A. maculatus – India (Uttar Pradesh)
  - A parasitoid on the mealybug Ferrisia virgata
- A. metallicus – Indonesia (South Moluccas)
- A. nainitalensis – India (Uttarakhand, Uttar Pradesh)
- A parasitoid on the kerriid bug Kerria lacca
- A. nigricornis – India (Uttar Pradesh)
  - A parasitoid on the mealybug Nipaecoccus vastator
- A. plesispae – Indonesia (Java, Bali)
  - A parasitoid on the leaf beetle Plesispa reichei
- A. psyllidis – India (Uttar Pradesh)
  - Host unknown but associated with Grewia asiatica
- A. purpureus – Pakistan, India, Bangladesh, Malaysia
  - A parasitoid on a wide range of scale insects, also recorded on some fellow chalcidoids
- A. sankarani – India
  - A parasitoid on various gall midges
- A. santalinus – India (Karnataka)
  - A parasitoid on the coccid scale insect Ceroplastes actiniformis
- A. tarsalis – Indonesia (South Moluccas)
  - A parasitoid on delphacid bugs of the genus Perkinsiella
- A. versicolor – Sri Lanka
  - A parasitoid recorded on various hymenopterans and moths
- A. yoshimotoi – India (Uttar Pradesh)
  - Host unknown but associated with Mangifera indica

=== Afrotropical species ===
- A. aeruginosus – Seychelles
- A. agnatus – Seychelles
- A. ambilobei – Madagascar
- A. ankaratrae – Madagascar
- A. aphloiae – Madagascar
- A. aspidomorphae – Kenya, Uganda
  - A parasitoid on tortoise beetles of the genera Aspidomorpha and Conchyloctenia
- A. brevistylus – Central Africa
  - A parasitoid on the diopsid fly Diopsis thoracica
- A. camerounensis – Cameroon
- A. cassidocida – Senegal
  - A parasitoid on tortoise beetles of the genus Aspidomorpha
- A. dineuri – Republic of Congo
  - A parasitoid recorded on the pyralid moth Sylepta derogata and the braconid wasp Apanteles sagax
- A. dolichocerus – Seychelles
- A. ghananensis – Ghana
- A. gowdeyi – Uganda
  - A parasitoid on the coccid scale insect Pulvinaria jacksoni
- A. gravans – Eritrea, Tanzania
  - A parasitoid on the coccid scale insect Coccus viridis and the mealybug Ferrisiana chrysophyllae
- A. hanangensis – Tanzania
- A. harongae – Madagascar
- A. hofferi – Algeria
- A. lamiicidus – Ghana, Nigeria
  - A parasitoid on longhorn beetles of the genus Tragocephala
- A. leroyi – Democratic Republic of the Congo
- A. leucopterae – Tanzania
  - A parasitoid on various lyonetiid moths of the genus Leucoptera, also recorded on fellow eulophids of the genus Eulophus
- A. longiscutulum – Tanzania
- A. marinikius – Algeria
- A. melichlorus – Ghana
- A. microfuniculus – Algeria
- A. negetae – Senegal
  - A parasitoid on the noctuid moth Negeta luminosa
- A. nigriceps – Seychelles
- A. pauliani – Madagascar
  - A parasitoid on gall-producing insects on Plectronia spp
- A. phytolymae – Côte d'Ivoire
  - A parasitoid of the psyllid bug Phytolyma lata
- A. procerae – West Africa
  - A parasitoid on various gall midges, also recorded on the pyralid moth Chilo phaeosema
- A. regnieri – Congo, Kenya
- A. roseveari – Central Africa
  - A parasitoid on the psyllid bug Phytolyma lata
- A. salebrosus – Central Africa
  - A parasitoid on the psyllid bug Phytolyma lata
- A. scutellaris – Tanzania
- A. senegalensis – Senegal
- A. spinicornis – Rwanda
- A. stictococci – West Africa
  - A parasitoid on stictococcid scale insects of the genus Stictococcus
- A. theioneurus – Kenya, Madagascar, Seychelles
  - A parasitoid recorded on the pyralid moth Chilo partellus and the braconid wasp Cotesia sesamiae
- A. trichionotus – Central Africa
  - A parasitoid on the psyllid bug Phytolyma lata
- A. ugandaensis – Uganda
  - A parasitoid on the stictococcid scale insect Stictococcus gowdeyi

=== Nearctic species ===
- A. ajax – Northern United States
- A. americanus
- A. animus – Mexico, New Mexico
- A. anthophilus – South eastern Canada, north eastern United States
  - A parasitoid recorded on the gall midge Rhopalomyia anthophila and the totricid moth Zeiraphera ratzeburgiana
- A. anthracinus – Western North America
  - A parasitoid on the buprestid beetle Agrilus angelicus
- A. banksii – Eastern United States
  - A parasitoid on a fellow eulophid, Horismenus nitans
- A. blastophagi – Eastern United States
  - A parasitoid on the gall wasp Callirhytis blastophaga
- A. blattae – Eastern United States
  - A parasitoid on cockroaches of the genus Parcoblatta
- A. burksi – California
  - A parasitoid on various gall wasps
- A. cassidis – Eastern United States
  - A parasitoid on various leaf beetles
- A. cincinnatus
- A. esurus – Canada, United States
  - A parasitoid recorded on a very wide range of insects – mainly Lepidoptera (Arctiidae, Lasiocampidae, Lymantriidae, Noctuidae, Oecophoridae, Pyralidae, Tortricidae) but also Coleophoridae (Coccinellidae), Diptera (Tephritidae) and Hymenoptera (Encyrtidae)
- A. faustus – Central and western United States
  - A parasitoid on tephritid flies of the genus Rhagoletis
- A. florida – Florida
- A. garryana – Western Canada and United States
  - A parasitoid of various gall wasps
- A. gelastus – Florida
  - A parasitoid on various psyllid and triozid bugs
- A. gibboni – Central United States
  - A parasitoid on the languriid beetle Languria mozardi
- A. granulatus
- A. hesperius – Illinois
  - A parasitoid on the gall wasp Diplolepis ignota
- A. hibus – California
  - A parasitoid on various gall midges
- A. hillmeadia – Maryland
- A. homeri – Western United States
  - A parasitoid on various gall midges
- A. impexus – Virginia
  - A parasitoid on the gall wasp Disholcaspis quercusglobulus
- A. irvingi – New Mexico
- A. ischnopterae – Central and eastern United States
  - A parasitoid on various ectobiid cockroaches
- A. juniperi – Canada, northern United States
  - A parasitoid recorded on various hosts including the eriophyid mite Trisetacus quadrisetus, the curculionid weevil Anthonomus juniperinus and various gall midges
- A. kansasia – Kansas
- A. lasius – Central United States
  - A parasitoid on the gall midge Asteromyia agrostis
- A. longicorpus – New Mexico
  - A parasitoid on the tortricid moth Rhyacionia frustrana
- A. marcovitchi – United States
  - A parasitoid recorded on various hosts including gall midges, fellow chalcidoids and the curculionid weevil Anthonomus juniperinus
- A. marilandia – Maryland
- A. meltoftei – Greenland
- A. milleri – California
  - A parasitoid on the gelechiid moth Recurvaria milleri
- A. mymaridis – Illinois
  - A parasitoid on lestid damselflies of the genus Lestes
- A. nebraskensis – Eastern Canada, United States
  - A parasitoid on various gall midges, also recorded on the curculionid weevil Hypera nigrirostris
- A. neuroteri – Central and eastern United States
  - A parasitoid on gall wasps of the genus Neuroterus
- A. novus – Central and eastern United States
- A. Oklahoma – Central United States
  - A parasitoid on fellow chalcidoids (family Eurytomidae)
- A. oncideridis – West Virginia
  - A parasitoid on the longhorn beetle Oncideres cingulata
- A. orbitalis – Mexico, California
- A. oviductus – Maryland
- A. pandora – Oregon
  - A parasitoid on the saturniid moth Coloradia pandora
- A. pattersonae – United States
  - A parasitoid on various gall wasps
- A. politi – Eastern and southern United States
  - A parasitoid on the gall wasp Xanthoteras politum
- A. polynemae – Central and eastern United States
  - A parasitoid on various Odonata and the fairyfly Polynema needhami
- A. psyllaephagus – Arizona
  - A parasitoid on the triozid bug Trioza collaris
- A. punctatifrons – Arizona
  - A parasitoid on the lyonetiid moth Paraleucoptera albella
- A. rosae – North America
  - A parasitoid on gall wasps of the genus Diplolepis
- A. semiauraticeps – United States
  - A parasitoid on various gall midges
- A. silvaticus – North America
  - A parasitoid on various moths, also recorded on the diprionid sawfly Neodiprion swainei
- A. smilax - Florida
  - gall inducer on Smilax havanensis
- A. strobilus – North America
  - A parasitoid on various gall midges, also recorded on the tortricid moth Barbara colfaxiana and the ichneumon wasp Glypta evetriae
- A. tesserus – Northern United States
  - A parasitoid on various gall midges
- A. varicornis – Northeastern United States
  - A parasitoid on various tortricid moths
- A. verrucarii – United States
  - A parasitoid on gall wasps of the genus Neuroterus

=== Neotropical species ===
- A. acutipennis – Grenada, Saint Vincent and the Grenadines
- A. arachnophagus – Argentina, Uruguay
  - A parasitoid on various araneid and theridiid spiders.
- A. ashmeadi – Grenada
- A. baccharidis – Chile
- A. bahiensis – Brazil (Bahia)
  - Host unknown but associated with Ocotea opoifera
- A. basilaris – Grenada, Saint Vincent and the Grenadines
- A. basimaculata – Nicaragua
- A. bondari – Brazil (Bahia)
  - A parasitoid on the pauliniid grasshopper Paulinia elegans
- A. brasiliensis – Brazil (Mato Grosso)
- A. cacus – Brazil (Bahia)
- A. chapadae – South America
  - A parasitoid recorded on a wide range of insects including weevils, gall midges, coccid scale insects, gelechiid moths and braconid wasps
- A. cleonica – Brazil (Bahia)
- A. colliguayae – Chile
  - Phytophagous, causing galls on Colliguaja odorifera
- A. coxalis – Grenada
- A. cupreus – Grenada, Saint Vincent and the Grenadines
- A. daimachus – Brazil (Bahia)
- A. elevatus – Grenada
- A. februus – Brazil (Bahia)
- A. femoratus – Grenada, Saint Vincent and the Grenadines
- A. hyalinipennis – Paraguay
- A. ignigenus – Argentina
- A. infulatus – Argentina
- A. longicornis – Grenada, Saint Vincent and the Grenadines
- A. melleus – Brazil (Pará)
- A. narcaeus – Chile
- A. naucles – Chile
  - Host unknown but associated with Prosopis tamarugo
- A. norax – Chile
  - A parasitoid on the lasiocampid moth Macromphalia dedecora
- A. phryno – Brazil (Bahia)
- A. polypaea – Chile
- A. punctifrons – Saint Vincent and the Grenadines
- A. riverai – South America
  - A parasitoid of theridiid spiders of the genus Latrodectus
- A. similis – Grenada
- A. socialis – Chile
- A. thomasi – Chile
- A. vaquitarum – South America, Caribbean
  - A parasitoid recorded on the curculionid weevil Lachnopus coffeae and the elachistid moth Donacivola saccharella
- A. viridis – Grenada
- A. vulgaris – Grenada, Saint Vincent and the Grenadines
- A. xenocles – Chile
  - A parasitoid of coccid scale insects of the genus Ceroplastes
- A. zemani – South America
  - A parasitoid of various coccid scale insects

=== Australasian species ===
- A. acomatus – Queensland
- A. acuminativentris – Queensland
- A. acuminatus – Queensland
- A. acutiventris – Queensland
- A. aeneithorax – Queensland
- A. aeneoculex – Queensland
  - A parasitoid of leaf beetles of the genus Galeruca
- A. aeneon – Queensland
- A. aenosus – Queensland
- A. aeneus – Queensland
- A. affinis – Queensland
- A. anna – Queensland
- A. arses – Tasmania
- A. atrellus – Queensland
- A. atristigma – Queensland
- A. atriventris – Queensland
- A. aura – Queensland
- A. aurios – Queensland
- A. auriscutellum – Queensland
- A. auriventris – Queensland
- A. australicus – Queensland
- A. baucis – Western Australia
- A. bicolor – Queensland
- A. bilongifasciatus – Queensland
- A. boswelli – Queensland
- A. boussingaulti – Queensland
- A. brevis – Queensland
- A. brevistigma – South Australia
- A. brunneiventris – Queensland
- A. brunneus – Queensland
- A. burmeisteri – Northern Territory
- A. cinctiventer – Queensland
- A. cinctiventris – New South Wales
- A. cobdeni – Queensland
- A. consimilis – Queensland
- A. cressoni – Queensland
- A. culex – Queensland
- A. darwini – Queensland
- A. darwinianus – Queensland
- A. decii – Queensland
- A. dei – Queensland
- A. dymas – Tasmania
- A. eucalypti – South Australia
  - A parasitoid on fellow chalcidoids: recorded on Rhicnopletella spp. (Eulophidae) and Neomegastigmus ater (Torymidae)
- A. fannius – Tasmania
- A. fasciativenter – Tasmania
- A. fasciativentrosus – Queensland
- A. filiformis – New South Wales
- A. flavellinus – Queensland
- A. flavellus – Queensland
- A. flavicaput – Queensland
- A. flavicollis – Queensland
- A. flavicornis – Queensland
- A. flavios – Queensland
- A. flavipostscutellum – Queensland
- A. flaviscapus – Queensland
- A. flaviscutellum – Queensland
- A. flavobasalis – Queensland
- A. froggatti – New South Wales
- A. fulgens – Queensland
- A. fulvipostscutellum – Queensland
- A. fuscipennatus – South Australia
- A. fuscipennis – Queensland
- A. fuscitibiae – Tasmania
- A. fuscosus – Queensland
- A. fuscus – Queensland
- A. gloriosus – Queensland
- A. glycon – Tasmania
- A. gobius – Queensland
- A. gregi – Queensland
- A. grotiusi – Queensland
- A. guttatus – Queensland
- A. haeckeli – Queensland
- A. handeli – Queensland
- A. hetaericos – Queensland
- A. hexguttativentris – Queensland
- A. hyalinus – Queensland
- A. imago – New South Wales
- A. imperialis – Queensland
- A. indigenus – Queensland
- A. inghamensis – Queensland
- A. intentatus – Queensland
- A. io – Queensland
- A. ion – Queensland
- A. kelloggi – Queensland
- A. latithorax – Queensland
- A. lelaps – Western Australia
- A. lenini – Queensland
- A. limbus – Tasmania
- A. lineatus – Queensland
- A. longiclavus – Queensland
- A. longipennis – Queensland
- A. longiventris – Queensland
- A. lustris – Queensland
- A. mahometi – Queensland
- A. marginatus – Queensland
- A. margiscutellum – Queensland
- A. margiscutum – Queensland
  - A parasitoid associated with gall producing insects on Eucalyptus
- A. margiventris – Queensland
- A. margiventrosus – Queensland
- A. maximus – Queensland
- A. meridialis – Queensland
- A. meridianus – Victoria
- A. mesmeri – Queensland
- A. minutissimus – Queensland
- A. mirus – Queensland
- A. misericordia – Queensland
- A. montanus – Queensland
- A. monticola – Queensland
- A. morum – Queensland
- A. necopinatus – Queensland
- A. neis – Tasmania
- A. nelsonensis – Queensland
- A. nigriclava – Queensland
- A. nigrithorax – Queensland
- A. nomadis – Queensland
- A. novifasciatus – Queensland
- A. nubilipennis – Queensland
- A. nugatorius – Queensland
- A. nympha – Queensland
- A. obscurus – Queensland
- A. occultus – Queensland
- A. octoguttatus – New South Wales
- A. pallidicaput – Queensland
- A. pallidiventris – Queensland
- A. parvulus – Queensland
- A. pax – Queensland
- A. perkinsi – Queensland
- A. perobscurus – South Australia
- A. perpulcher – Queensland
- A. platoni – Queensland
- A. polychromus – Northern Territory
- A. pomosus – Queensland
- A. pontiac – South Australia
- A. postscutellatus – Queensland
- A. proto – Tasmania
- A. pulcher – Queensland
- A. pulchrinotatus – Queensland
- A. pullus – Queensland
- A. purpureicorpus – Queensland
- A. purpureithorax – Queensland
- A. purpureivarius – Queensland
- A. quadrifasciatus – Queensland
- A. quadriguttativentris – Queensland
- A. quadrimaculae – Queensland
- A. quadrimaculatus – Queensland
- A. queenslandensis – Queensland
- A. rieki – Queensland
- A. rotundiventris – Queensland
- A. rufiscutellum – Queensland
- A. saintpierrei – Queensland
  - A parasitoid on various gall midges
- A. saltensis – Queensland
- A. salto – Queensland
- A. saltus – Queensland
- A. sannio – Queensland
- A. sannion – Queensland
- A. schilleri – Queensland
- A. semiflaviceps – Queensland
- A. septemguttatus – Queensland
- A. sexguttatus – Queensland
- A. seymourensis – Queensland
- A. silvarum – Queensland
- A. silvensis – Queensland
- A. speciosissimus – Queensland
- A. speciosus – Queensland
- A. spissigradus – Queensland
- A. subfasciativentris – Queensland
- A. sublustris – Queensland
- A. sulcatus – Queensland
- A. sulfureiventris – Queensland
  - A parasitoid on various gall midges
- A. susurrus – Queensland
- A. tarsatus – Queensland
- A. teiae – Queensland
  - A parasitoid on lymantriid moths of the genus Teia, also recorded on the leaf beetle Galeruca semipullata
- A. tenuis – Queensland
- A. thalesi – Queensland
- A. transversifasciatus – New South Wales
- A. trifasciatus – Queensland
- A. trimaculosus – Queensland
- A. unfasciativentris – Queensland
- A. valens – Tasmania
- A. varicolor – Queensland
- A. verus – Victoria
- A. victoriensis – Victoria
  - A parasitoid on various gall wasps
- A. viridicyaneus – Queensland
- A. viridiflavus – Queensland
- A. viridiscapus – Queensland
- A. viridithorax – Queensland
- A. vivatus – Queensland
- A. wallacei – Queensland
- A. walsinghami – Victoria
- A. xanther – Northern Territory, Queensland
- A. xanthicolor – Queensland
- A. xenares – New South Wales, Tasmania
- A. zaleucus – Tasmania
