= List of Lasioptera species =

This is a list of 146 species in Lasioptera, a genus of gall midges in the family Cecidomyiidae.

== Lasioptera species ==
- Lasioptera abhamata Felt, 1907^{i c g}
- Lasioptera achyranthesae Sharma, 1988^{c g}
- Lasioptera achyranthii Shinji, 1939^{c g}
- Lasioptera aechynomensis (Brethes, 1918)^{c g}
- Lasioptera aeschynanthusperottetti Mani, 1943^{c g}
- Lasioptera annandalei (Mani, 1934)^{c g}
- Lasioptera anonae Tavares, 1908^{c g}
- Lasioptera argentata Loew, 1850^{c g}
- Lasioptera ariasis Skuhrava & Garcia, 2001^{g}
- Lasioptera arizonensis Felt, 1908^{i c g}
- Lasioptera artemisiae Dombrovskaja, 1940^{c g}
- Lasioptera artemisifoliae Shinji, 1939^{c g}
- Lasioptera arundinis Schiner, 1854^{c g}
- Lasioptera astericola Shinji, 1939^{c g}
- Lasioptera asterspinosae White, 1950^{i c g}
- Lasioptera asystasiae Nayar, 1944^{c g}
- Lasioptera aurata Skuse, 1888^{c g}
- Lasioptera auricincta Loew, 1850^{c g}
- Lasioptera azamii Shinji, 1939^{c g}
- Lasioptera basiflava Felt, 1908^{i c g}
- Lasioptera berberina (Schrank, 1781)^{c g}
- Lasioptera berlesiana Paoli, 1907^{c g}
- Lasioptera bothriochloae Rao & Sharma, 1977^{c g}
- Lasioptera bryoniae Schiner, 1868^{c g}
- Lasioptera buhri Möhn, 1968^{c g}
- Lasioptera calamagrostidis Rübsaamen, 1893^{c g}
- Lasioptera callicarpae (Shinji, 1938)^{c}
- Lasioptera camelliae Ohno & Yukawa, 1984^{c g}
- Lasioptera carophila Loew, 1874^{c g}
- Lasioptera caryae Felt, 1907^{i c g}
- Lasioptera centerensis Felt, 1918^{i c g}
- Lasioptera cephalandrae (Mani, 1934)^{c g}
- Lasioptera cerasiphera Stelter, 1990^{c g}
- Lasioptera cerei Rübsaamen, 1905^{c g}
- Lasioptera chichindae (Grover, 1965)^{c g}
- Lasioptera cimicifugae Kovalev, 1967^{c g}
- Lasioptera cinerea Felt, 1907^{i c g}
- Lasioptera clinopodii Kovalev, 1967^{c g}
- Lasioptera collinsonifolia (Beutenmuller, 1908)^{i c g}
- Lasioptera cordobensis Kieffer & Jörgensen, 1910^{c g}
- Lasioptera corni Felt, 1907^{i c g}
- Lasioptera corusca Skuse, 1888^{c g}
- Lasioptera crataevae (Mani, 1934)^{c}
- Lasioptera cratavae (Mani, 1934)^{c g}
- Lasioptera cubitalis Kieffer, 1913^{c g}
- Lasioptera cylindrigallae Felt, 1907^{i c g}
- Lasioptera dioscoreae Kovalev, 1967^{c g}
- Lasioptera dombrovskajae Fedotova & Kovalev, 2005^{c g}
- Lasioptera donacis Coutin & Faivre-Amiot, 1982^{c g}
- Lasioptera ephedrae Cockerell, 1898^{i c g b}
- Lasioptera ephedricola Cockerell, 1902^{i c g}
- Lasioptera eriochloa Felt, 1926^{c g}
- Lasioptera eryngii (Vallot, 1829)^{c g}
- Lasioptera euphobiae Shinji, 1944^{c g}
- Lasioptera excavata Felt, 1907^{i c g}
- Lasioptera falcata Felt, 1919^{c g}
- Lasioptera flavoventris (Felt, 1908)^{i c g}
- Lasioptera fluitans Felt, 1917^{c g}
- Lasioptera foeniculi Dorchin & Freidberg^{g}
- Lasioptera francoisi (Kieffer, 1902)^{c g}
- Lasioptera fructuaria Felt, 1916^{i c g}
- Lasioptera furcata Philippi, 1865^{c g}
- Lasioptera gibaushi Shinji, 1939^{c g}
- Lasioptera graciliforceps Kieffer & Jörgensen, 1910^{c g}
- Lasioptera hamata (Felt, 1907)^{i c g}
- Lasioptera helvipes Skuse, 1888^{c g}
- Lasioptera heterothalami Kieffer & Jörgensen, 1910^{c g}
- Lasioptera hieronymi (Weyenergh, 1875)^{c g}
- Lasioptera howardi Felt, 1921^{i c g}
- Lasioptera humulicaulis Felt, 1907^{i c g}
- Lasioptera hungarica Möhn, 1968^{c g}
- Lasioptera hygrophila Kovalev, 1967^{c g}
- Lasioptera indica Rao, 1952^{c g}
- Lasioptera javanica Kieffer & Leeuwen-Reijnvaan, 1910^{c g}
- Lasioptera kallstroemia Felt, 1935^{i c g}
- Lasioptera kasarzewskella Marikovskij, 1958^{c g}
- Lasioptera koreana Kovalev, 1967^{c g}
- Lasioptera kosarzewskella Marikovskij, 1957^{c g}
- Lasioptera lactucae Felt, 1907^{i c g}
- Lasioptera lespedezae Shinji, 1939^{c g}
- Lasioptera lignicola Schiner, 1868^{c g}
- Lasioptera longipes Kieffer, 1904^{c g}
- Lasioptera longispatha Kieffer, 1909^{c g}
- Lasioptera lonicericola Kovalev, 1967^{c g}
- Lasioptera loyolai Mani, 1986^{c g}
- Lasioptera mangiflorae (Grover, 1968)^{c g}
- Lasioptera manilensis Felt, 1918^{c g}
- Lasioptera mastersi Skuse, 1888^{c g}
- Lasioptera melampyri Möhn, 1968^{c g}
- Lasioptera miscella Skuse, 1888^{c g}
- Lasioptera moliniae Möhn, 1968^{c g}
- Lasioptera monticola Kieffer & Herbst, 1909^{c g}
- Lasioptera nenuae (Grover, 1965)^{c g}
- Lasioptera nigrocincta Kieffer, 1904^{c g}
- Lasioptera nodosae Skuse, 1888^{c g}
- Lasioptera obfuscata (Meigen, 1818)^{c g}
- Lasioptera orientalis Rao, 1956^{c g}
- Lasioptera paederiae (Shinji, 1944)^{c g}
- Lasioptera pallipes Philippi, 1865^{c g}
- Lasioptera paniculi Felt, 1920^{c g}
- Lasioptera parva (Walker, 1848)^{c g}
- Lasioptera piriqueta Felt, 1917^{c g}
- Lasioptera populnea Wachtl, 1883^{c g}
- Lasioptera portulacae Cook, 1911^{c g}
- Lasioptera psederae Felt, 1934^{c g}
- Lasioptera puerariae (Shinji, 1938)^{c g}
- Lasioptera pusilla (Meigen, 1818)^{c g}
- Lasioptera querciflorae Felt, 1908^{i c g}
- Lasioptera querciperda Felt, 1908^{i c g}
- Lasioptera quercirami Felt, 1926^{i c g}
- Lasioptera rubi (Schrank, 1803)^{c g}
- Lasioptera ruebsaameni Möhn, 1968^{c g}
- Lasioptera rufa Kieffer, 1904^{c g}
- Lasioptera serotina Felt, 1908^{i c g}
- Lasioptera solani (Felt, 1907)^{i c g}
- Lasioptera solidaginis Osten Sacken, 1863^{i c g b}
- Lasioptera soongarica Fedotova, 1991^{c g}
- Lasioptera sorghivora (Harris, 1960)^{c g}
- Lasioptera spiraeafolia Felt, 1909^{i c g}
- Lasioptera stelteri Möhn, 1968^{c g}
- Lasioptera tarbagataica Fedotova, 1991^{c g}
- Lasioptera taroiae (Grover, 1965)^{c g}
- Lasioptera terminaliae Tavares, 1908^{c g}
- Lasioptera textor Kieffer, 1905^{c g}
- Lasioptera thuringica Möhn, 1968^{c g}
- Lasioptera tibialis Felt, 1914^{i c g}
- Lasioptera tiliarum Mamaeva, 1964^{c g}
- Lasioptera tomentosae (Grover, 1967)^{c g}
- Lasioptera toombii (Grover, 1962)^{c g}
- Lasioptera tridentifera Kieffer & Jörgensen, 1910^{c g}
- Lasioptera trilobata Kieffer, 1909^{c g}
- Lasioptera tuberosa Kieffer, 1913^{c g}
- Lasioptera turcica Möhn, 1968^{c g}
- Lasioptera ukogi Shinji, 1940^{c g}
- Lasioptera umbelliferarum Kieffer, 1909^{c g}
- Lasioptera uncinata Gagne, 1997^{c g}
- Lasioptera urvilleae Tavares, 1909^{c g}
- Lasioptera ussurica Mamaeva & Kritskaya, 1980^{c g}
- Lasioptera vastatrix Skuse, 1888^{c g}
- Lasioptera ventralis Say, 1824^{i c g}
- Lasioptera viburni Felt, 1907^{i c g}
- Lasioptera virgata Skuse, 1890^{c g}
- Lasioptera vitis Osten Sacken, 1862^{i c g b}
- Lasioptera wildi Skuse, 1890^{c g}
- Lasioptera yadokariae Yukawa & Haitsuka, 1994^{c g}
- Lasioptera ziziae Felt, 1908^{i c g}

Data sources: i = ITIS, c = Catalogue of Life, g = GBIF, b = Bugguide.net
