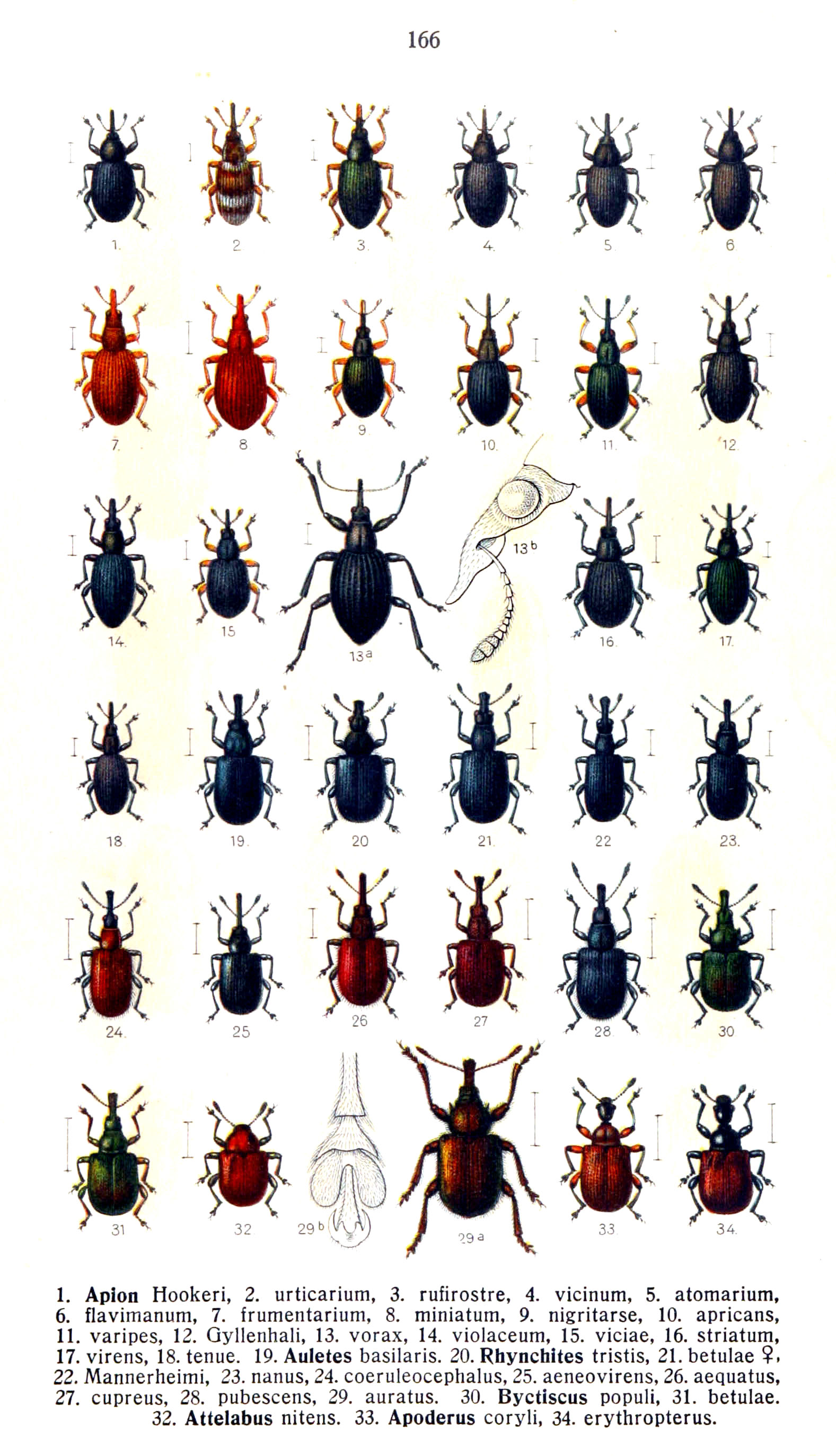

Scientific classification
- Domain: Eukaryota
- Kingdom: Animalia
- Phylum: Arthropoda
- Class: Insecta
- Order: Coleoptera
- Suborder: Polyphaga
- Infraorder: Cucujiformia
- Family: Brentidae
- Genus: Apion
- Species: A. rufirostre

Binomial name
- Apion rufirostre (Fabricius, 1775)

= Apion rufirostre =

Species of beetle

Apion rufirostre is a species of seed weevils native to Europe.
