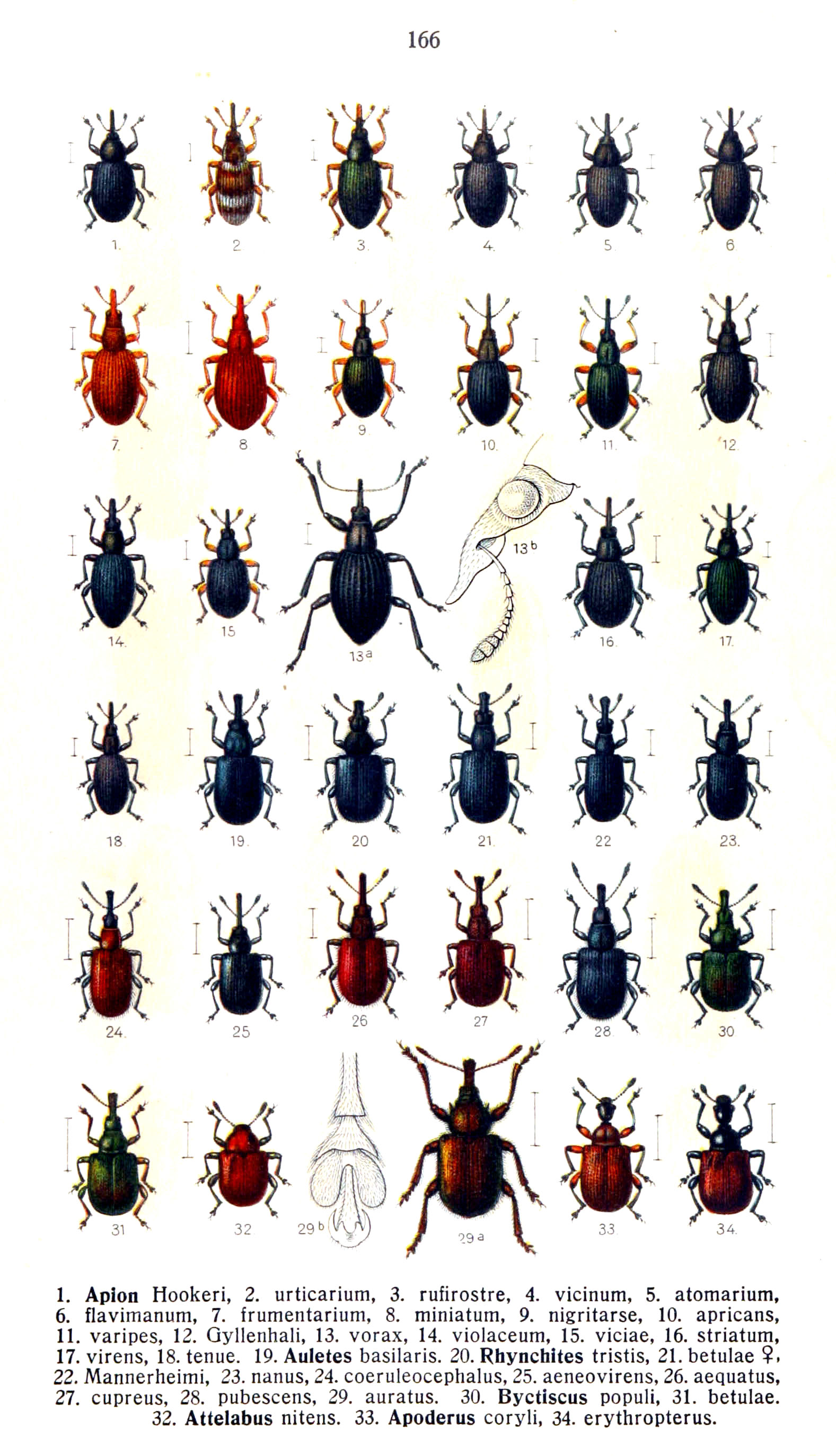

Scientific classification
- Kingdom: Animalia
- Phylum: Arthropoda
- Clade: Pancrustacea
- Class: Insecta
- Order: Coleoptera
- Suborder: Polyphaga
- Infraorder: Cucujiformia
- Superfamily: Curculionoidea
- Family: Brentidae
- Genus: Apion
- Species: A. viciae

Binomial name
- Apion viciae (Paykull, 1800)

= Apion viciae =

Species of beetle

Apion viciae is a species of seed weevils native to Europe.
