= Olliffiella cristicola =

Scientific classification
- Domain: Eukaryota
- Kingdom: Animalia
- Phylum: Arthropoda
- Class: Insecta
- Order: Hemiptera
- Suborder: Sternorrhyncha
- Family: Kermesidae
- Genus: Olliffiella
- Species: O. cristicola

Binomial name
- Olliffiella cristicola Cockerell, 1896

Species of true bug

Olliffiella cristicola, the gall kermes, is a species of gall-like scale insect in the family Kermesidae.
