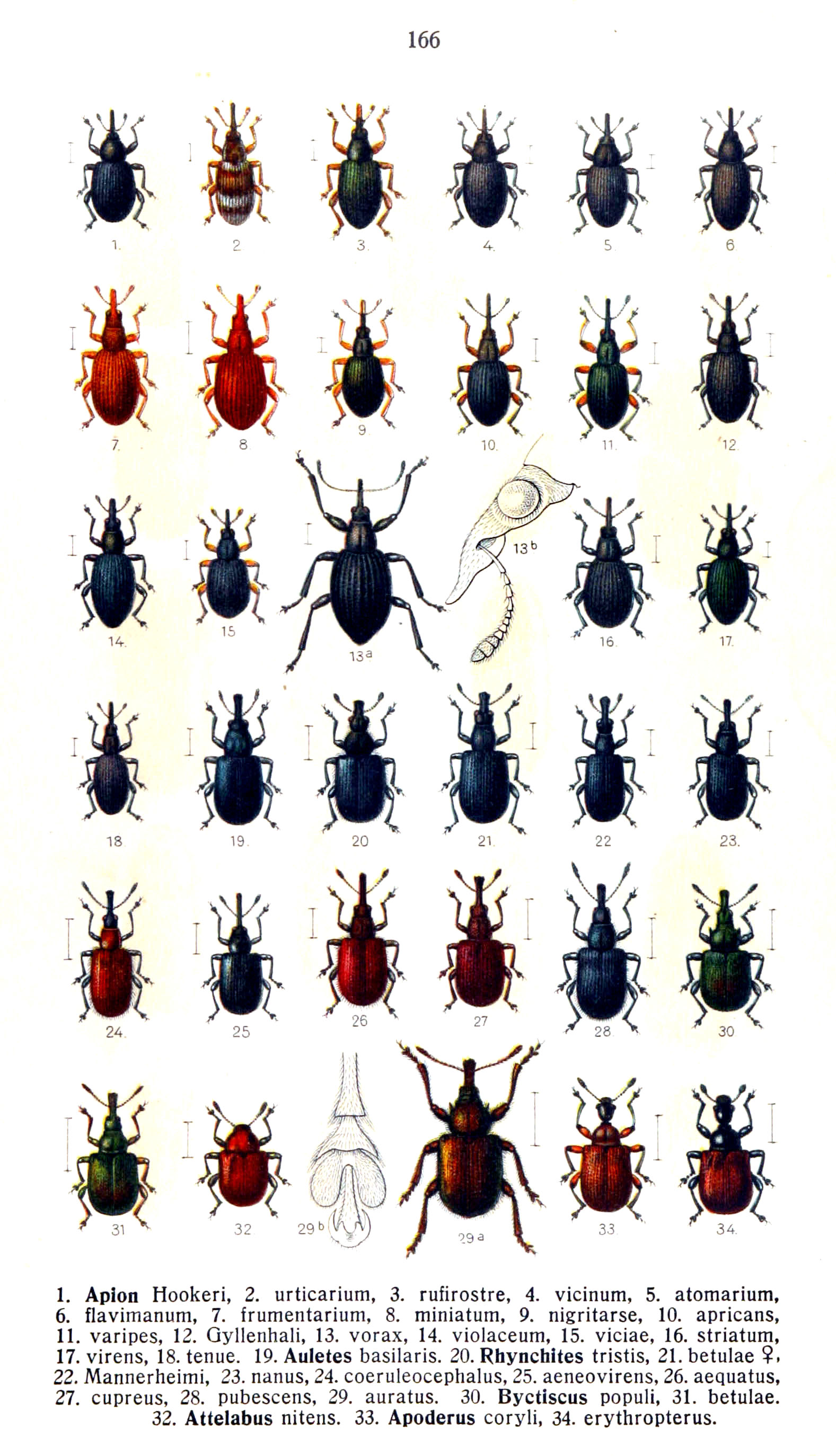

Scientific classification
- Domain: Eukaryota
- Kingdom: Animalia
- Phylum: Arthropoda
- Class: Insecta
- Order: Coleoptera
- Suborder: Polyphaga
- Infraorder: Cucujiformia
- Family: Brentidae
- Genus: Apion
- Species: A. violaceum

Binomial name
- Apion violaceum Kirby, 1808 )

= Apion violaceum =

Species of beetle

Apion violaceum is a species of seed weevils native to Europe.
