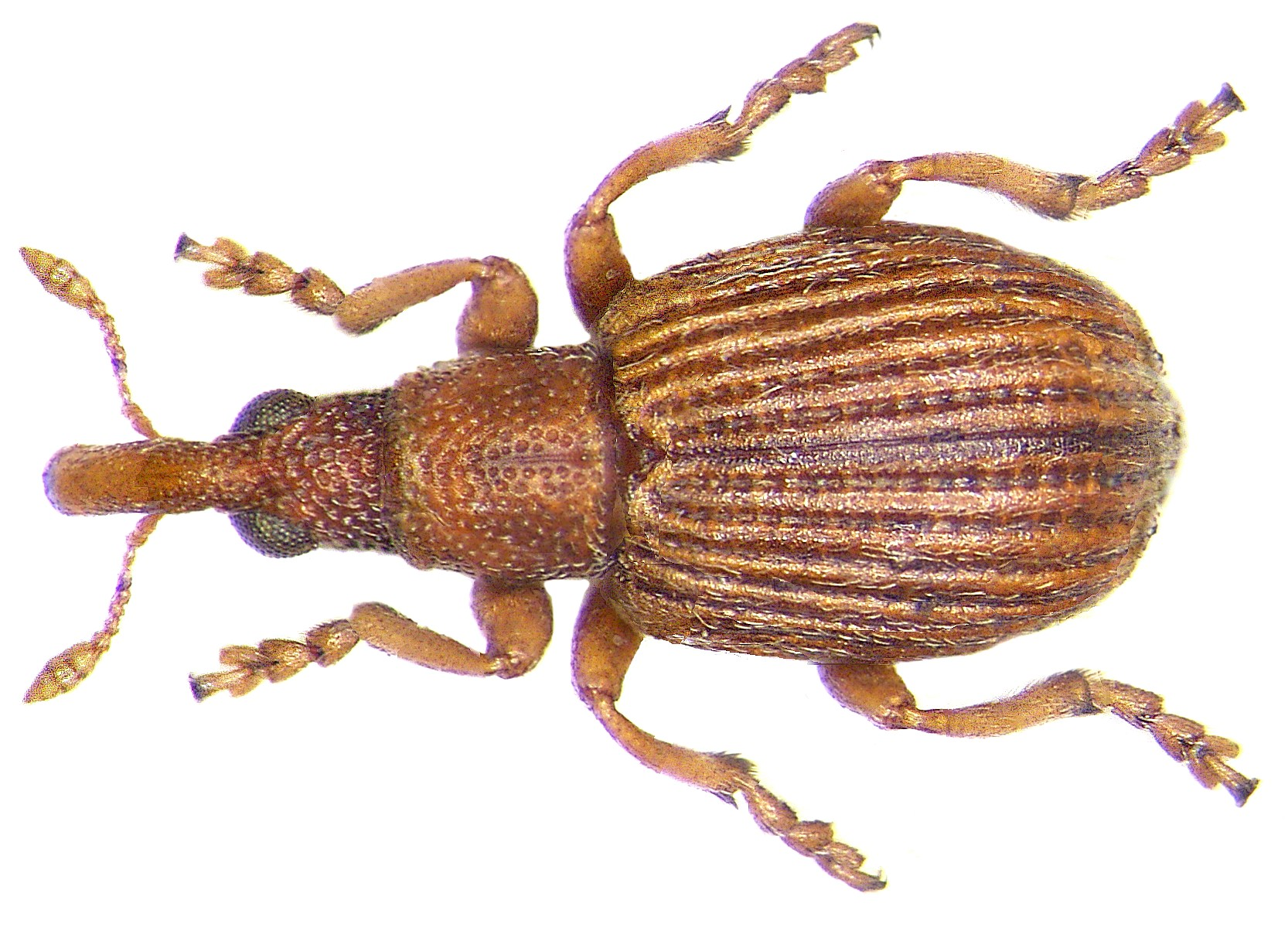
- 2.4-3.6 mm

Scientific classification
- Domain: Eukaryota
- Kingdom: Animalia
- Phylum: Arthropoda
- Class: Insecta
- Order: Coleoptera
- Suborder: Polyphaga
- Infraorder: Cucujiformia
- Family: Brentidae
- Genus: Apion
- Species: A. cruentatum

Binomial name
- Apion cruentatum Walton, 1844

= Apion cruentatum =

Species of beetle

Apion cruentatum is a species of beetle in the family Brentidae. It is found in the Palearctic.
