= Aprostocetus sensuna =

Scientific classification
- Domain: Eukaryota
- Kingdom: Animalia
- Phylum: Arthropoda
- Class: Insecta
- Order: Hymenoptera
- Family: Eulophidae
- Subfamily: Tetrastichinae
- Tribe: Tetrastichini
- Genus: Aprostocetus
- Species: A. sensuna

Binomial name
- Aprostocetus sensuna Baur, 1994

Species of wasp

Aprostocetus sensuna is a species of chalcid wasp belonging to the family Eulophidae. It is only known from close to the Sense River near Bern in Switzerland.

Up to 2.25 mm in length, this species can be distinguished from its nearest congeners by its generally black, non-metallic body coloration and long, prominent hypopygium (process at end of abdomen). The specific name sensuna is taken from the ancient name of the river where it was first recorded.

The breeding ecology of the species is unknown.
