= Lasioptera vitis =

Scientific classification
- Domain: Eukaryota
- Kingdom: Animalia
- Phylum: Arthropoda
- Class: Insecta
- Order: Diptera
- Family: Cecidomyiidae
- Genus: Lasioptera
- Species: L. vitis

Binomial name
- Lasioptera vitis Osten Sacken, 1862

Species of fly

Lasioptera vitis is a species of gall midges in the family Cecidomyiidae.
