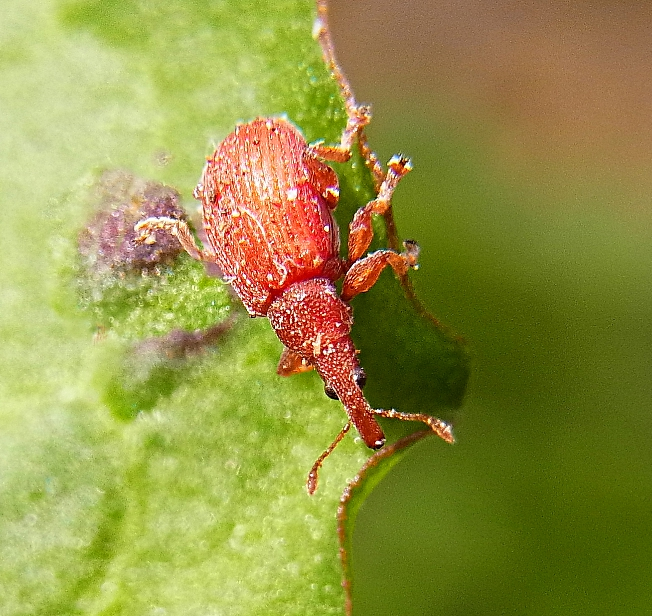

Scientific classification
- Kingdom: Animalia
- Phylum: Arthropoda
- Class: Insecta
- Order: Coleoptera
- Suborder: Polyphaga
- Infraorder: Cucujiformia
- Family: Brentidae
- Genus: Apion
- Species: A. frumentarium

Binomial name
- Apion frumentarium (Linnaeus, 1758)

= Apion frumentarium =

Species of beetle

Apion frumentarium is a species of beetle in family Brentidae. It is found in the Palearctic.
