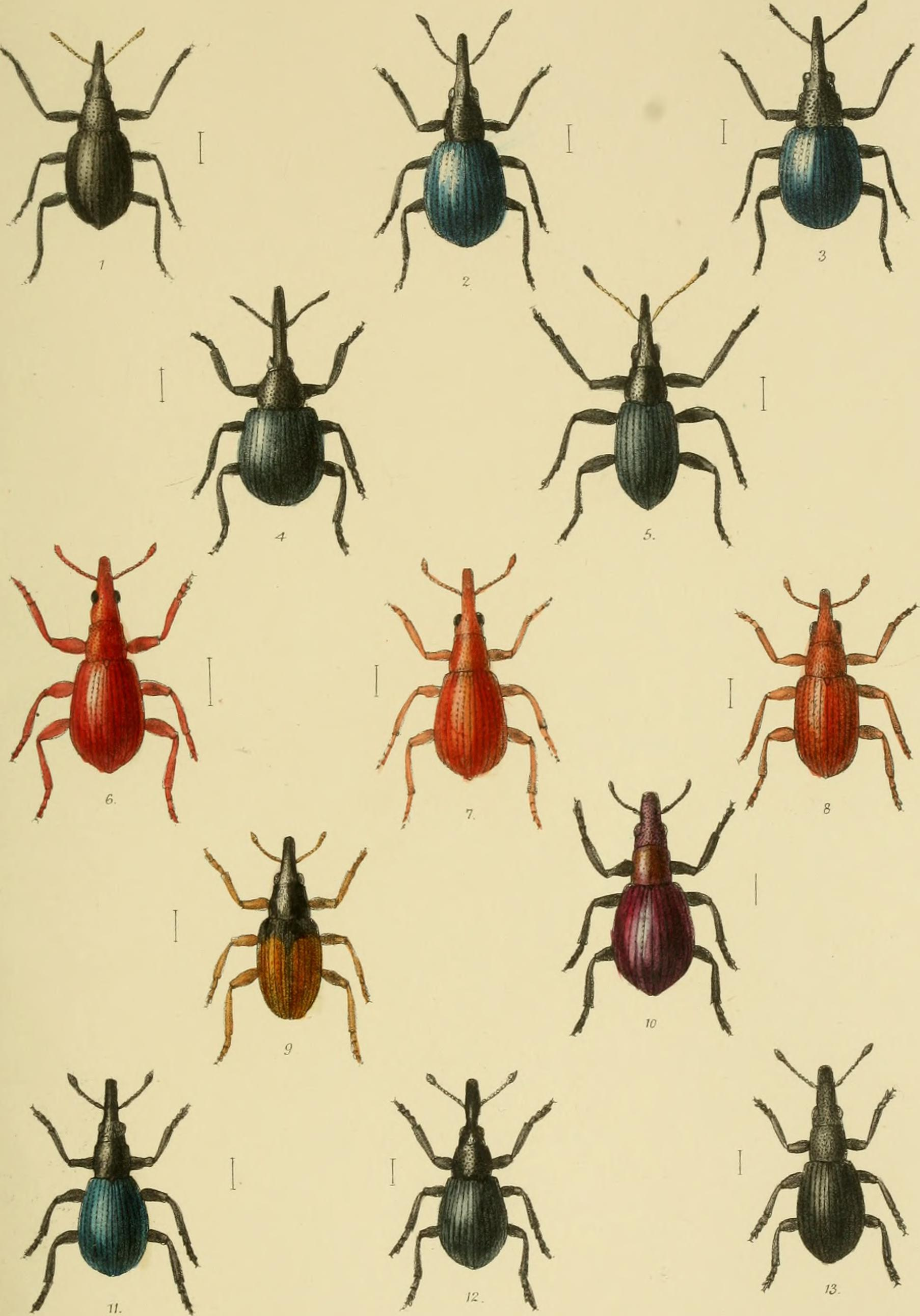

Scientific classification
- Kingdom: Animalia
- Phylum: Arthropoda
- Class: Insecta
- Order: Coleoptera
- Suborder: Polyphaga
- Infraorder: Cucujiformia
- Family: Brentidae
- Genus: Apion
- Species: A. rubens

Binomial name
- Apion rubens Stephens, 1839

= Apion rubens =

Species of beetle

Apion rubens is a species of seed weevil native to Europe. It is associated with Rumex acetosella.
