= Aprostocetus hagenowii =

Scientific classification
- Domain: Eukaryota
- Kingdom: Animalia
- Phylum: Arthropoda
- Class: Insecta
- Order: Hymenoptera
- Family: Eulophidae
- Genus: Aprostocetus
- Species: A. hagenowii

Binomial name
- Aprostocetus hagenowii (Ratzeburg, 1852)

Synonyms
- Entedon hagenowii

Species of wasp

Aprostocetus hagenowii is a species of parasitoid wasp. It is a parasitoid of cockroach oothecae.
