= Nidularia (insect) =

Scientific classification
- Kingdom: Animalia
- Phylum: Arthropoda
- Class: Insecta
- Order: Hemiptera
- Suborder: Sternorrhyncha
- Family: Kermesidae
- Genus: Nidularia; Cockerell

Species
- See text

Genus of true bugs

Nidularia is a genus of gall-like scale insects in the family Kermesidae. There are three described species in Nidularia.

== Species ==
These three species belong to the genus Nidularia:

- Nidularia balachowskii Bodenheimer, 1941
- Nidularia japonica Kuwana, 1918
- Nidularia pulvinata (Planchon, 1864)
