= Lasioptera ephedrae =

Scientific classification
- Domain: Eukaryota
- Kingdom: Animalia
- Phylum: Arthropoda
- Class: Insecta
- Order: Diptera
- Family: Cecidomyiidae
- Genus: Lasioptera
- Species: L. ephedrae

Binomial name
- Lasioptera ephedrae Cockerell, 1898

Species of fly

Lasioptera ephedrae is a species of gall midges in the family Cecidomyiidae. It forms galls on Ephedra trifurca stems.
