= Olliffiella =

Scientific classification
- Domain: Eukaryota
- Kingdom: Animalia
- Phylum: Arthropoda
- Class: Insecta
- Order: Hemiptera
- Suborder: Sternorrhyncha
- Family: Kermesidae
- Genus: Olliffiella; Cockerell

Genus of true bugs

Olliffiella is a genus of gall-like scale insects in the family Kermesidae. There are at least two described species in Olliffiella.

== Species ==
These two species belong to the genus Olliffiella:

- Olliffiella cristicola Cockerell, 1896 (gall kermes)
- Olliffiella secunda Ferris, 1955
