= Lasioptera solidaginis =

Scientific classification
- Domain: Eukaryota
- Kingdom: Animalia
- Phylum: Arthropoda
- Class: Insecta
- Order: Diptera
- Family: Cecidomyiidae
- Genus: Lasioptera
- Species: L. solidaginis

Binomial name
- Lasioptera solidaginis Osten Sacken, 1863

Synonyms
- Lasioptera dorsimaculata Felt, 1908

Species of fly

Lasioptera solidaginis is a species of gall midges in the family Cecidomyiidae.
