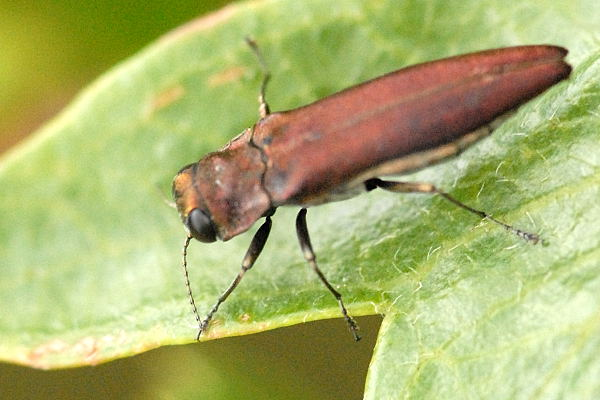

Scientific classification
- Kingdom: Animalia
- Phylum: Arthropoda
- Clade: Pancrustacea
- Class: Insecta
- Order: Coleoptera
- Suborder: Polyphaga
- Infraorder: Elateriformia
- Family: Buprestidae
- Genus: Agrilus
- Species: A. sinuatus

Binomial name
- Agrilus sinuatus (Olivier, 1790)

= Agrilus sinuatus =

Species of beetle

Agrilus sinuatus, known generally as the sinuate peartree borer or hawthorn jewel beetle, is a species of metallic wood-boring beetle in the family Buprestidae. It is found in Europe and Northern Asia (excluding China) and North America.

== Subspecies ==
These two subspecies belong to the species Agrilus sinuatus:

- Agrilus sinuatus sinuatus (Olivier, 1790)
- Agrilus sinuatus yokoyamai Iga, 1955
