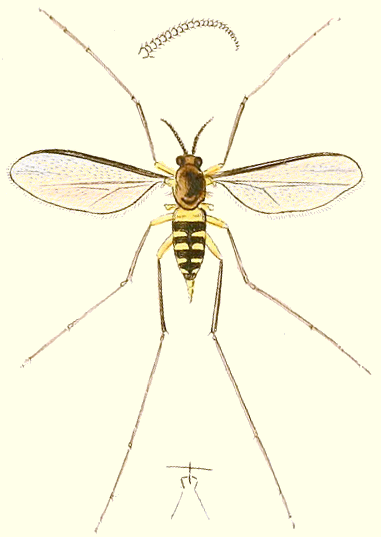

Scientific classification
- Kingdom: Animalia
- Phylum: Arthropoda
- Class: Insecta
- Order: Diptera
- Family: Cecidomyiidae
- Genus: Lasioptera
- Species: L. rubi

Binomial name
- Lasioptera rubi (Schrank, 1803)

Synonyms
- Tipula rubi Schrank, 1803

= Lasioptera rubi =

Species of fly

Lasioptera rubi (also known as the raspberry gall midge) is a species of gall midge in the family Cecidomyiidae and is found in Europe. It was first described in 1803 by the German priest, botanist and entomologist, Franz von Paula Schrank. The larvae feed within the tissue of brambles, creating abnormal plant growths known as galls.

== Description ==
In the early summer the gall midge lays a cluster of up to forty eggs in young bramble shoots. Rapid cell growth of the tissue creates a rounded swelling of 5 x 2 cm in the stem, which sometimes has longitudinal fissures, and contains several irregular cavities with larvae. The cavities are lined with fungal mycelium on which the larvae feed. When young the larvae are white, and later in the summer and winter are orange-red. Usually the gall develops on one side of the shoot, but occasionally spreads to the other side. Initially the gall is green, but changes to reddish-brown as it matures. Larvae pupate the following spring and the adults emerge in the spring. Sometimes the gall is in a leaf petiole.

Lasioptera rubi galls have been found on the following species;

- Rubus caesius – European dewberry
- Rubus canescens
- Rubus gillotii
- Rubus grabowskii
- Rubus idaeus – raspberry
- Rubus nessensis
- Rubus fruticosus – blackberry
- Rubus plicatus
- Rubus praecox
- Rubus ulmifolius – elmleaf blackberry

Similar species

Galls of the gall wasp, Diastrophus rubi, are elongate (2–15 cm long and circa 1 cm wide) compared with the gall of Lasioptera rubi, which is rounded (5 x 2 cm).

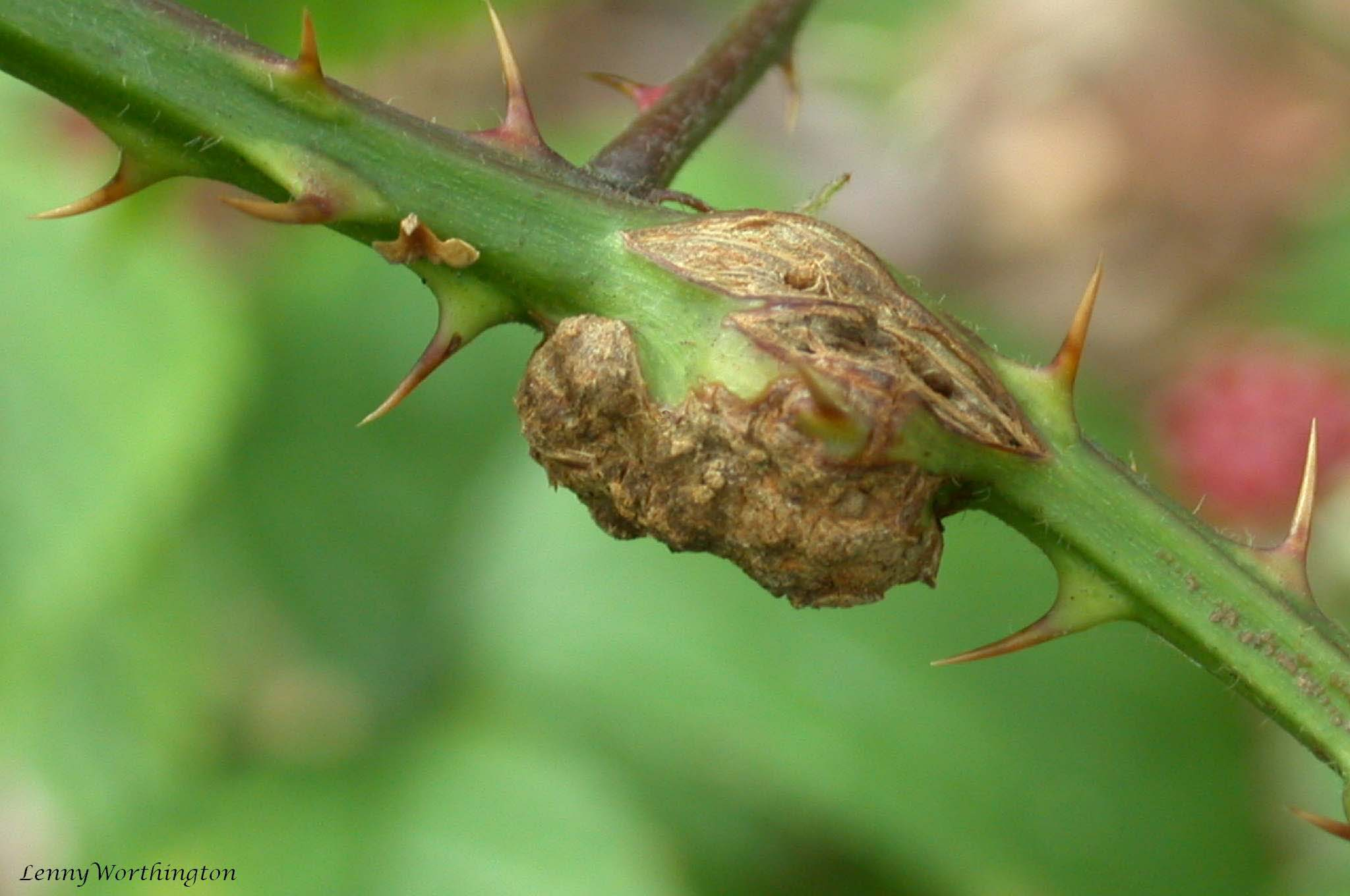
Lasioptera rubi gall

== Distribution ==
The fly has been recorded in 24 European countries, from Ireland. France and Spain in the west, to Finland, Ukraine and Russia in the east.
