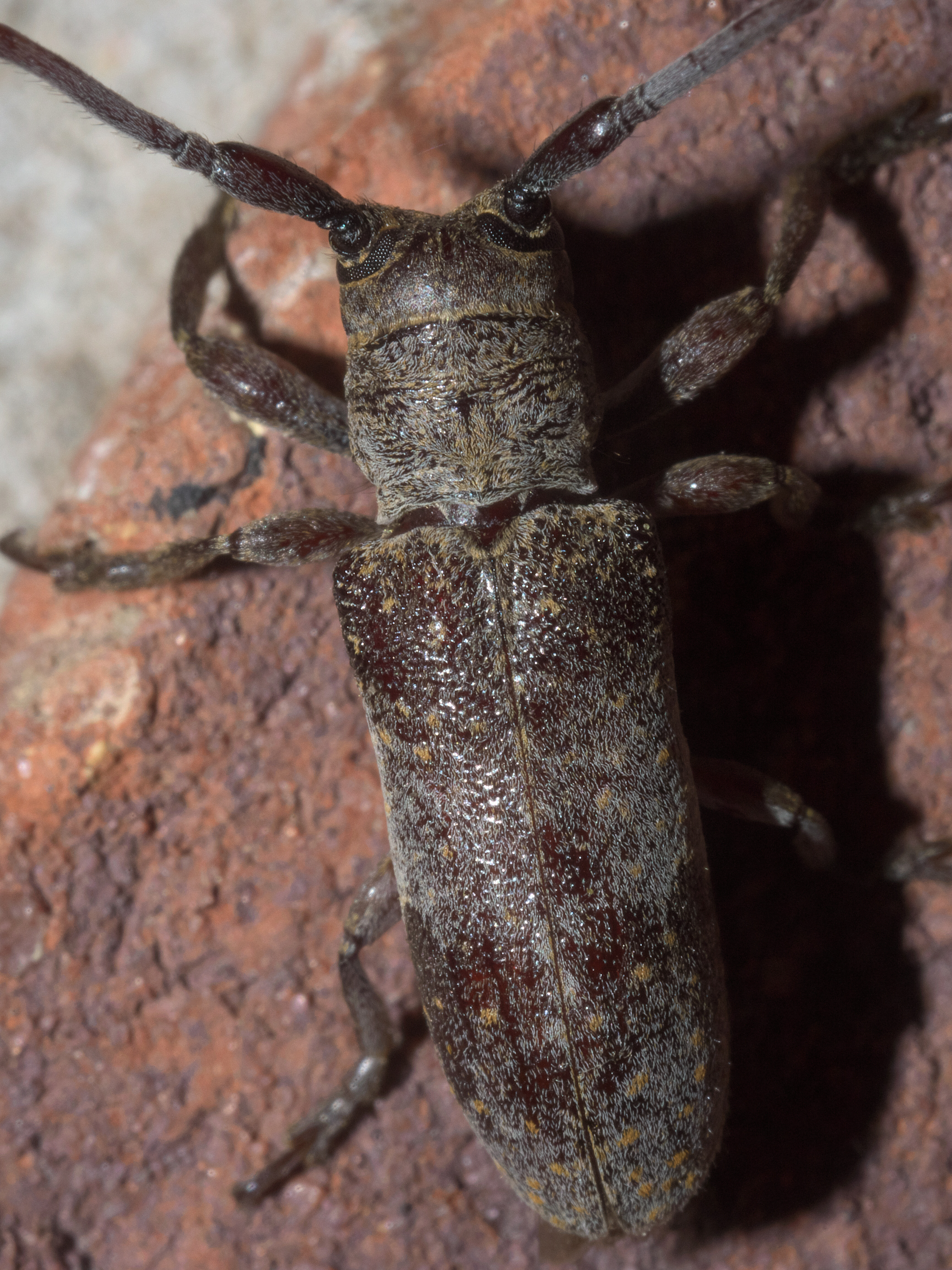

Scientific classification
- Kingdom: Animalia
- Phylum: Arthropoda
- Class: Insecta
- Order: Coleoptera
- Suborder: Polyphaga
- Infraorder: Cucujiformia
- Family: Cerambycidae
- Genus: Oncideres
- Species: O. cingulata

Binomial name
- Oncideres cingulata (Say, 1826)

= Oncideres cingulata =

Species of beetle

Oncideres cingulata, the twig girdler, is a brownish-gray beetle, typically 1/2 to 5/8 inch (13 to 16 mm) in length, in the longhorn beetle family. It is characterized by long antennae, 1/2 to 1 inch (13 to 25 mm) long.

== Distribution ==
The species is found in Eastern and Gulf Coast of the United States.

== Ecology ==
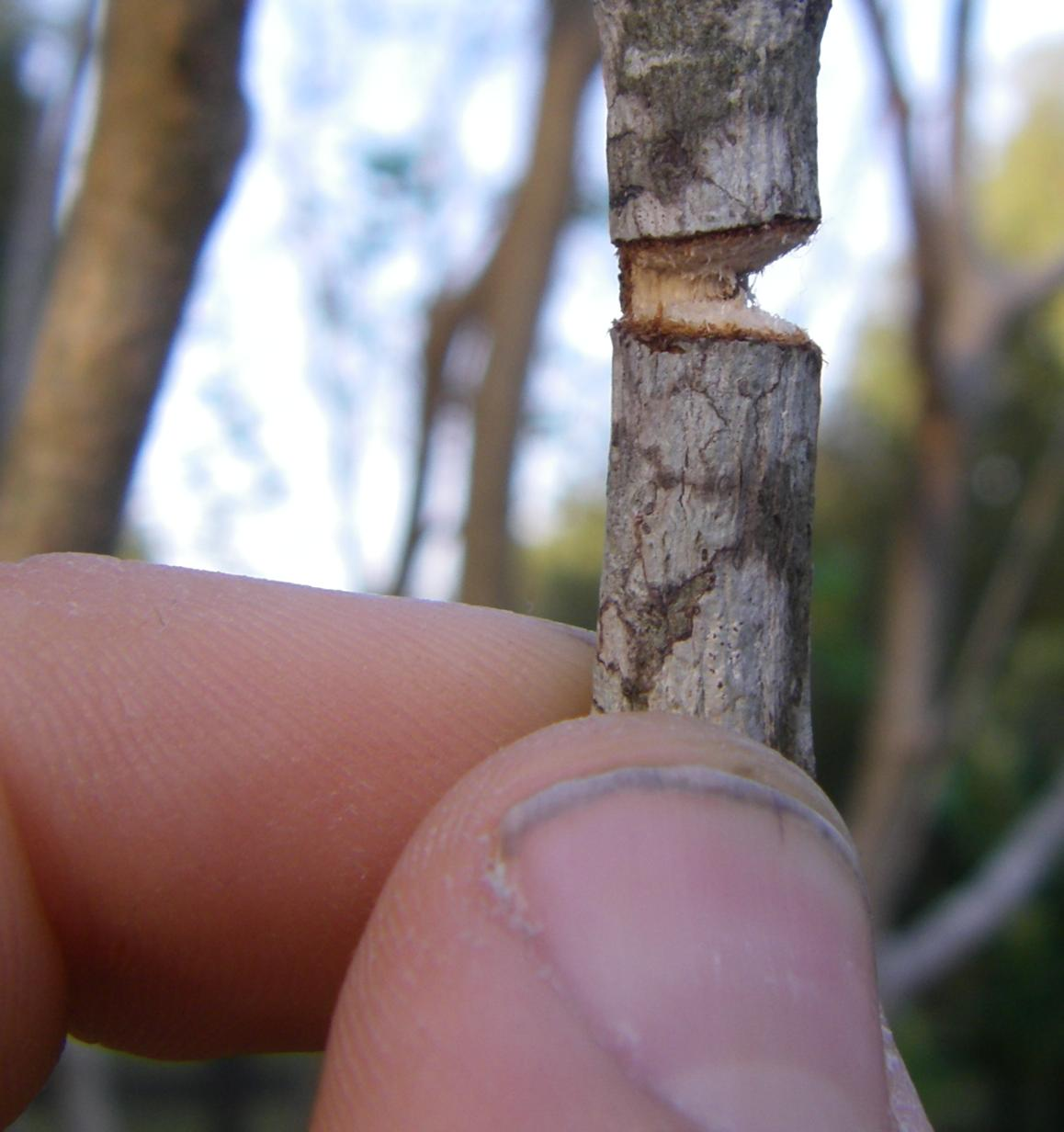
Girdled pecan twig

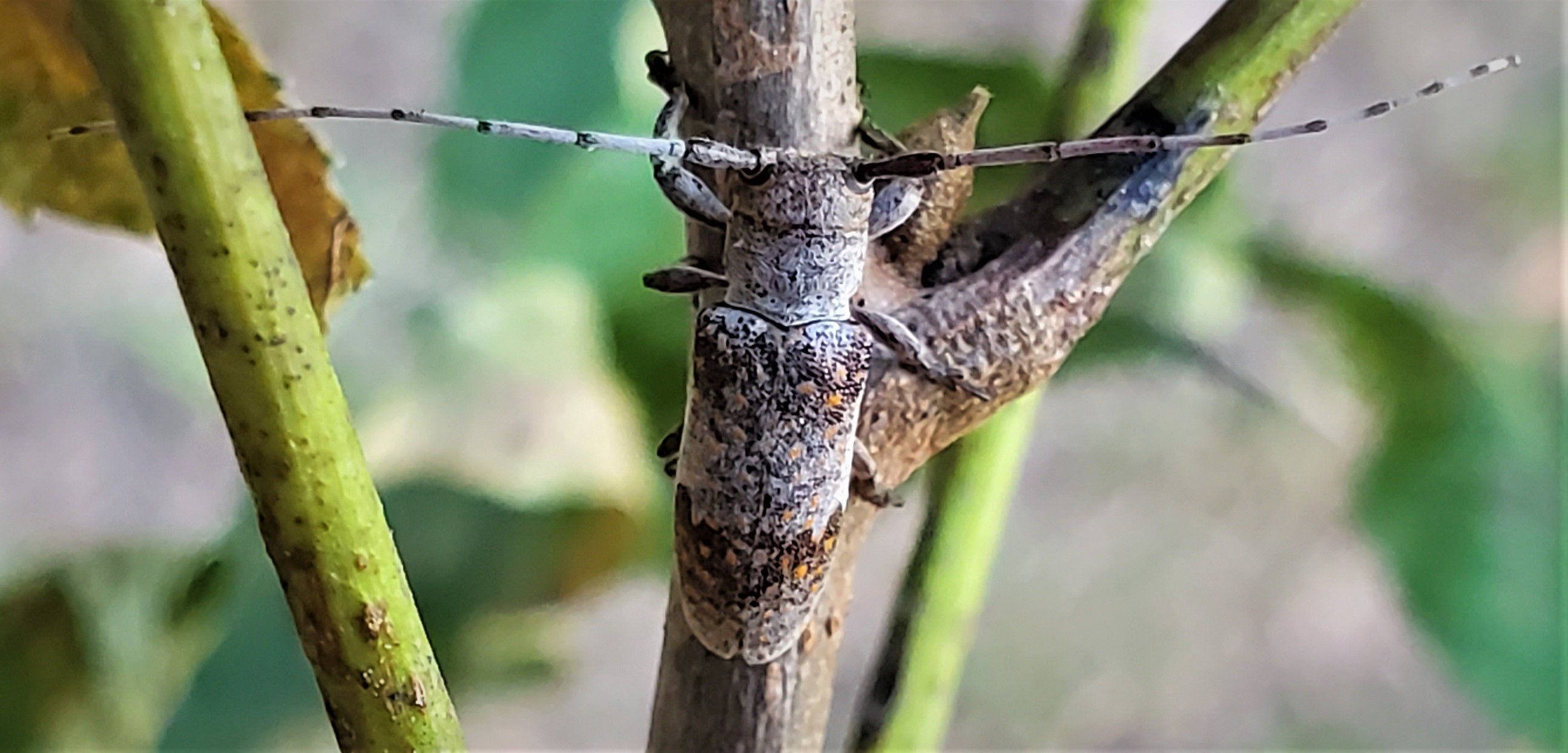
Twig girdler on pecan twig

This beetle is widely known for the damage it causes to pecan plantations, but also to lumber trees such as hickory, oak, poplar and elm as well as various fruit trees. In late summer and fall, the adult female girdles small branches, 1/4-to-1/2-inch (6.4 to 12.7 mm) diameter, with its mandibles, cutting through the bark and into the wood. The resulting effect looks almost as if it were cut with a small saw. The female lays her eggs singularly in a separate cut into the wood, above the girdled section. Shortly after the twig is girdled and inserted with eggs, it will die and fall from the tree to the ground. The white, legless larva overwinters in the twig, then eats its way through woody tissue to the girdled point in the dead twig, and eventually closes itself in the twig with shredded wood fibers, then pupates over 12 to 14 days. The adult emerges and mates in the summer, feeding off tender woody shoots. This concludes the beetle's single yearly generation.

Twig girdlers create a difficult infestation in plantations, as they occur late in the season close to nut harvesting. Collecting and burning dead twigs during the winter is key to fighting infestations. They can result in significant crop decreases in the following year, and can also result in the structural problems inherent to inexpert pruning.
