= Dasineura trifolii =

Scientific classification
- Domain: Eukaryota
- Kingdom: Animalia
- Phylum: Arthropoda
- Class: Insecta
- Order: Diptera
- Family: Cecidomyiidae
- Genus: Dasineura
- Species: D. trifolii

Binomial name
- Dasineura trifolii Loew, 1874

Species of fly

Dasineura trifolii, the clover leaf midge, is a species of gall midges, insects in the family Cecidomyiidae.
