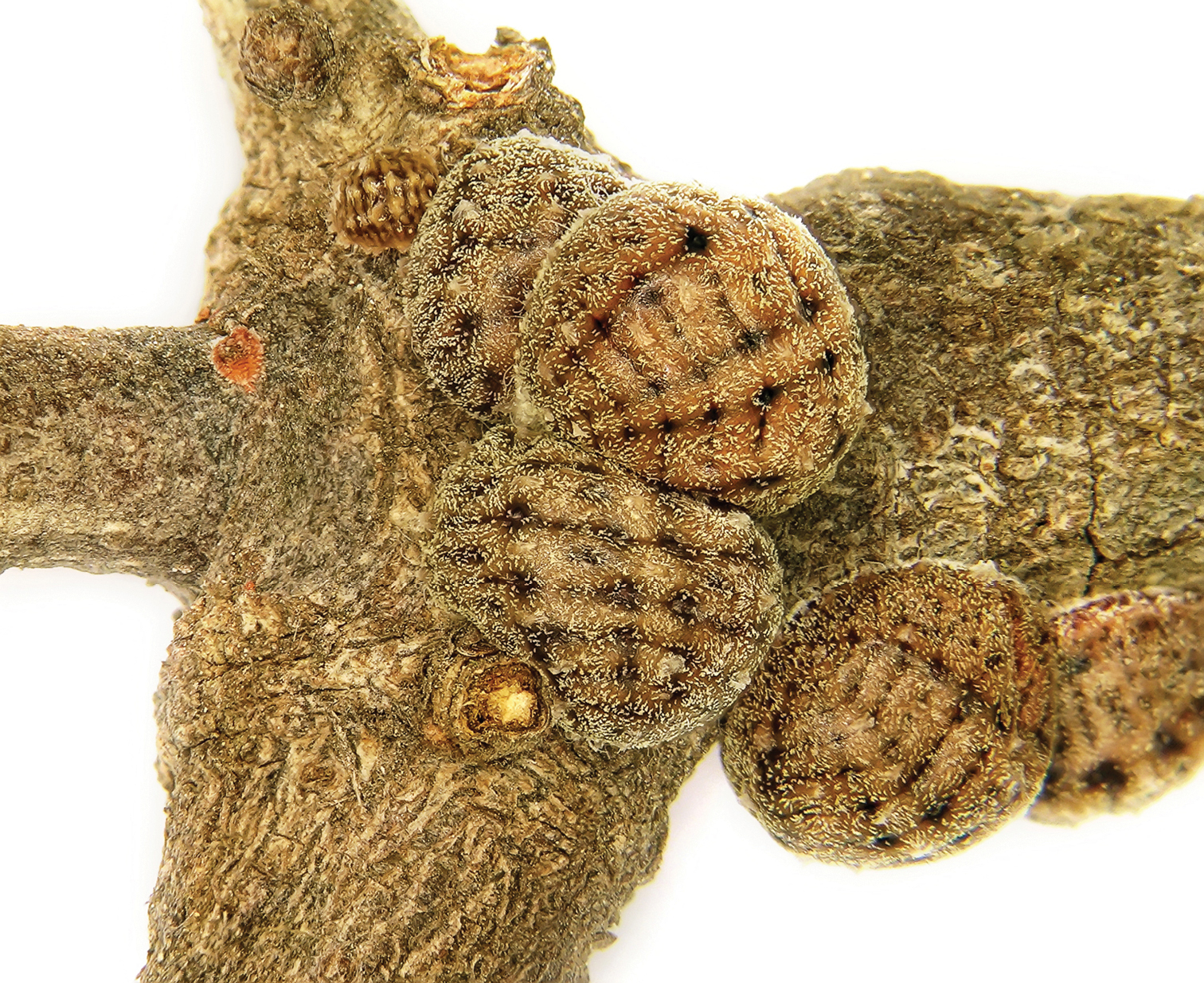
- Kermes echinatus mature reproductive females
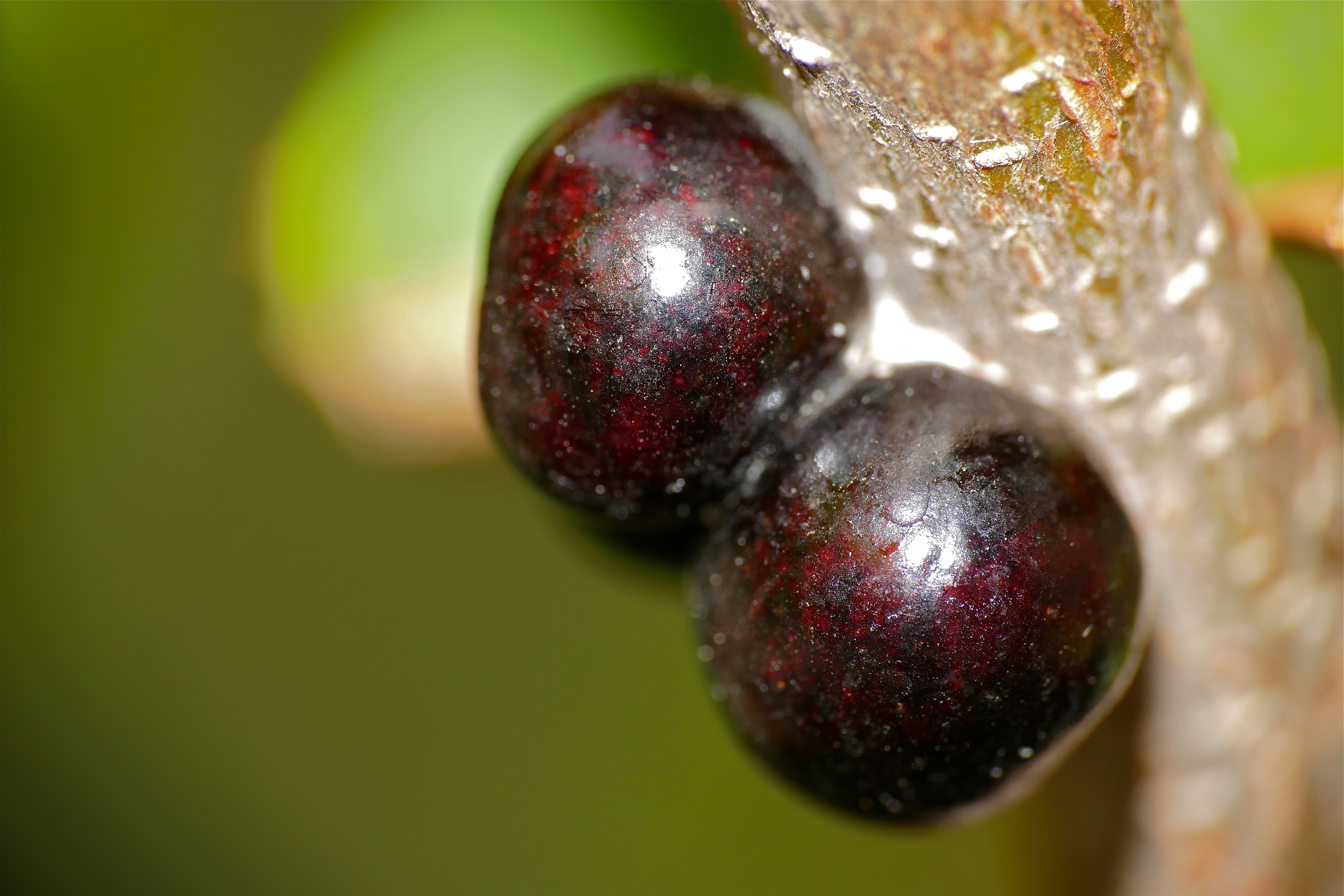
- Kermes ilicis mature reproductive females on holm oak

Scientific classification
- Kingdom: Animalia
- Phylum: Arthropoda
- Clade: Pancrustacea
- Class: Insecta
- Order: Hemiptera
- Suborder: Sternorrhyncha
- Family: Kermesidae
- Genus: Kermes; Latreille, 1798

Species
- See text

= Kermes (insect) =

Genus of gall-like scale insects

Kermes is a genus of gall-like scale insects in the family Kermesidae. They feed on the sap of oaks; the females produce a red dye, also called "kermes", that is the source of natural crimson. The word "kermes" is derived from Turkish qırmız or kırmızı (قرمز), "crimson" (both the colour and the dyestuff), itself deriving from Persian *کرمست (*kermest) via Proto-Indo-Iranian *kŕ̥miš, from Proto-Indo-European *kʷŕ̥mis (“worm”); it is related to the Persian word for worm کرم kirm.

The first instars are called "crawlers". They are less than 0.5 millimetres (0.020 in) long, salmon-colored, and wingless with well-developed legs. As adults, they demonstrate significant sexual dimorphism. Males are gnat-like with fragile wings, while females are bulbous with reduced legs and antennas, and are easily mistaken for buds or galls.

There are some 20 species, including:

- Kermes bacciformis Leonardi, 1908
- Kermes corticalis (Nassonov, 1908)
- Kermes echinatus (Balachowsky, 1953)
- Kermes gibbosus Signoret, 1875
- Kermes ilicis (Linnaeus, 1758)
- Kermes roboris (Fourcroy, 1785)
- Kermes vermilio Planchon, 1864
