= Stictococcidae =

Scientific classification
- Domain: Eukaryota
- Kingdom: Animalia
- Phylum: Arthropoda
- Class: Insecta
- Order: Hemiptera
- Suborder: Sternorrhyncha
- Infraorder: Coccomorpha
- Superfamily: Coccoidea
- Family: Stictococcidae; Lindinger, 1913

Genera
- See text

Family of true bugs

Stictococcidae is a family of scale insects commonly known as stictococcids. There are three genera containing about seventeen species and members of this family are found only in Afrotropical regions.

== Hosts ==
Members of this family have been recorded on thirty-eight different plant families, including various agricultural crops, but are most common on plants in the families, Annonaceae, Euphorbiaceae, Fabaceae and Sterculiaceae.

== Description ==
Adult female stictococcids are similar in appearance to soft scales in the family Coccidae. They are nearly circular, flattened dorsally and have turned up margins. The segments are conspicuous, particularly near the rim. There are small, pale coloured legs and antennae on the underside. The body is covered in setae which are longer at the periphery.

== Life cycle ==
Stictococcids have three female instars and five male instars. The first instars are sexually dimorphic, with the females having the anus in the center of the body and having well-developed mouthparts, whereas the males have the anus near the posterior end of the body and have no mouthparts. Most species are associated with ants who feed on the honeydew they produce.

== Genera ==
- Hockiana
- Parastictococcus
- Stictococcus
