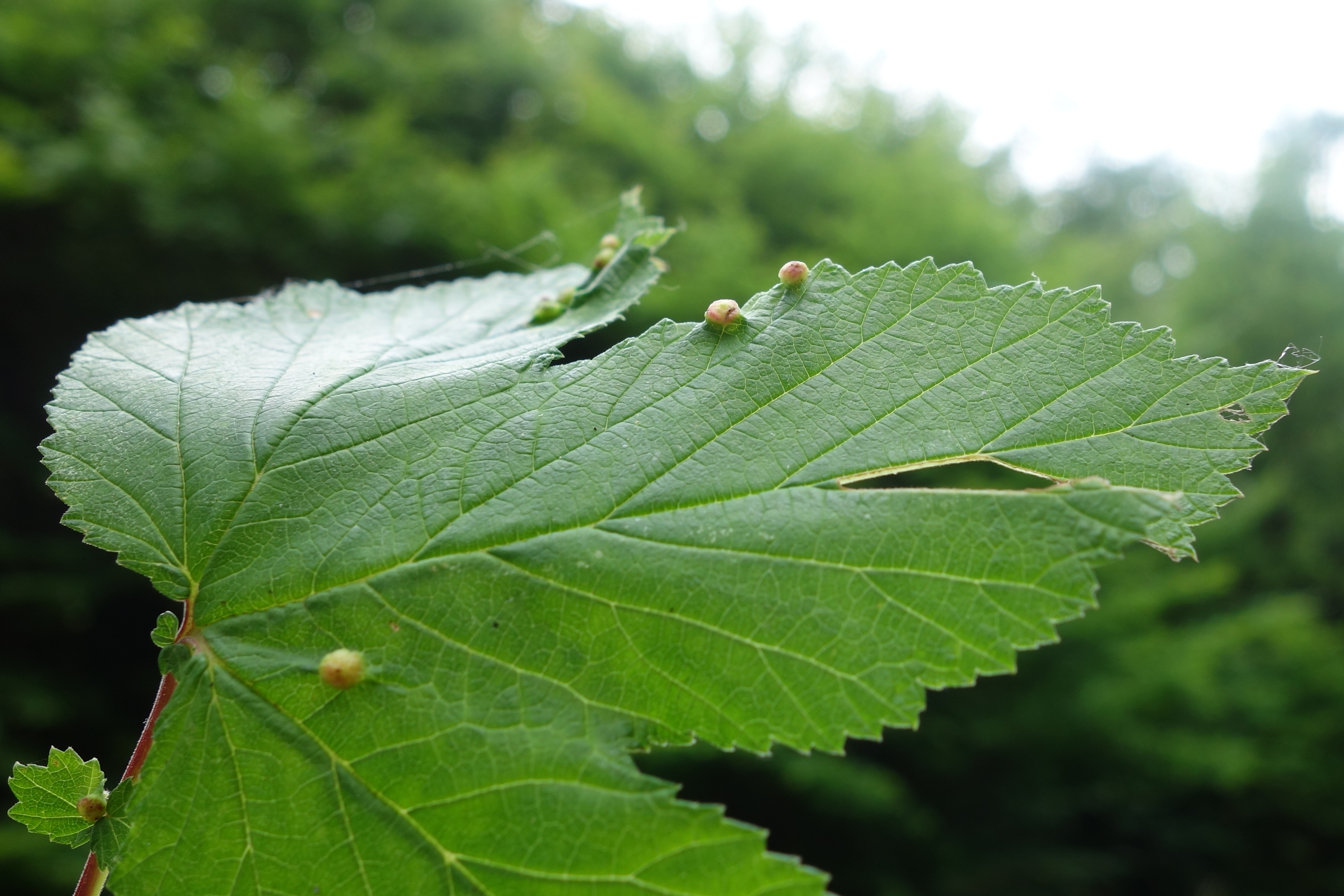
- Dasineura ulmaria gall on Filipendula ulmaria

Scientific classification
- Kingdom: Animalia
- Phylum: Arthropoda
- Class: Insecta
- Order: Diptera
- Family: Cecidomyiidae
- Genus: Dasineura
- Species: D. ulmaria

Binomial name
- Dasineura ulmaria (Bremi, 1847)

= Dasineura ulmaria =

Species of fly

Dasineura ulmaria is a species of fly in the family Cecidomyiidae found in the Palearctic.
