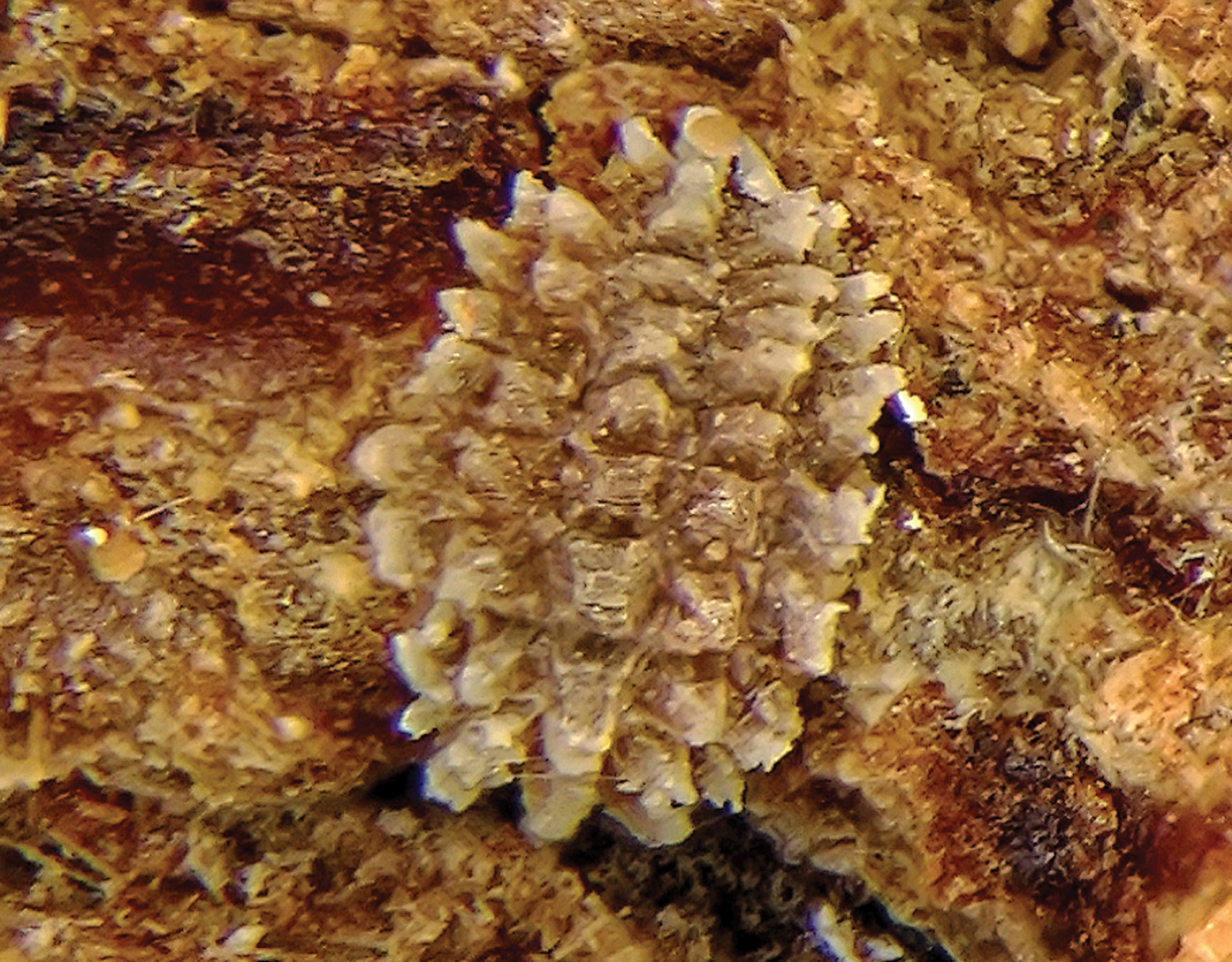
- Nidularia balachowskii

Scientific classification
- Kingdom: Animalia
- Phylum: Arthropoda
- Clade: Pancrustacea
- Class: Insecta
- Order: Hemiptera
- Suborder: Sternorrhyncha
- Superfamily: Coccoidea
- Family: Kermesidae

Genera
- See text

= Kermesidae =

Family of true bugs

The Kermesidae, or gall-like scales, are a family of scale insects belonging to the superfamily Coccoidea. The type genus, Kermes, includes the kermes scale insects, from which a red dye, also called kermes (a.k.a. crimson), is obtained. The family includes about 100 species in 10 genera found in the Nearctic, Indomalayan and Palaearctic realms.

The first instars of some species in the USA are called "crawlers". They are less than 0.5 millimetres (0.020 in) long, salmon-colored, and wingless with well-developed legs. As adults, they demonstrate significant sexual dimorphism. Males are gnat-like with fragile wings, while females are bulbous with reduced legs and antennas, and are easily mistaken for buds or galls.

== Genera ==
These genera belong to the Kermesidae:

- Allokermes Bullington & Kosztarab, 1985
- Eriokermes Miller & Miller, 1993
- Fulbrightia Ferris, 1950
- Kermes Latreille, 1798
- Nanokermes Bullington & Kosztarab, 1985
- Nidularia Targioni-Tozzetti, 1868
- Olliffiella Cockerell, 1896
- Physeriococcus Borchsenius, 1959
- Reynvaania Reynvaania Reyne, 1954
- Sucinikermes Sucinikermes Koteja, 1988
