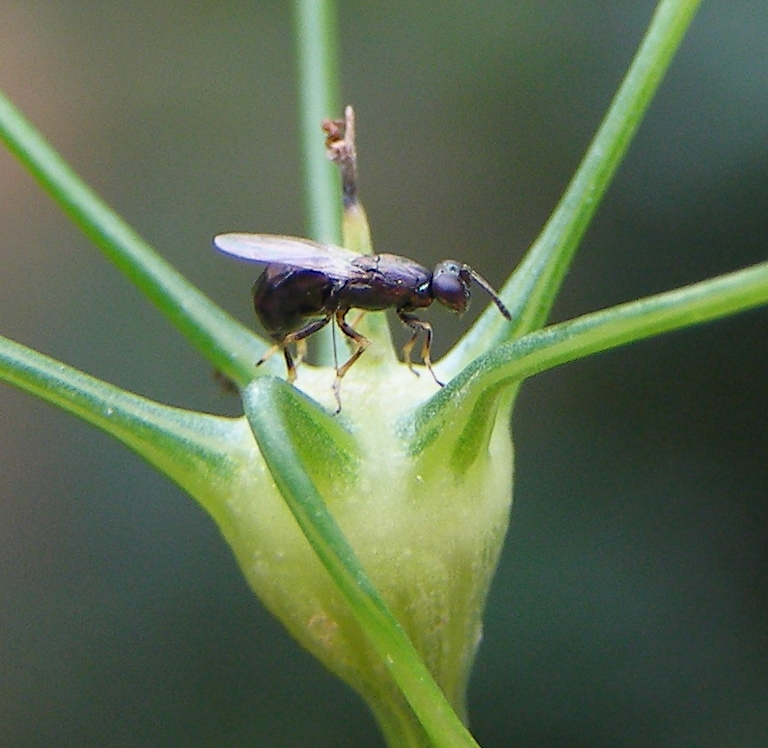
- Lasioptera carophila

Scientific classification
- Domain: Eukaryota
- Kingdom: Animalia
- Phylum: Arthropoda
- Class: Insecta
- Order: Diptera
- Family: Cecidomyiidae
- Subfamily: Cecidomyiinae
- Supertribe: Lasiopteridi
- Tribe: Lasiopterini
- Genus: Lasioptera; Meigen, 1818

Diversity
- at least 140 species

= Lasioptera =

Genus of flies

Lasioptera is a genus of gall midges in the family Cecidomyiidae. There are at least 140 described species in Lasioptera.

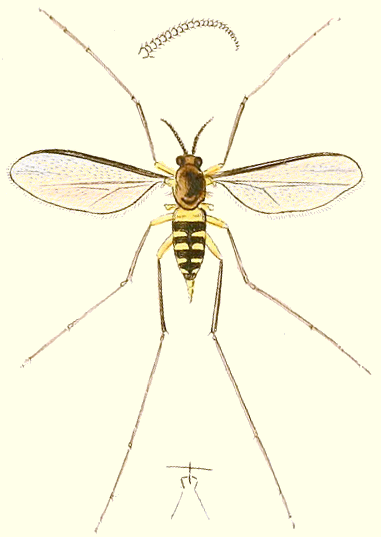
Lasioptera rubi

== See also ==
- List of Lasioptera species
