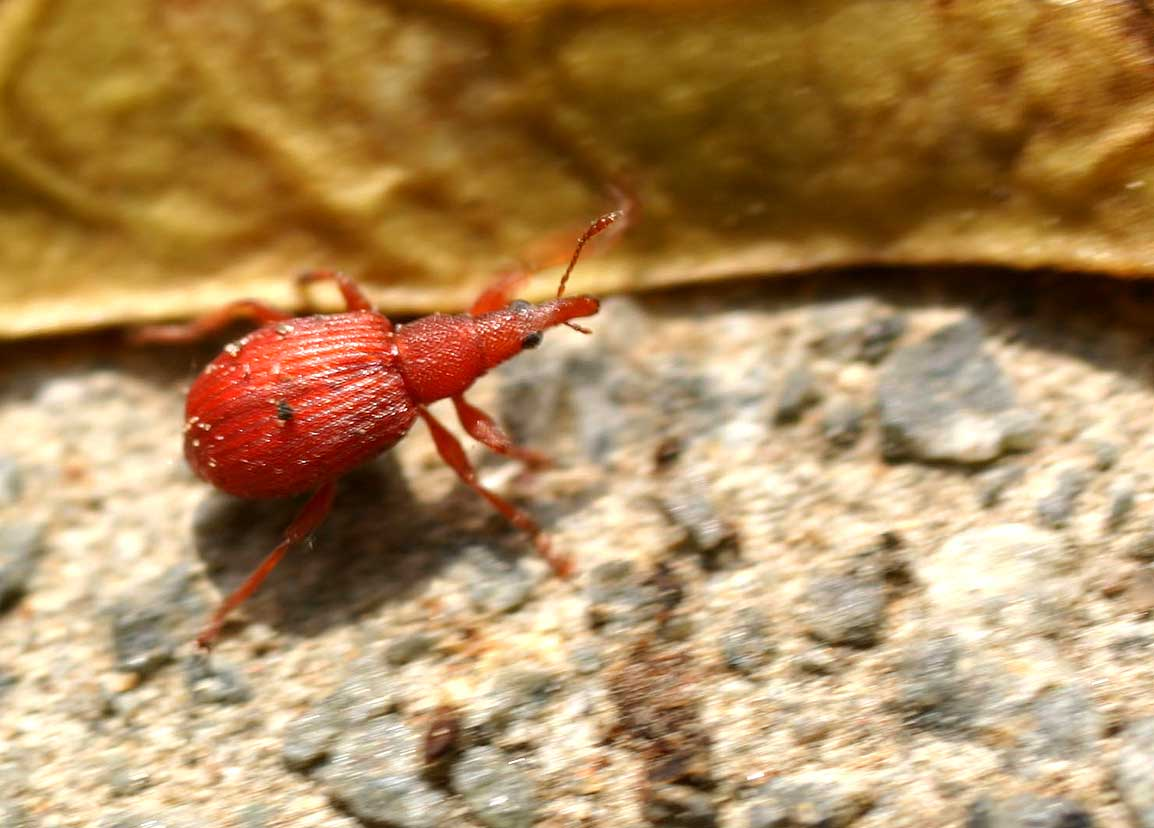
- Apion frumentarium

Scientific classification
- Kingdom: Animalia
- Phylum: Arthropoda
- Class: Insecta
- Order: Coleoptera
- Suborder: Polyphaga
- Infraorder: Cucujiformia
- Family: Brentidae
- Genus: Apion; Herbst, 1797

= Apion (beetle) =

Genus of beetles

Apion is a genus of beetles belonging to the family Brentidae. The genus was first described in 1797 by Johann Friedrich Wilhelm Herbst.

== Species ==
Species found in Australia include:

1. Apion orthodoxum Lea, 1926
2. Apion amabile Lea, 1899
3. Apion astri Lea, 1926
4. Apion basiinflatum Lea, 1926
5. Apion binotatum Lea, 1899
6. Apion carpophagum Lea, 1899
7. Apion comosum Pascoe, 1874
8. Apion condensatum Lea, 1899
9. Apion convexipenne Lea, 1910
10. Apion foveicolle Lea, 1899
11. Apion fuscosuturale Lea, 1899
12. Apion hoblerae Lea, 1915
13. Apion immundum Lea, 1899
14. Apion integricolle Lea, 1899
15. Apion melvillense Lea, 1926
16. Apion microscopicum Lea, 1910
17. Apion nigroterminale Lea, 1915
18. Apion pavocastaneum Lea, 1926
19. Apion philanthum Lea, 1899
20. Apion pictipes Lea, 1926
21. Apion pilistriatum Lea, 1910
22. Apion pudicum Lea, 1899
23. Apion pulicare Pascoe, 1874
24. Apion quadricolor Lea, 1926
25. Apion rivulare Lea, 1926
26. Apion solani Lea, 1899
27. Apion subopacum Lea, 1910
28. Apion tasmanicum Lea, 1910
29. Apion teretirostre Lea, 1899
30. Apion terraereginae Blackburn, 1892
31. Apion turbidum Lea, 1910

Additional species listed by GBIF include:

32. Apion alutaceicollis Richard, 1958
33. Apion antennatum (J.B.Smith, 1884)
34. Apion atratum Gravenhorst, 1807
35. Apion attenuatum Smith, 1884
36. Apion chloris Gravenhorst, 1807
37. Apion crotalariae (Fabricius, 1801)
38. Apion cruentatum Walton, 1844
39. Apion cuprescens Mannerheim, 1843
40. Apion dellabeffae Schatzmayr, 1922
41. Apion disparatum (Sharp, 1890)
42. Apion distincticolle Desbrochers, 1870
43. Apion exiguum Béguin-Billecocq, 1905
44. Apion extensum (J.B.Smith, 1884)
45. Apion femorale (Fabricius, 1801)
46. Apion frumentarium (Linnaeus, 1758)
47. Apion graecum Desbrochers, 1897
48. Apion guadelupense Hustache, 1929
49. Apion haematodes Kirby, 1808
50. Apion hustachei Ferragu, 1967
51. Apion iteratum Kissinger, 1974
52. Apion khnzoriani Zherikhin, 1971
53. Apion kissingeri Ferragu, 1967
54. Apion kuntzeni (Wagner, 1924)
55. Apion limbatum Thunberg, 1813
56. Apion longirostre Gravenhorst, 1807
57. Apion longithorax Desbrochers, 1889
58. Apion mauritii Béguin-Billecocq, 1905
59. Apion pamanzianum Béguin-Billecocq, 1904
60. Apion pauxillum Beguin-Billecocq, 1905
61. Apion pilosellumGravenhorst, 1807
62. Apion punctiger (Paykull, 1792)
63. Apion rubens Stephens, 1839
64. Apion rubiginosum Grill, 1893
65. Apion strigipenne Schilsky, 1902
66. Apion subdiscedens (Voss, 1953)
