= Maskell =

Maskell or Maskel may refer to:

== People ==
- Richard Maskel (born 1954), American curler
- Arthur Maskell (1894–1970), Australian rules footballer
- Bob Maskell (1940–2021), Canadian teacher and politician
- Craig Maskell (born 1968), English football player
- Dan Maskell (1908-1992), English tennis player
- Duncan Maskell (born 1961), British biochemist and academic
- Edna Maskell (born 1928), Northern Rhodesian athlete
- Harold Maskell (1911–1972), Australian rules footballer
- Joseph Maskell (1939–2001), American Catholic priest
- Les Maskell (1917-1988), Australian rules footballer
- Michael Maskell (sport shooter) (born 1966), Barbadian olympian
- Michael Maskell (footballer) (born 1952), English football player
- Neil Maskell (born 1976), English actor
- Rachael Maskell (born 1972), British MP
- Rosalind Maskell (1928–2016), English microbiologist
- Virginia Maskell (1936–1968), English actress
- William Maskell (1814–1890), English Church of England priest and Catholic convert
- William Miles Maskell (1839–1898), New Zealand farmer

== Places ==
- Maskell, Nebraska, United States

== See also ==
- Robert Maskell Patterson (1787-1854), American professor and 6th director of the U.S. Mint
