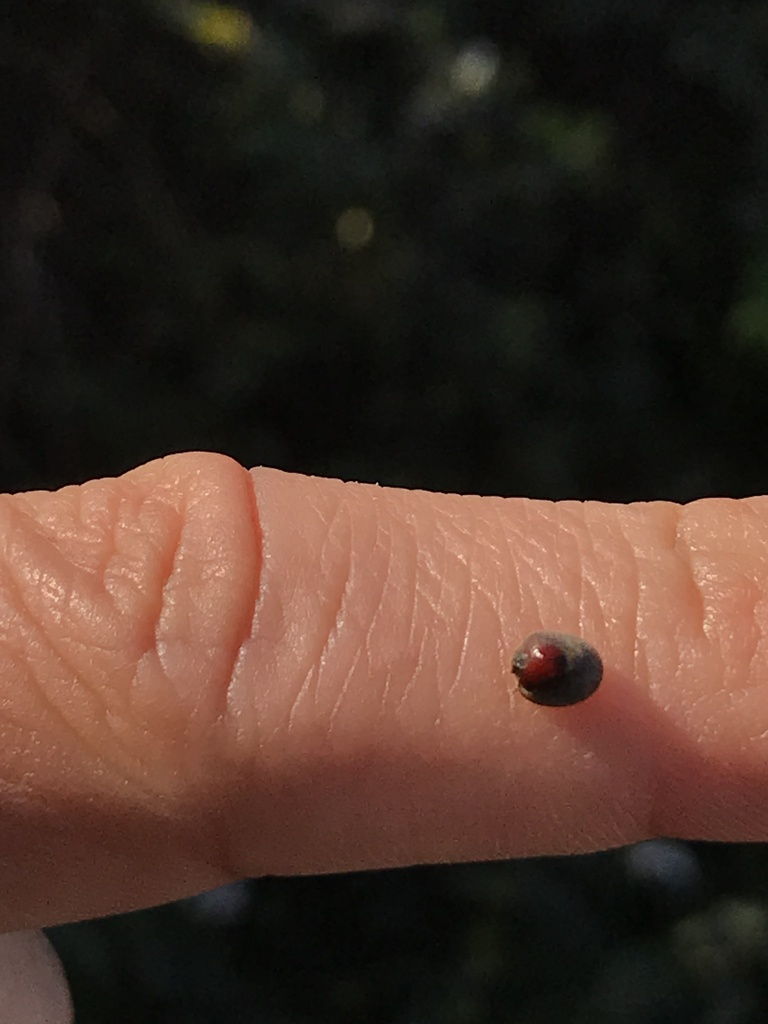

Scientific classification
- Kingdom: Animalia
- Phylum: Arthropoda
- Clade: Pancrustacea
- Class: Insecta
- Order: Coleoptera
- Suborder: Polyphaga
- Infraorder: Cucujiformia
- Family: Coccinellidae
- Genus: Novius
- Species: N. fumidus

Binomial name
- Novius fumidus (Mulsant, 1850)

Synonyms
- Rodolia fumida Mulsant, 1850; Rodolia roseipennis Mulsant, 1850; Epilachna arethusa Mulsant, 1853; Epilachna testicolor Mulsant, 1853; Rodolia chermesina var. dionysia Sicard, 1909

= Novius fumidus =

Species of beetle

Novius fumidus is a species of beetle of the family Coccinellidae. It is found in India (Andhra Pradesh, Arunachal Pradesh, Bihar, Gujarat, Himachal Pradesh, Karnataka, Kerala, Madhya Pradesh, Punjab, Rajasthan, Sikkim, Tamil Nadu, Uttar Pradesh, Uttarakhand, West Bengal), Pakistan, Sri Lanka, Nepal, Myanmar, Mauritius, the Seychelles, Rodrigues, China (Fujian, Guangdong, Yunnan), Vietnam and Africa.

== Description ==
Adults reach a length of about 4.08–5.6 mm (0.161–0.220 in). They are entirely or partly reddish testaceous or reddish or dull reddish brown or darker brown, the elytra sometimes bright reddish or reddish brown with vague darker patches or with the sublateral margins darker brown or fuscous.

== Life history ==
They have been recorded preying on Drosicha mangiferae, Drosicha stebbingii, Icerya purchasi, Icerya pilosa, Perissopneumon ferox, Perissopneumon tamarindus and Aleurodicus dispersus.
