= Chnoodes =

- Chnoodes pseudosanguinea

Scientific classification
- Kingdom: Animalia
- Phylum: Arthropoda
- Clade: Pancrustacea
- Class: Insecta
- Order: Coleoptera
- Suborder: Polyphaga
- Infraorder: Cucujiformia
- Family: Coccinellidae
- Tribe: Coccidulini
- Genus: Chnoodes; Chevrolat in d'Orbigny, 1843

Synonyms
- Chnoodes Chevrolat in Dejean, 1836 (nomen nudum); Chnoodes Chevrolat in Dejean, 1837 (nomen nudum); Chapinella Gordon, 1995 (unnecessary name); Chapinula Ukrainsky, 2007 (unnecessary replacement name)

Genus of insects

Chnoodes is a genus of beetles in the family Coccinellidae.

== Species ==
- Chnoodes abendrothi
- Chnoodes arrowi
- Chnoodes atra
- Chnoodes bipartitus
- Chnoodes boliviana
- Chnoodes brasiliensis
- Chnoodes brulei
- Chnoodes centralis
- Chnoodes cerasus
- Chnoodes chaudoiri
- Chnoodes cinctipennis
- Chnoodes clarkii
- Chnoodes decemmaculata
- Chnoodes decipiens
- Chnoodes discomaculata
- Chnoodes dorsalis
- Chnoodes felis
- Chnoodes gounellei
- Chnoodes gravata
- Chnoodes humeralis
- Chnoodes kumagaiae
- Chnoodes machadoi
- Chnoodes maculamantis
- Chnoodes melanus
- Chnoodes migueli
- Chnoodes nigra
- Chnoodes nigripes
- Chnoodes pentagona
- Chnoodes pseudosanguinea
- Chnoodes quadrimaculata
- Chnoodes rubra
- Chnoodes rufovittata
- Chnoodes separata
- Chnoodes sexmaculata
- Chnoodes splendidus
- Chnoodes tarsalis
- Chnoodes terminalis
- Chnoodes tristis
- Chnoodes trivia
- Chnoodes unimaculata
- Chnoodes yanayacu

== Selected former species ==
- Chnoodes bipunctata
- Chnoodes bistripustulata
