= Novius octoguttatus =

Scientific classification
- Kingdom: Animalia
- Phylum: Arthropoda
- Clade: Pancrustacea
- Class: Insecta
- Order: Coleoptera
- Suborder: Polyphaga
- Infraorder: Cucujiformia
- Family: Coccinellidae
- Genus: Novius
- Species: N. octoguttatus

Binomial name
- Novius octoguttatus (Weise, 1910)

Synonyms
- Rodolia octoguttata Weise, 1910

Species of beetle

Novius octoguttatus is a species of beetle of the family Coccinellidae. It is found in India (Meghalaya, Uttarakhand, Rajasthan), Sri Lanka, Nepal, Myanmar, Thailand and China.

== Description ==
Adults reach a length of about 3.5–5 mm (0.14–0.20 in). They are dark reddish brown or rusty reddish brown, the pronotum with two black spots. Each elytron has four black spots. The ventral surface is rusty red to yellowish brown.

== Life history ==
They have been recorded preying on Icerya species and Drosicha mangiferae.
