= Novius amabilis =

Scientific classification
- Kingdom: Animalia
- Phylum: Arthropoda
- Clade: Pancrustacea
- Class: Insecta
- Order: Coleoptera
- Suborder: Polyphaga
- Infraorder: Cucujiformia
- Family: Coccinellidae
- Genus: Novius
- Species: N. amabilis

Binomial name
- Novius amabilis (Kapur, 1949)

Synonyms
- Rodolia amabilis Kapur, 1949

Species of beetle

Novius amabilis is a species of lady beetle native to India (Andhra Pradesh, Karnataka, Kerala, Maharashtra, Tamil Nadu, Uttar Pradesh) and Sri Lanka.

== Description ==
The body length of Novius amabilis is about 3.25 mm.

== Biology ==
The species is a predator of Icerya purchasi, and Saccharicoccus sacchari.
