= Novius minimus =

Scientific classification
- Kingdom: Animalia
- Phylum: Arthropoda
- Clade: Pancrustacea
- Class: Insecta
- Order: Coleoptera
- Suborder: Polyphaga
- Infraorder: Cucujiformia
- Family: Coccinellidae
- Genus: Novius
- Species: N. minimus

Binomial name
- Novius minimus (Kapur, 1949)

Synonyms
- Rodolia minima Kapur, 1949

Species of beetle

Novius minimus is a species of beetle of the family Coccinellidae. It is found in India (Karnataka, Tamil Nadu).

== Description ==
Adults reach a length of about 2.35 mm (0.093 in). The dorsal and ventral surface are reddish testaceous to carmine red, with the apical one-third and lateral borders of the elytra darker.

== Life history ==
They have been recorded preying on Icerya purchasi.
