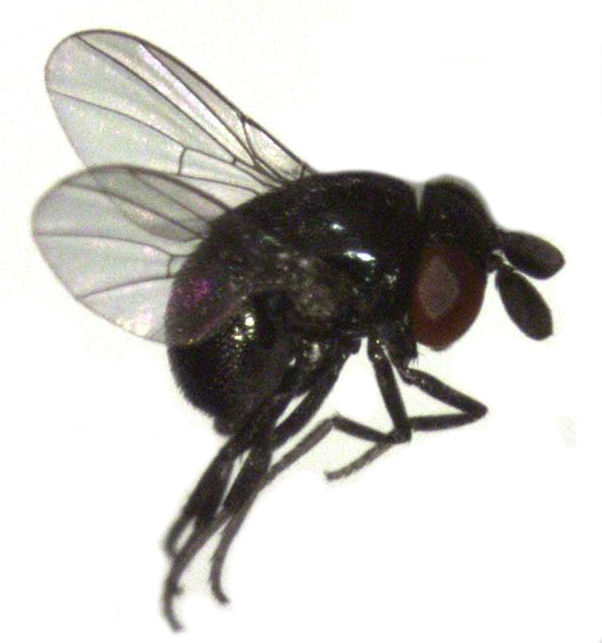

Scientific classification
- Kingdom: Animalia
- Phylum: Arthropoda
- Class: Insecta
- Order: Diptera
- Family: Cryptochetidae
- Genus: Cryptochetum
- Species: C. iceryae

Binomial name
- Cryptochetum iceryae (Williston, 1888)

Synonyms
- Lestophonus iceryae Williston, 1888

= Cryptochetum iceryae =

Species of fly

Cryptochetum iceryae, the cottony cushion scale parasite, is a species of scale parasite fly in the family Cryptochetidae. Originating in Australia, it was deliberately introduced to California in the 1880s in an attempt to control cottony cushion scale, and has also been introduced to Israel and South America. In 2019, the species was discovered in the United Kingdom for the first time, having been identified in the wildlife garden at the Natural History Museum.
