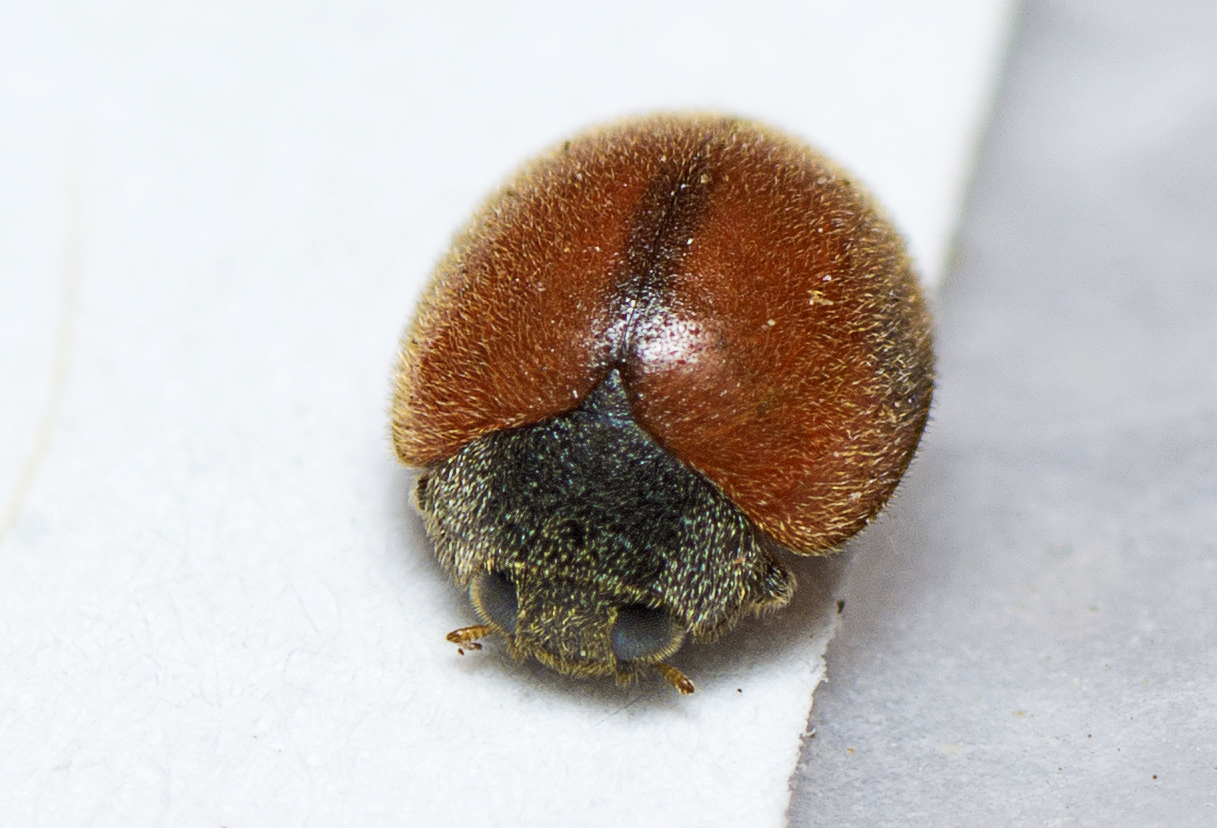

Scientific classification
- Kingdom: Animalia
- Phylum: Arthropoda
- Clade: Pancrustacea
- Class: Insecta
- Order: Coleoptera
- Suborder: Polyphaga
- Infraorder: Cucujiformia
- Family: Coccinellidae
- Subfamily: Coccinellinae
- Tribe: Noviini
- Genus: Novius
- Species: N. koebelei

Binomial name
- Novius koebelei Olliff, 1892

Synonyms
- Novius ruber Blackburn, 1889; Novius discoidalis Blackburn, 1895; Novius limbatus Blackburn, 1895 (Preocc.); Novius simplicipennis Blackburn, 1895; Novius tripustulatus Blackburn, 1895; Novius tridens Lea, 1902; Novius blackburni Ukrainsky, 2009; Rodolia koebelei (Olliff, 1892); Rodolia rubra (Blackburn, 1889); Rodolia discoidalis (Blackburn, 1895)

= Novius koebelei =

Species of beetle

Novius koebelei is a species of ladybird beetle native to Australia. It is also present in the wild in New Zealand, where it is of exotic origin. In New Zealand, it was first reported in 2006, having been found in Auckland. It has been known under many names; due to variation in its colouration, it has been described as new six times after its original description in 1892.

This species was introduced into California for biocontrol, alongside N. cardinalis. It is not thought to persist there now, however.

== Description ==
Compared to the better-known Novius cardinalis, koebelei typically has much more strongly confluent markings. This often creates a large concurrent red patch on each elytron, though some individuals may be entirely uniform red, and other variants exist.
