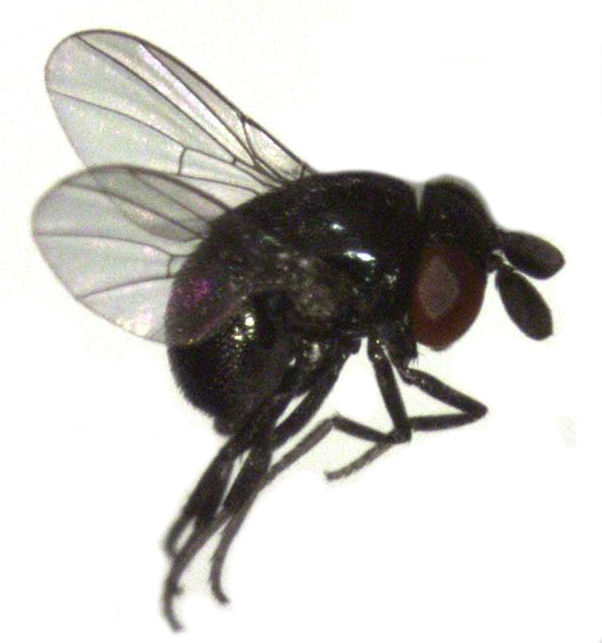
- Cryptochetum iceryae

Scientific classification
- Kingdom: Animalia
- Phylum: Arthropoda
- Class: Insecta
- Order: Diptera
- Superfamily: Lonchaeoidea
- Family: Cryptochetidae
- Genus: Cryptochetum; Rondani, 1875

Type species
- Cryptochetum grandicorne Rondani, 1875

Synonyms
- Atriangulum Bruggen, 1960; Cryptochaetum Williston, 1888; Cryptochoetum Rondani, 1875; Lestophonus Williston, 1888; Tritolestes Ghesquiere, 1943

= Cryptochetum =

Genus of flies

Cryptochetum is a genus of scale parasite flies in the family Cryptochetidae. There are more than 30 described species in Cryptochetum.

== Species ==
These 35 species belong to the genus Cryptochetum:

- C. acuticornutum (Yang & Yang, 1998)
- C. aenescens (Meijere, 1916)
- C. aspidoprocti Ghesquiere, 1943
- C. brachycerum Thorpe, 1941
- C. brevicostatum Bruggen, 1960
- C. buccatum Hendel, 1933
- C. capense Bruggen, 1960
- C. chalybeum (Meijere, 1916)
- C. curtipenne Knab, 1914
- C. euthyiproboscise Xi & Yin, 2020
- C. fastidiosum Bezzi, 1920
- C. ghanii Steyskal, 1971
- C. glochidiatusum Xi & Yin, 2020
- C. grandicorne Rondani, 1875
- C. iceryae (Williston, 1888) (cottony cushion scale parasite)
- C. idiocerum Thorpe, 1941
- C. jorgepastori (Cadahia, 1984)
- C. latimanum Malloch, 1927
- C. longilingum Xi & Yin, 2020
- C. medianum (Yang & Yang, 1998)
- C. melan Ghesquiere, 1943
- C. mineuri Séguy, 1953
- C. mixtum Bruggen, 1960
- C. monophlebi (Skuse, 1889)
- C. nipponense (Tokunaga, 1943)
- C. nonagintaseptem Yang & Yang, 1998
- C. oocerum Thorpe, 1941
- C. pariceryae Thorpe, 1941
- C. shaanxiense Xi & Yang, 2015
- C. smaragdinum Séguy, 1948
- C. striatum Thorpe, 1941
- C. tianmuense Yang & Yang, 2001
- C. tuberculatum Thorpe, 1941
- C. turanicum Nartshuk, 1979
- C. utile Bruggen, 1960
- C. vayssierei Ghesquière, 1950
- C. yunnanum Xi & Yang, 2015
- C. zalatilabium Xi & Yang, 2015
