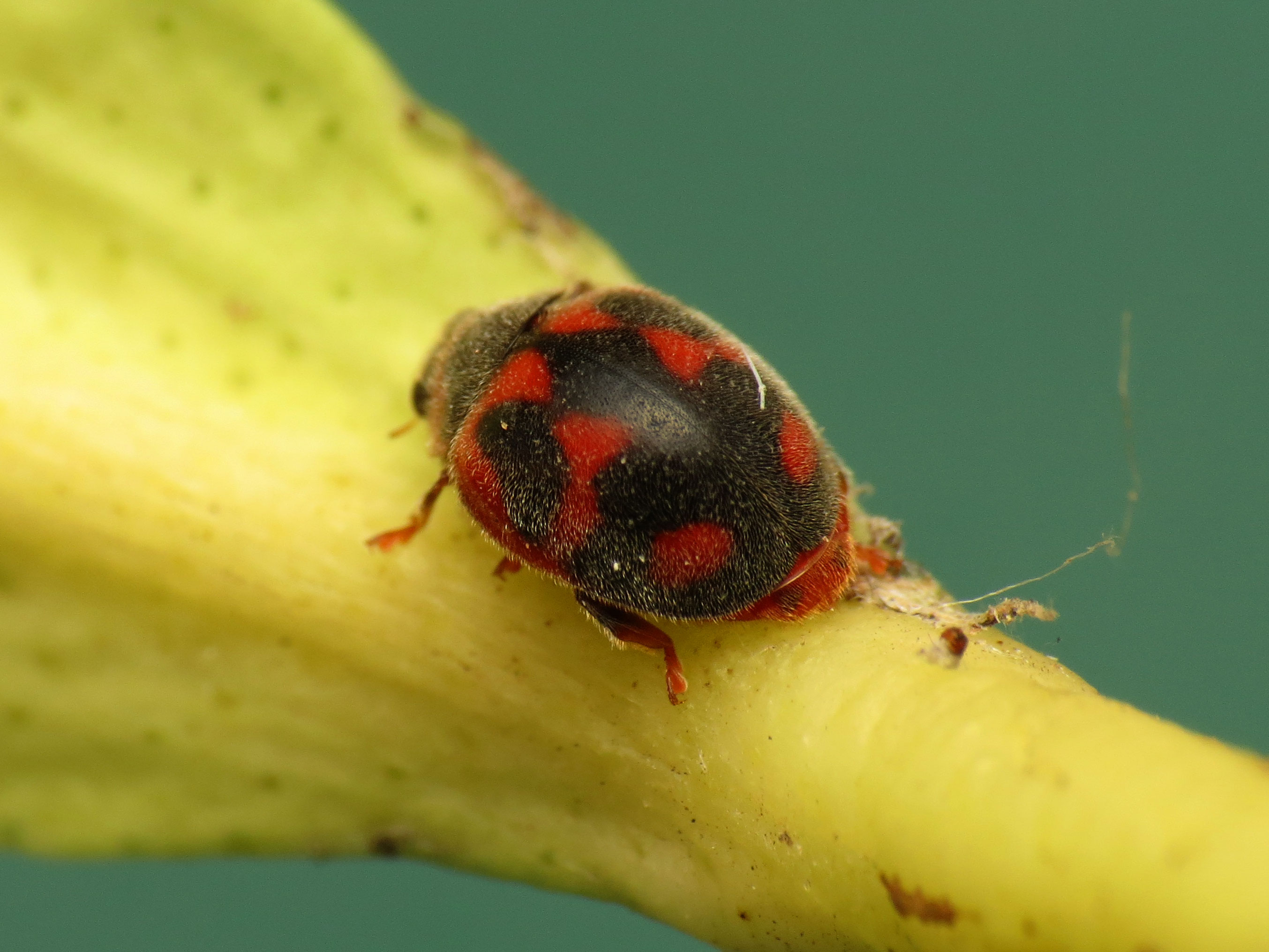
- Novius cardinalis

Scientific classification
- Kingdom: Animalia
- Phylum: Arthropoda
- Clade: Pancrustacea
- Class: Insecta
- Order: Coleoptera
- Suborder: Polyphaga
- Infraorder: Cucujiformia
- Family: Coccinellidae
- Subfamily: Coccinellinae
- Tribe: Noviini; Mulsant, 1850
- Genus: Novius; Mulsant, 1846

Synonyms
- Nomius Mulsant, 1846 (Preocc.); Rodolia Mulsant, 1850; Rodolia (Macronovius) Weise, 1885; Eurodolia Weise, 1895; Anovia Casey, 1908; Rhodolia Poole, 1996 (Missp.)

= Novius (beetle) =

Genus of beetles

Novius is a genus of ladybird beetles belonging to the family Coccinellidae, and the sole member of the tribe Noviini. The genus as presently defined contains over 70 species, most of which were formerly placed in the genera Rodolia and Anovia, but after decades of debate, both of these genera are now considered to be junior synonyms of Novius.

== Description ==
Novius species have a semispherical body, covered with dense, short hairs. They are reddish-purple, with or without black spots.

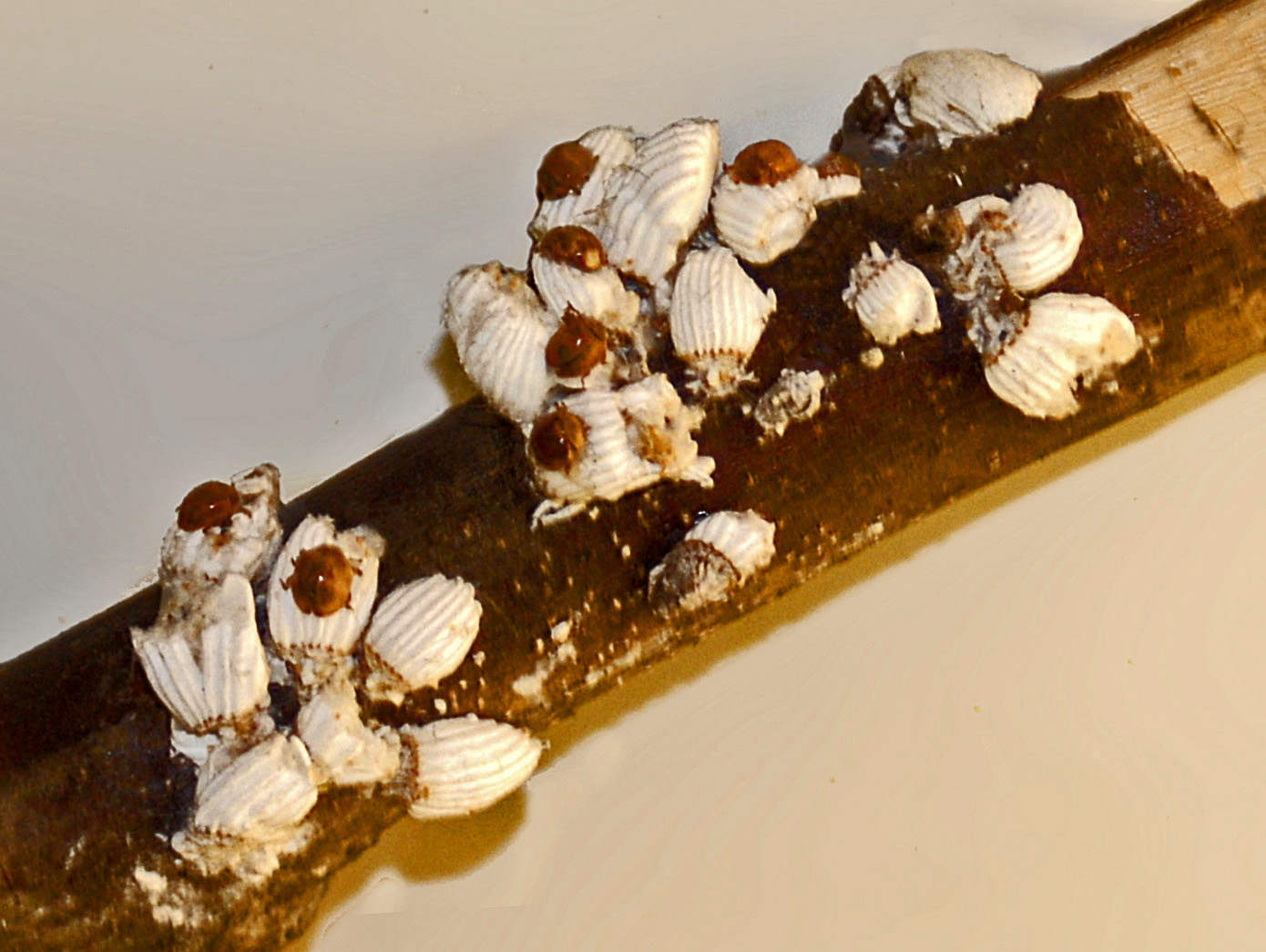
Adults of Novius species feeding on females of cottony cushion scales (Icerya species)

Novius species regularly feed on scale insects, aphids and small mites, which makes them candidates as biological control agents. One such species used in biocontrol is Novius cardinalis, introduced worldwide in tropical and subtropical regions, and now effectively cosmopolitan. Other species have been introduced in more restricted areas (e.g., Micronesia), though always for the biological control of pest insects.

== Species ==
- Novius alluaudi (Sicard, 1909)
- Novius amabilis (Kapur, 1949)
- Novius andamanicus (Weise, 1901)
- Novius apicalis (Sicard, 1909)
- Novius argodi (Sicard, 1909)
- Novius bellus Blackburn, 1889
- Novius bipunctatus (Gorham, 1895)
- Novius breviusculus (Weise, 1892)
- Novius canariensis Korschefsky, 1931
- Novius capucinus (Fürsch, 1975)
- Novius cardinalis (Mulsant, 1850) – Vedalia beetle
- Novius chapaensis (Hoang, 1980)
- Novius cinctipennis (Weise, 1912)
- Novius circumclusus (Gorham, 1899)
- Novius concolor (Lewis, 1879)
- Novius conicollis Korschefsky, 1931
- Novius contrarius (Sicard, 1931)
- Novius cruentatus Mulsant, 1846
- Novius delobeli (Chazeau, 1981)
- Novius fausti (Weise, 1885)
- Novius ferrugineus (Weise, 1900)
- Novius formosanus (Korschefsky, 1935)
- Novius fulvescens (Hoang, 1980)
- Novius fumidus (Mulsant, 1850)
- Novius hauseri (Mader, 1939)
- Novius iceryae (Janson, 1889)
- Novius insularis (Weise, 1895)
- Novius koebelei Olliff, 1892
- Novius limbatus Motschulsky, 1866
- Novius lindi Blackburn, 1889
- Novius lydiae (Chazeau, 1991)
- Novius marek Ślipiński & Pang, 2020
- Novius marginatus (Bielawski, 1960)
- Novius mayottensis (Fürsch, 2003)
- Novius mexicanus (Gordon, 1972)
- Novius minimus (Kapur, 1949)
- Novius minutus (Sicard, 1909)
- Novius netara (Kapur, 1949)
- Novius niger (Fürsch, 1995)
- Novius nigerrimus Fürsch, 1960
- Novius nigrofrontalis (Kapur, 1951)
- Novius obscuricollis (Sicard, 1931)
- Novius occidentalis (Weise, 1898)
- Novius octoguttatus (Weise, 1910)
- Novius parvulus (Kirsch & Mitteil, 1875)
- Novius peruvianus (Gordon, 1972)
- Novius picicollis (Weise, 1900)
- Novius podagricus (Weise, 1908)
- Novius pronuba (Chazeau, 1991)
- Novius prosternalis (Sicard, 1909)
- Novius pumilus (Weise, 1892)
- Novius punctigera (Weise, 1901)
- Novius punicus (Gordon, 1972)
- Novius quadrimaculatus (Mader, 1939)
- Novius quadriplagiatus (Sicard, 1909)
- Novius quadrispilotus (Sicard, 1909)
- Novius rubeus (Mulsant, 1850)
- Novius ruficollis (Mulsant, 1850)
- Novius rufipennis (Pic, 1926)
- Novius rufocincta (Lewis, 1896)
- Novius rufopilosus (Mulsant, 1850)
- Novius sanguinolentus Mulsant, 1850
- Novius seabrai (Sicard, 1921)
- Novius senegalensis (Weise, 1913)
- Novius sexmaculatus (Korschefsky, 1940)
- Novius sexnotatus (Mulsant, 1850)
- Novius shuiro (Kitano, 2014)
- Novius songchuanus (Hoang, 1980)
- Novius tamdaoanus (Hoang, 1980)
- Novius usambaricus (Weise, 1898)
- Novius virginalis (Wickham, 1905)
- Novius vulpinus (Fürsch, 1974)
- Novius weisei (Gordon, 1972)
- Novius westermanni (Crotch, 1874)
- Novius xianfengensis (Xiao, 1992)
- Novius yemenensis Raimundo & Fürsch, 2006

== Selected former species ==
- Novius manganensis (Singh, 2014), described as Rodolia manganensis from India (Sikkim). (nomen dubium)
