= Novius breviusculus =

Scientific classification
- Kingdom: Animalia
- Phylum: Arthropoda
- Clade: Pancrustacea
- Class: Insecta
- Order: Coleoptera
- Suborder: Polyphaga
- Infraorder: Cucujiformia
- Family: Coccinellidae
- Genus: Novius
- Species: N. breviusculus

Binomial name
- Novius breviusculus (Weise, 1892)

Synonyms
- Rodolia breviuscula Weise, 1892

Species of beetle

Novius breviusculus is a species of beetle of the family Coccinellidae. It is found in India (Karnataka, Kerala, Tamil Nadu), Sri Lanka, Myanmar, Thailand and China. It was introduced on Guam and the Marshall Islands.

== Description ==
Adults reach a length of about 3.25–4 mm (0.128–0.157 in). They are reddish or orange-testaceous on both the upper surface and ventral surface.

== Life history ==
They have been recorded preying on Aleurodicus dispersus, Icerya aegyptiaca, Icerya purchasi and Monophlebus species.
