= Novius andamanicus =

Scientific classification
- Kingdom: Animalia
- Phylum: Arthropoda
- Clade: Pancrustacea
- Class: Insecta
- Order: Coleoptera
- Suborder: Polyphaga
- Infraorder: Cucujiformia
- Family: Coccinellidae
- Genus: Novius
- Species: N. andamanicus

Binomial name
- Novius andamanicus (Weise, 1901)

Synonyms
- Rodolia andamanica Weise, 1901

Species of beetle

Novius andamanicus is a species of beetle of the family Coccinellidae. It is found in India (Andaman Islands) and the Philippines.

== Description ==
Adults reach a length of about 4.8–5.2 mm (0.19–0.20 in). The dorsal surface is reddish brown to testaceous.

== Life history ==
They have been recorded preying on Icerya purchasi.
