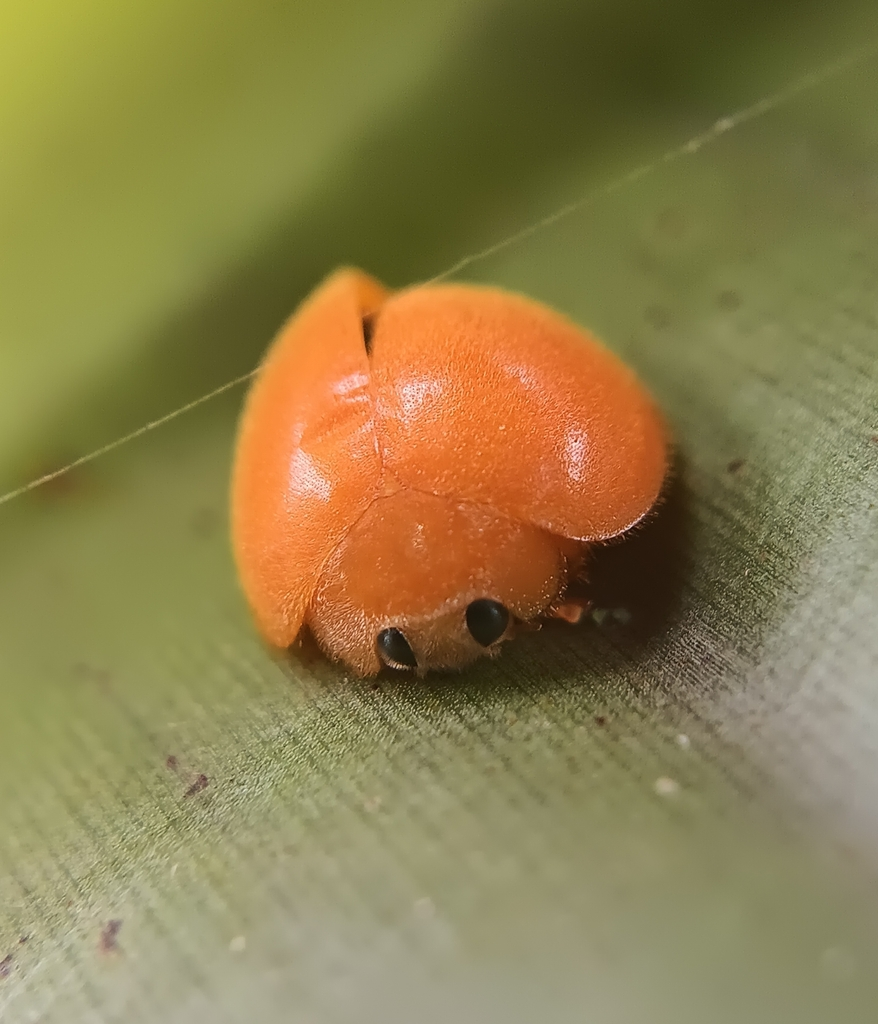

Scientific classification
- Kingdom: Animalia
- Phylum: Arthropoda
- Clade: Pancrustacea
- Class: Insecta
- Order: Coleoptera
- Suborder: Polyphaga
- Infraorder: Cucujiformia
- Family: Coccinellidae
- Genus: Novius
- Species: N. pumilus

Binomial name
- Novius pumilus (Weise, 1892)

Synonyms
- Rodolia pumila Weise, 1892; Rodolia okinawensis Miyatake, 1959

= Novius pumilus =

Species of beetle

Novius pumilus is a beetle in the genus Novius found in Taiwan, India (Punjab, Uttarakhand), Vietnam, China, Japan and Micronesia (including Guam).

== Description ==
Adults reach a length of about 2.4–2.6 mm (0.094–0.102 in). The species is hairy and has a lady beetle shape with a two-winged shell. The coloration is dark orange. The eyes are large and beady.

== Introductions ==
The species has spread into the western US like many other Novius species.

== Life history ==
They have been recorded preying on Icerya species.
