= Novius punicus =

Scientific classification
- Kingdom: Animalia
- Phylum: Arthropoda
- Clade: Pancrustacea
- Class: Insecta
- Order: Coleoptera
- Suborder: Polyphaga
- Infraorder: Cucujiformia
- Family: Coccinellidae
- Genus: Novius
- Species: N. punicus

Binomial name
- Novius punicus (Gordon, 1972)

Synonyms
- Anovia punica Gordon, 1972

Species of beetle

Novius punicus is a species of beetle of the family Coccinellidae. It is found in Honduras, Panama, Colombia, Venezuela and Trinidad.

== Description ==
Adults reach a length of about 3-3.42 mm. Adults are reddish purple. The anterior margin and angles of the pronotum and the lateral margin of the elytron are red.

== Biology ==
It has been recorded feeding on Icerya purchasi and Icerya montserratensis.
