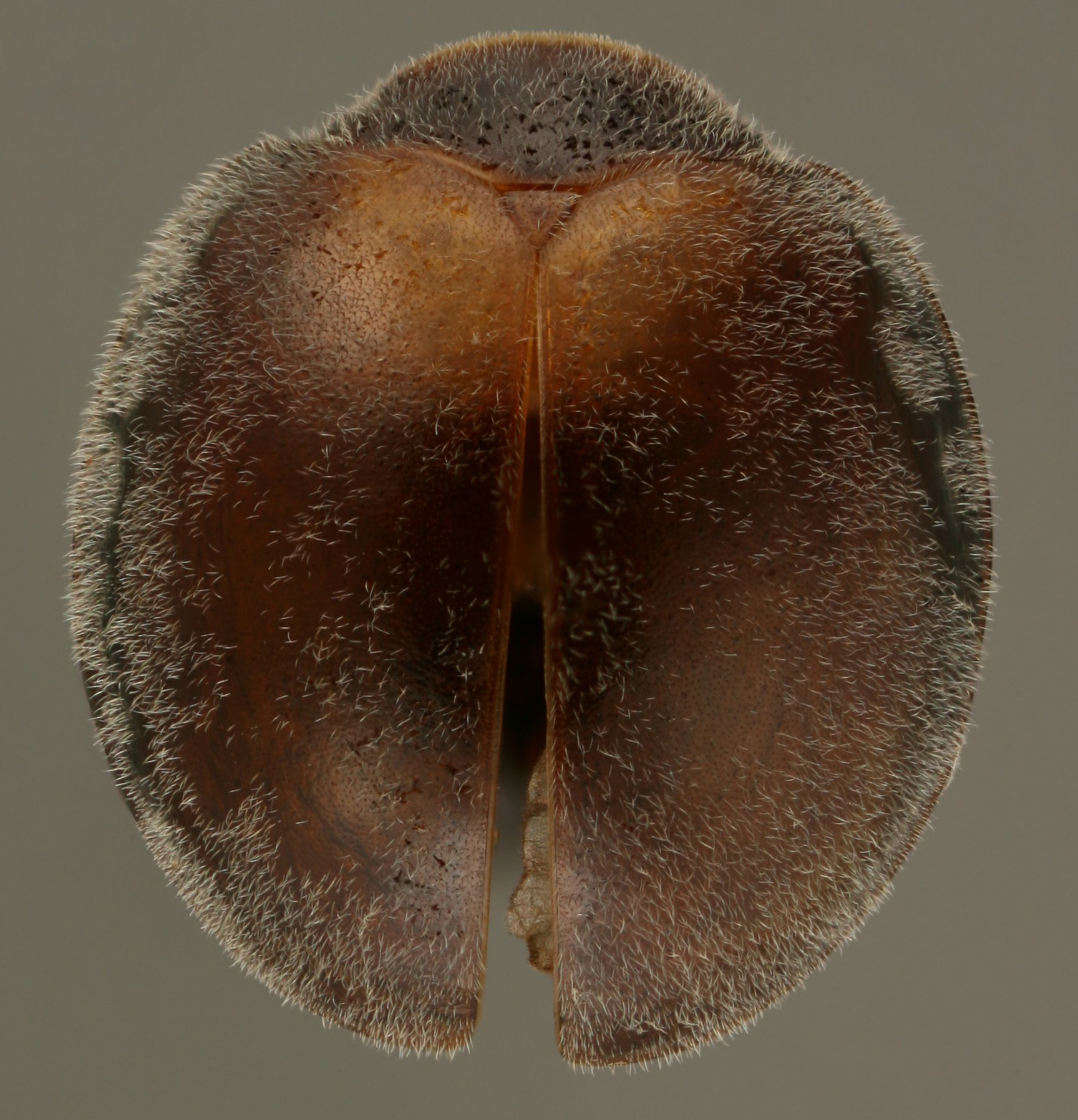

Scientific classification
- Kingdom: Animalia
- Phylum: Arthropoda
- Clade: Pancrustacea
- Class: Insecta
- Order: Coleoptera
- Suborder: Polyphaga
- Infraorder: Cucujiformia
- Family: Coccinellidae
- Subfamily: Coccinellinae
- Tribe: Noviini
- Genus: Novius
- Species: N. iceryae

Binomial name
- Novius iceryae (Janson in Ormerod, 1889)

Synonyms
- Rodolia iceryae Janson, 1889; Rodolia obscura Weise, 1898

= Novius iceryae =

Species of beetle

Novius iceryae is a species of ladybird beetle native to Afrotropical realm, and was described from South Africa. It is also found in Senegal. In 1880, Novius iceryae was used to successfully control cottony cushion scale, Icerya purchasi in South Africa. It was later introduced in New Zealand for the management of cottony cushion scale. This and related species were formerly classified in the genus Rodolia.

== Description ==
Novius iceryae is about 3-5 mm long with a shiny and hemispherical body and pubescent dorsal surface. The base of the elytra has a large semicircular blood-red spot, enclosing the scutellum. The head is concealed from above. It is also found in Senegal. Novius iceryae is similar to other species of the genus Novius, (e.g., Novius insularis, Novius occidentalis), but they can be separated separate one from another by the structure of their male genitalia.
