= Platynaspis flavoguttata =

Scientific classification
- Kingdom: Animalia
- Phylum: Arthropoda
- Clade: Pancrustacea
- Class: Insecta
- Order: Coleoptera
- Suborder: Polyphaga
- Infraorder: Cucujiformia
- Family: Coccinellidae
- Genus: Platynaspis
- Species: P. flavoguttata

Binomial name
- Platynaspis flavoguttata (Gorham, 1894)

Synonyms
- Scymnus? flavoguttatus Gorham 1894; Pharus flavoguttata Weise 1895; Platynaspis flavoguttata Sicard 1913

Species of beetle

Platynaspis flavoguttata is a species of lady beetle native to India, Sri Lanka and Myanmar.

== Distribution ==
In India, the species is observed from Sagara: Mullluman, Karnataka province. In Sri Lanka, it is found in Habaraduwa area, Galle district.

== Description ==
It is a broad oval insect with a densely haired body and a mixture of yellow and dark brown hairs. The head is yellowish with a longitudinal median reddish brown band. Sometimes there can be a reddish brown band with a pair of yellowish lateral spots. The pronotum is dark reddish brown with three yellowish markings. Each elytron consists with three spots in a 2–1 arrangement. The antennae, mouth, and legs are lighter yellowish brown.

The Sri Lanka form is slightly different from its Indian counterparts, its head is fully brown. There are subtriangular, yellowish lateral markings on the pronotum. The elytron with the discal spot distinctly more rounded, and the apical spot is crescent-shaped.

== Biology ==
Larva are observed in the holes in Terminalia paniculata. Show mutualistic relationship with red ants.
