= Phanerochaetum =

Scientific classification
- Kingdom: Animalia
- Phylum: Arthropoda
- Clade: Pancrustacea
- Class: Insecta
- Order: Diptera
- Family: Cryptochetidae
- Genus: Phanerochaetum; Hennig, 1965
- Species: P. tuxeni

Binomial name
- Phanerochaetum tuxeni Hennig, 1965

Genus of flies

Phanerochaetum is a genus of flies in the family Cryptochetidae. There is one described species Phanerochaetum tuxeni.
