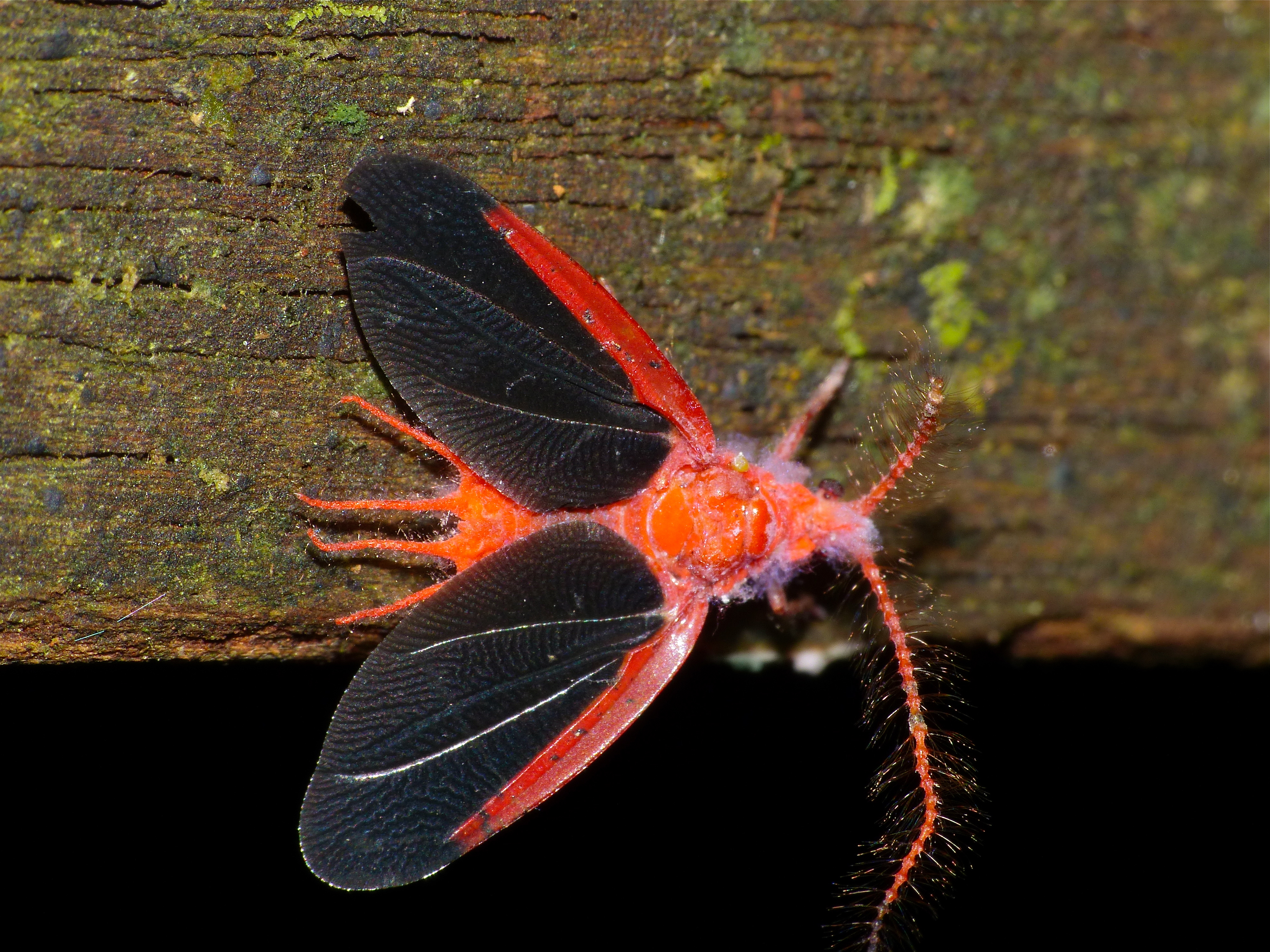
- Adult male

Scientific classification
- Kingdom: Animalia
- Phylum: Arthropoda
- Clade: Pancrustacea
- Class: Insecta
- Order: Hemiptera
- Suborder: Sternorrhyncha
- Family: Monophlebidae
- Genus: Drosicha
- Species: D. corpulenta

Binomial name
- Drosicha corpulenta (Kuwana, 1902)

Synonyms
- Drosicha corplenta Shi, 1991; Warajicoccus corpulenta Kuwana, 1922; Monophlebus corpulenta Kuwana, 1902; Drosicha corpulenta Cockerell, 1902

= Drosicha corpulenta =

Species of true bug

Drosicha corpulenta is a species of giant scale insect in the family Monophlebidae, in the superfamily Coccoidea. It is native to eastern Asia where it feeds on a range of trees, shrubs and non-woody plants.

== Description ==
The adult female grows to a length of about 16 mm (0.6 in) and a width of about 7 mm (0.3 in). The antennae and legs are black while the body colour is brown. The insect is covered with a white, cottony waxy substance which is densest on the underside. The male is very different in appearance; he is much smaller, has a pair of long feathery antennae, two compound eyes, no mouth and a pair of functional wings.

== Distribution ==
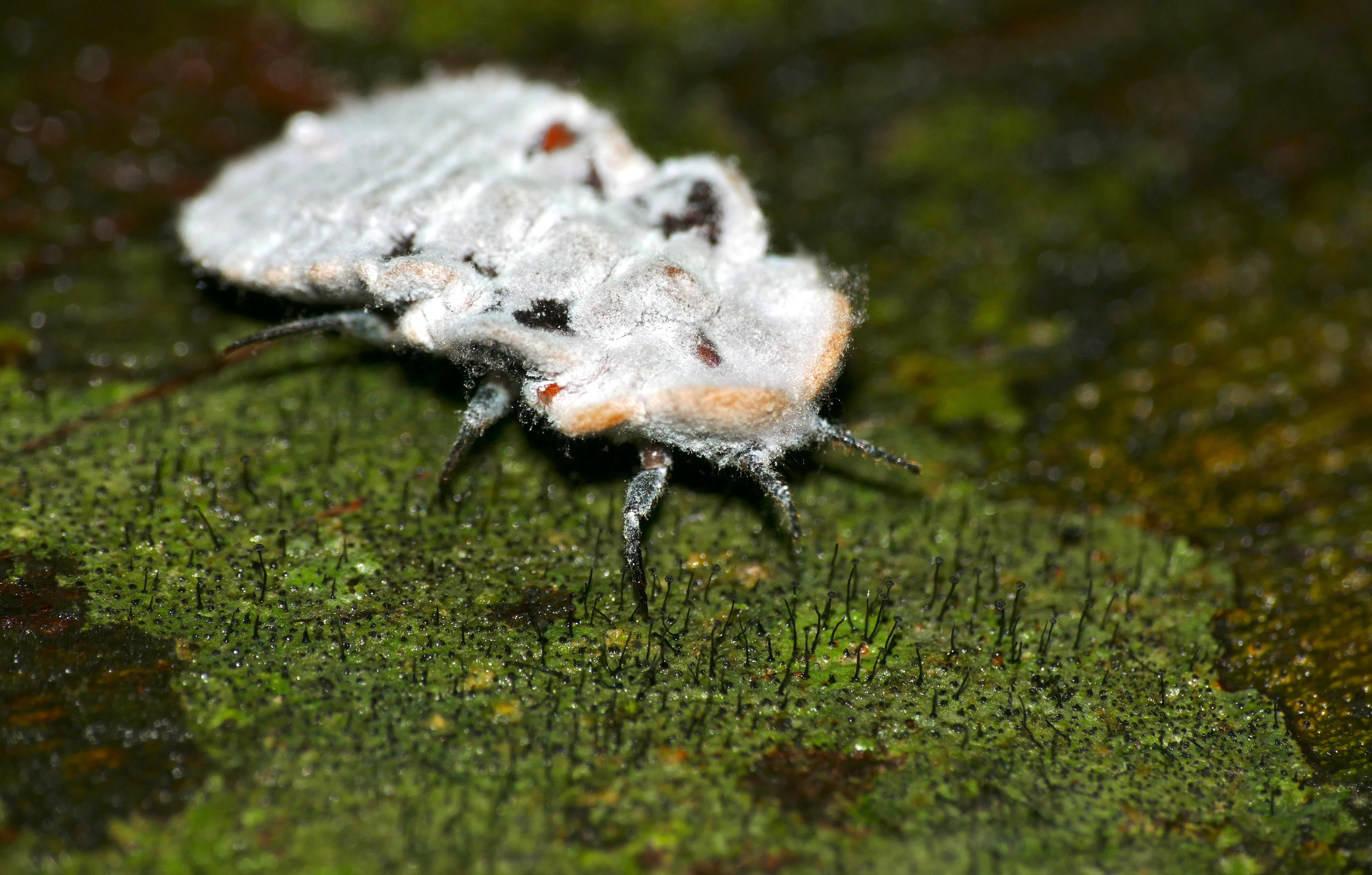
D. corpulenta male nymph.

D. corpulenta is native to eastern Asia. Its range includes Khabarovsk Krai and Primorsky Krai in the Russian Far East, the Chinese provinces of Anhui, Beijing, Fujian, Henan, Hubei, Hunan, Jiangsu, Liaoning, Nei Monggol, Shandong, Shanxi, Sichuan, Xingiang Uygur, Xizang, Yunnan and Zhejiang, as well as Hong Kong, Japan, North Korea and South Korea.

== Hosts ==
Like other scale insects, nymphs and adult females of D. corpulenta feed by sucking sap from the host plant. This species has been found feeding on plants in 30 genera in 22 families. These include a number of useful and ornamental trees and shrubs including Amelanchier asiatica, Malus prunifolia, Malus pumila, Prunus persica, Pseudocydonia sinensis, Sorbaria sorbifolia, Spiraea japonica, Castanea sativa, Castanopsis cuspidata, Lithocarpus glaber, Quercus acuta, Quercus dentata, Quercus mongolica, Quercus serrata, Acer barbinerve, Acer mono, Malvaviscus arboreus, Ficus carica and Cornus officinalis.

== Life cycle ==
Very few males are seen in contrast with the large numbers of females that infest the host trees. When the females are fully mature, they descend to the ground and lay their eggs in the leaf litter. In Japan there is a single generation each year, with both male and female adults emerging in April and May, and egg deposition occurring a month later.
