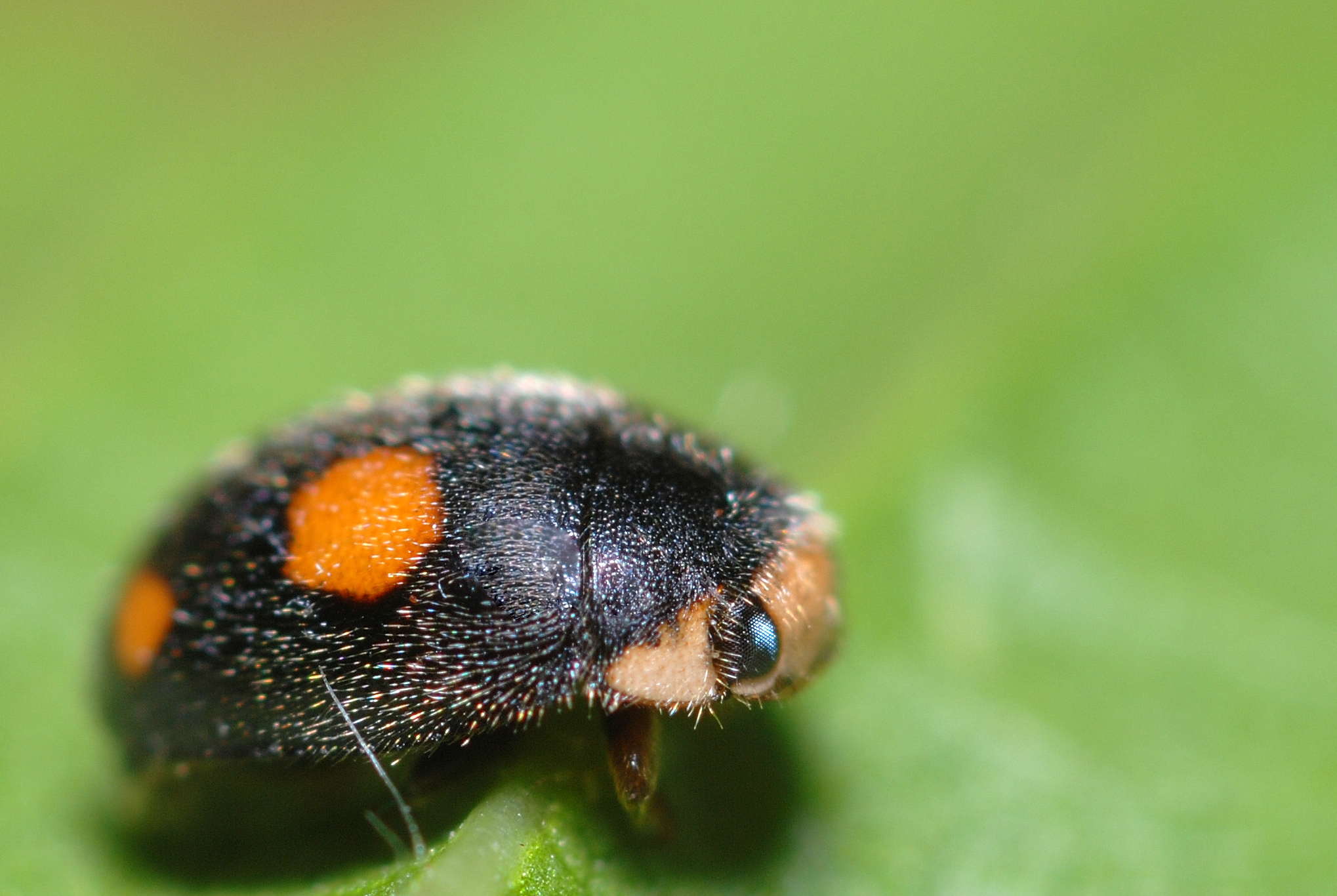
- Adult Platynaspis luteorubra

Scientific classification
- Kingdom: Animalia
- Phylum: Arthropoda
- Clade: Pancrustacea
- Class: Insecta
- Order: Coleoptera
- Suborder: Polyphaga
- Infraorder: Cucujiformia
- Family: Coccinellidae
- Tribe: Platynaspidini
- Genus: Platynaspis; L. Redtenbacher, 1843

= Platynaspis =

Genus of beetles

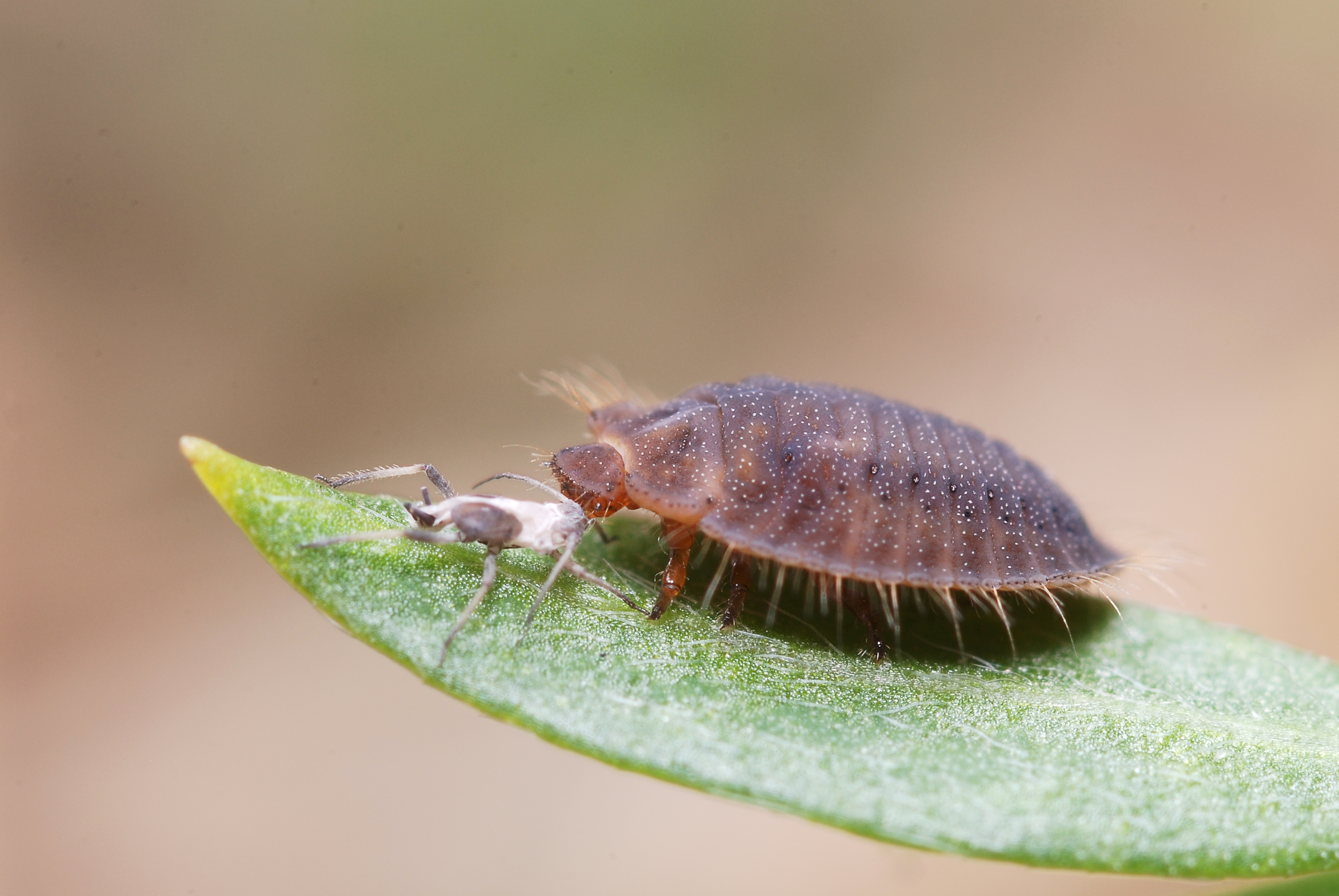
Platynaspis luteorubra larva

Platynaspis is a genus of beetle of the family Coccinellidae.

== Species ==
- Platynaspis bella Wollaston, 1864 (Canaries)
- Platynaspis bisignata Mulsant (Madagascar)
- Platynaspis bistripustulata (Ritsema, 1876)
- Platynaspis capicola Crotch, 1874 (Africa, Indian Ocean islands)
- Platynaspis flavoguttata (Gorham, 1894)
- Platynaspis litura Weise, 1891
- Platynaspis luteorubra (Goeze, 1777)
- Platynaspis mesomelas Klug, 1833
- Platynaspis nepalensis Canepari, 1997
- Platynaspis nigra (Weise, 1879)
- Platynaspis ocellimaculata Pang & Mao, 1979
- Platynaspis pilosa Sicard, 1930
- Platynaspis saundersii Crotch 1874
- Platynaspis rufipennis Gerstaecker, 1871
- Platynaspis solieri Mulsant (from Africa)
- Platynaspis trimaculata Weise, 1910
- Platynaspis usambarica Weise 1897
- Platynaspis villosa Fourcroy, 1785
