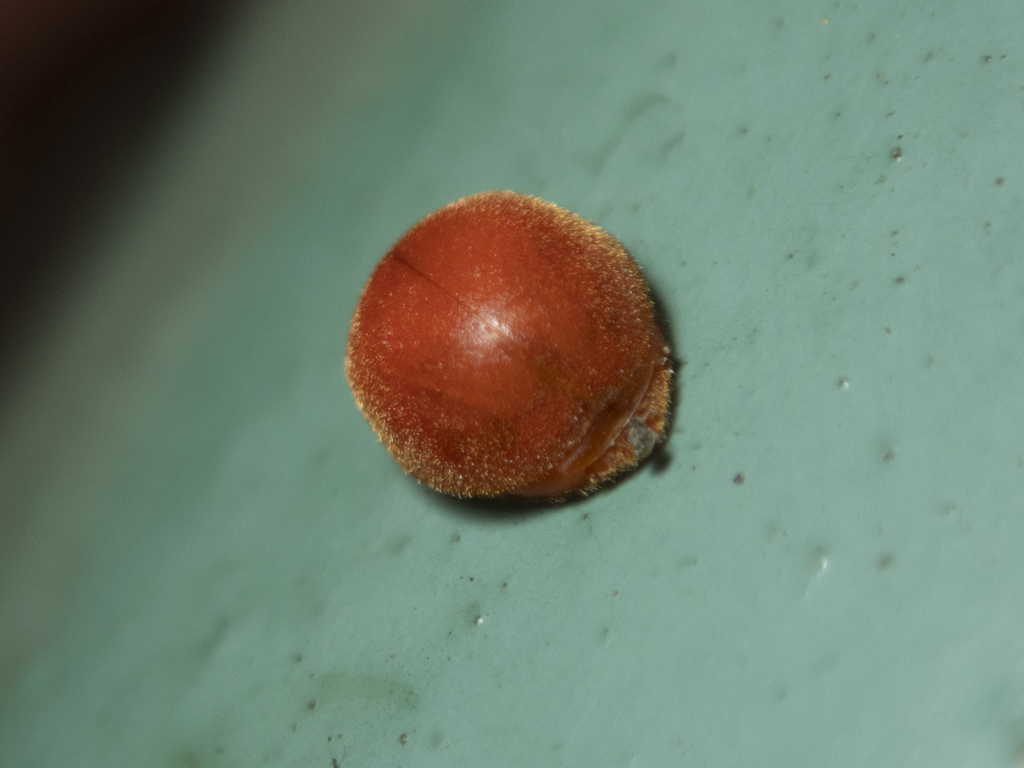

Scientific classification
- Kingdom: Animalia
- Phylum: Arthropoda
- Clade: Pancrustacea
- Class: Insecta
- Order: Coleoptera
- Suborder: Polyphaga
- Infraorder: Cucujiformia
- Family: Coccinellidae
- Genus: Novius
- Species: N. rufopilosus

Binomial name
- Novius rufopilosus (Mulsant, 1850)

Synonyms
- Rodolia rufopilosa Mulsant, 1850; Rodolia rowlandi Crotch, 1874

= Novius rufopilosus =

Species of beetle

Novius rufopilosus is a species of beetle of the family Coccinellidae. It is found in China (Shaanxi, Gansu, Xizang, Yunnan, Guizhou, Sichuan, Hubei, Hunan, Jiangsu, Zhejiang, Shanghai, Jiangxi, Fujian, Guangdong, Guangxi, Hainan, Hong Kong), Vietnam, Myanmar, India, the Philippines and Indonesia (Sumatra).
