= William Miles Maskell =

New Zealand farmer, politician and entomologist

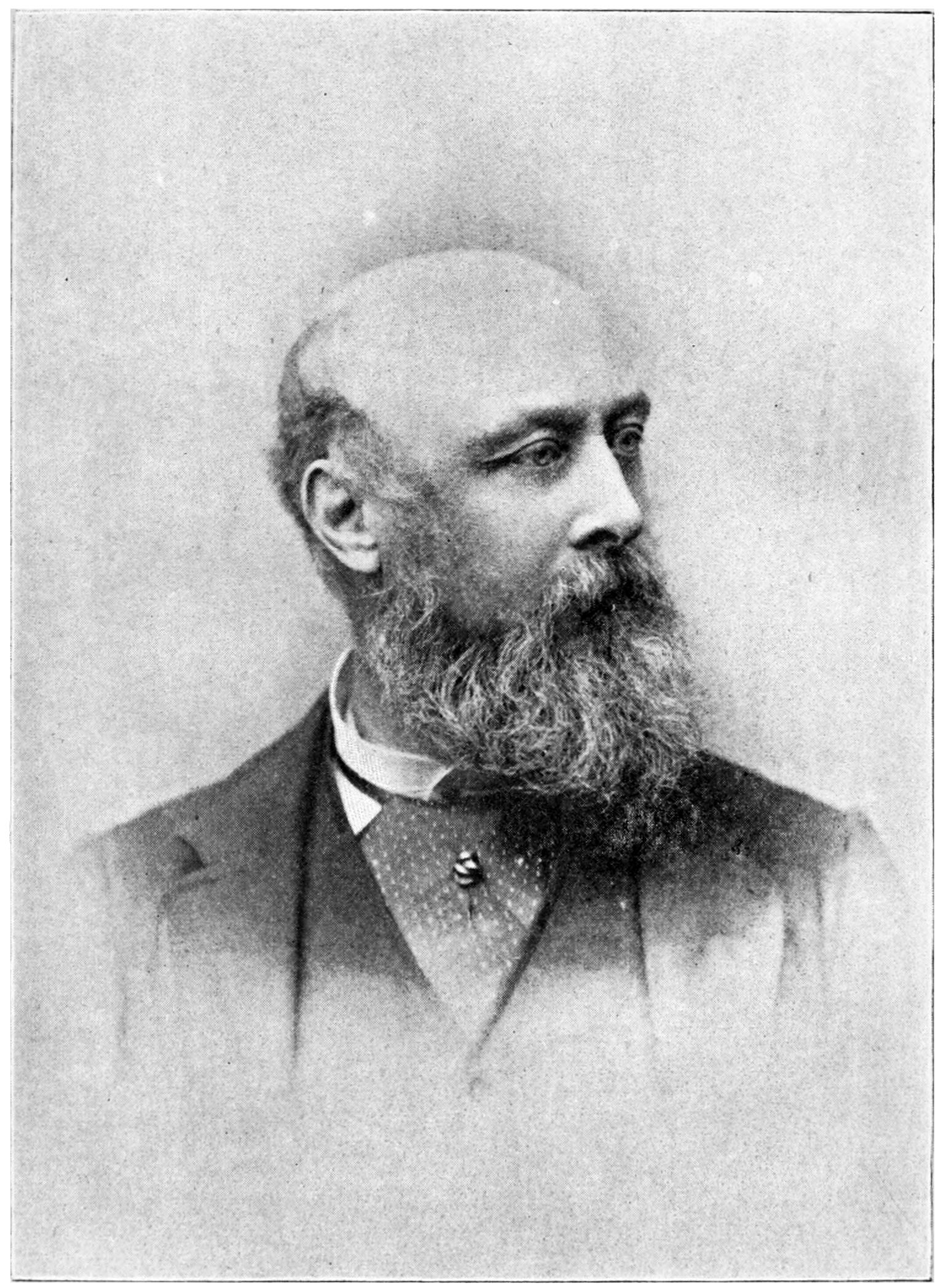

Registrar of the University of New Zealand
- In office 1876–1898

Member of the Canterbury Provincial Council
- In office 1866–1876

Personal details
- Born: 5 October 1839 Mapperton, Dorset, England
- Died: 1 May 1898 (aged 58)
- Occupation: farmer, politician, and entomologist

Military service
- Rank: ensign
- Unit: 11th Regiment of Foot

William Miles Maskell (5 October 1839 – 1 May 1898) was a New Zealand farmer, politician and entomologist.

== Early life ==
Born in Mapperton, Dorset, England, to Mary Scott and William Maskell, an Anglican clergyman, he attended school at St Mary's College in Oscott, Birmingham, and later in Paris, before being commissioned an ensign in the 11th Regiment of Foot with which he served for just under two years.

He first came to New Zealand to Lyttelton, in 1860 aboard William Miles. He eventually became involved in the political campaigns of Frederick Weld and Charles Clifford. He returned to England sometime between 1861 and 1863, but returned by September 1865, purchasing a 2,000-acre (8.1 km^{2}) property in Broadleaze near Leithfield, Canterbury a short while after.

He became registrar of the newly formed University of New Zealand in 1876 and held this position until his death.

Maskell was married to Lydia Cooper Brown on 15 September 1874 in two ceremonies, one Catholic and one Protestant. After Lydia's death in 1883, he married Alice Ann McClean in 1886.

== Political career ==
In 1866, Maskell was elected to represent Sefton on the Canterbury Provincial Council, a position which he held until the provinces were abolished in 1876. He also served as provincial secretary and treasurer during the last year on the council.

Maskell contested the Ashley electorate twice for a seat in the New Zealand parliament. On both occasions, first in the 1871 general election, and then in the 1876 general election, he was unsuccessful against John Evans Brown. After this, he took no further active part in politics.

== Entomology ==
Around 1873, Maskell became interested in entomology and wrote a book, An Account of the Insects Noxious to Agriculture and Plants in New Zealand, which mostly concerned pests in the Coccoidea family. Later, as his work became more well known, he was sent insect samples from a variety of locations, including Asia, Fiji, Hawaii and the Americas, which resulted in him proposing over 330 species names. Maskell's personal collection of Coccoidea specimens which was regarded as scientifically significant and was acquired by the New Zealand Department of Agriculture. In 1906, at the request of Dr C.L Marlett, Assistant Chief of the United States Bureau of Entomology, the collection was loaned to the Bureau for study by Emily R. Morrison. The collection was returned to the New Zealand Department of Agriculture in 1922 and is now housed at the New Zealand Arthropod Collection.

Maskell particularly liked studying the internal anatomy of insects, probably due to his fascination with physiology and microscopy, and his work was also unique in that he studied immature stages of males and females as well as the mature females.

After experimenting with kerosene application, Maskell became an advocate of biological control of pests, which involves finding their natural predators. He helped Albert Koebele of the United States Department of Agriculture collect vedalia "ladybird" beetles (Rodolia cardinalis), a predator of cottony cushion scale, which had become a devastating pest of Californian citrus farms. In its native Australia this pest was kept in check (so F. S. Crawford found) by a dipterous fly Cryptochetum iceryae which injected its eggs into the scale insect, which was then devoured by the resultant larvae.

Maskell also studied arthropods, protozoa and microscopic algae, publishing more than 70 research papers on these topics. He was also a strong opponent of Darwinism and his arguments helped to shape several scientific debates of the time.

== Death ==
Maskell died in Wellington on 1 May 1898 at his home from complications that arose after a serious operation. He was survived by his second wife, and he did not have any children.

== Bibliography ==
- An account of the insects noxious to agriculture and plants in New Zealand. The scale insects (Coccididæ) Wellington, N.Z. State Forests and Agricultural Dept.,1887.
