= Chnoodes felis =

Scientific classification
- Kingdom: Animalia
- Phylum: Arthropoda
- Clade: Pancrustacea
- Class: Insecta
- Order: Coleoptera
- Suborder: Polyphaga
- Infraorder: Cucujiformia
- Family: Coccinellidae
- Genus: Chnoodes
- Species: C. felis

Binomial name
- Chnoodes felis Churata & Almeida, 2026

Species of beetle

Chnoodes felis is a species of beetle of the family Coccinellidae. It is found in Peru.

== Description ==
Adults reach a length of about 3.03 mm (0.119 in). They have a rounded body with thin, short and yellowish pubescence. The integument is yellow with black spots and the head is black, but the antennae and mouthparts are yellow. The pronotum has a black central spot and the scutellar shield is triangular and black. The elytra are yellow with black spots, each with three irregular black spots. The legs are flattened yellowish.

== Etymology ==
The species name is derived from Latin felis and refers to the coloration pattern of the spots that resembles the face of a feline.
