= Novius sanguinolentus =

Scientific classification
- Kingdom: Animalia
- Phylum: Arthropoda
- Clade: Pancrustacea
- Class: Insecta
- Order: Coleoptera
- Suborder: Polyphaga
- Infraorder: Cucujiformia
- Family: Coccinellidae
- Genus: Novius
- Species: N. sanguinolentus

Binomial name
- Novius sanguinolentus Mulsant, 1850

Species of beetle

Novius sanguinolentus is a species of beetle of the family Coccinellidae. It is found in Australia (New South Wales, Western Australia, Queensland, Northern Territory).

== Description ==
Adults reach a length of about 2.2–3.5 mm (0.087–0.138 in). The colour pattern is variable. The head and pronotum are dark or with the anterior corners of the pronotum reddish. The elytra are testaceous or brown with a yellowish lateral margin in most specimens. Sometimes, specimens with two irregular transverse black stripes on a red background occur.
