= Novius sexmaculatus =

Scientific classification
- Kingdom: Animalia
- Phylum: Arthropoda
- Clade: Pancrustacea
- Class: Insecta
- Order: Coleoptera
- Suborder: Polyphaga
- Infraorder: Cucujiformia
- Family: Coccinellidae
- Genus: Novius
- Species: N. sexmaculatus

Binomial name
- Novius sexmaculatus (Korschefsky, 1940)

Synonyms
- Rodolia sexmaculata Korschefsky, 1940

Species of beetle

Novius sexmaculatus is a species of beetle of the family Coccinellidae. It is found in India (Uttarakhand, Uttar Pradesh).

== Description ==
Adults reach a length of about 3–3.45 mm (0.118–0.136 in). The dorsal surface is dull reddish brown, the pronotum with two black spots above the basal margin and the elytra with six black maculae.

== Life history ==
They have been recorded preying on Drosicha stebbingii.
