= Novius lindi =

Scientific classification
- Kingdom: Animalia
- Phylum: Arthropoda
- Clade: Pancrustacea
- Class: Insecta
- Order: Coleoptera
- Suborder: Polyphaga
- Infraorder: Cucujiformia
- Family: Coccinellidae
- Genus: Novius
- Species: N. lindi

Binomial name
- Novius lindi Blackburn, 1889

Species of beetle

Novius lindi is a species of beetle of the family Coccinellidae. It is found in Australia (Australian Capital Territory, New South Wales, Western Australia, Queensland).

== Description ==
Adults reach a length of about 2.5–3 mm (0.098–0.118 in). The colour pattern is variable. The head is black and the pronotum is dark or with the anterior part yellowish. The elytra are black with yellowish lateral margins and two pale spots in most specimens. However, melanic forms have elytra with variable amounts of black and may even be completely black.
