= Novius sexnotatus =

Scientific classification
- Kingdom: Animalia
- Phylum: Arthropoda
- Clade: Pancrustacea
- Class: Insecta
- Order: Coleoptera
- Suborder: Polyphaga
- Infraorder: Cucujiformia
- Family: Coccinellidae
- Genus: Novius
- Species: N. sexnotatus

Binomial name
- Novius sexnotatus (Mulsant, 1850)

Synonyms
- Epilachna sexnotata Mulsant, 1850; Vedalia guerinii Crotch, 1874; Rodolia immsi Weise, 1913

Species of beetle

Novius sexnotatus is a species of beetle of the family Coccinellidae. It is found in India (Karnataka, Madhya Pradesh, Uttarakhand, Uttar Pradesh, Tamil Nadu, Sikkim, Shivaliks), Pakistan, Bhutan, Nepal and China (Hong Kong).

== Description ==
Adults reach a length of about 4.8 mm (0.19 in). They are bright carmine red or reddish brown. The pronotum has two black spots on the posterior margin and each elytron has three black spots.

== Life history ==
They have been recorded preying on Icerya pilosa.
