= Chnoodes migueli =

Scientific classification
- Kingdom: Animalia
- Phylum: Arthropoda
- Clade: Pancrustacea
- Class: Insecta
- Order: Coleoptera
- Suborder: Polyphaga
- Infraorder: Cucujiformia
- Family: Coccinellidae
- Genus: Chnoodes
- Species: C. migueli

Binomial name
- Chnoodes migueli Churata & Duarte-de-Mélo, 2026

Species of beetle

Chnoodes migueli is a species of beetle of the family Coccinellidae. It is found in Brazil (São Paulo, Distrito Federal).

== Description ==
Adults reach a length of about 2.47–2.75 mm (0.097–0.108 in) for males and 2.66–2.8 mm (0.105–0.110 in) for females. They have an oval body, with fine and short yellowish pubescence. The head is black, with the antennae and mouthparts orangish. The pronotum is black without spots and the scutellar shield is black. The elytra are also black, but each with a central orangish subtriangular oblique spot, which starts just above the central region of the elytral disc and extends towards the elytral suture.

== Etymology ==
The species is named in honour of Dr. Miguel Angel Monné Barrios.
