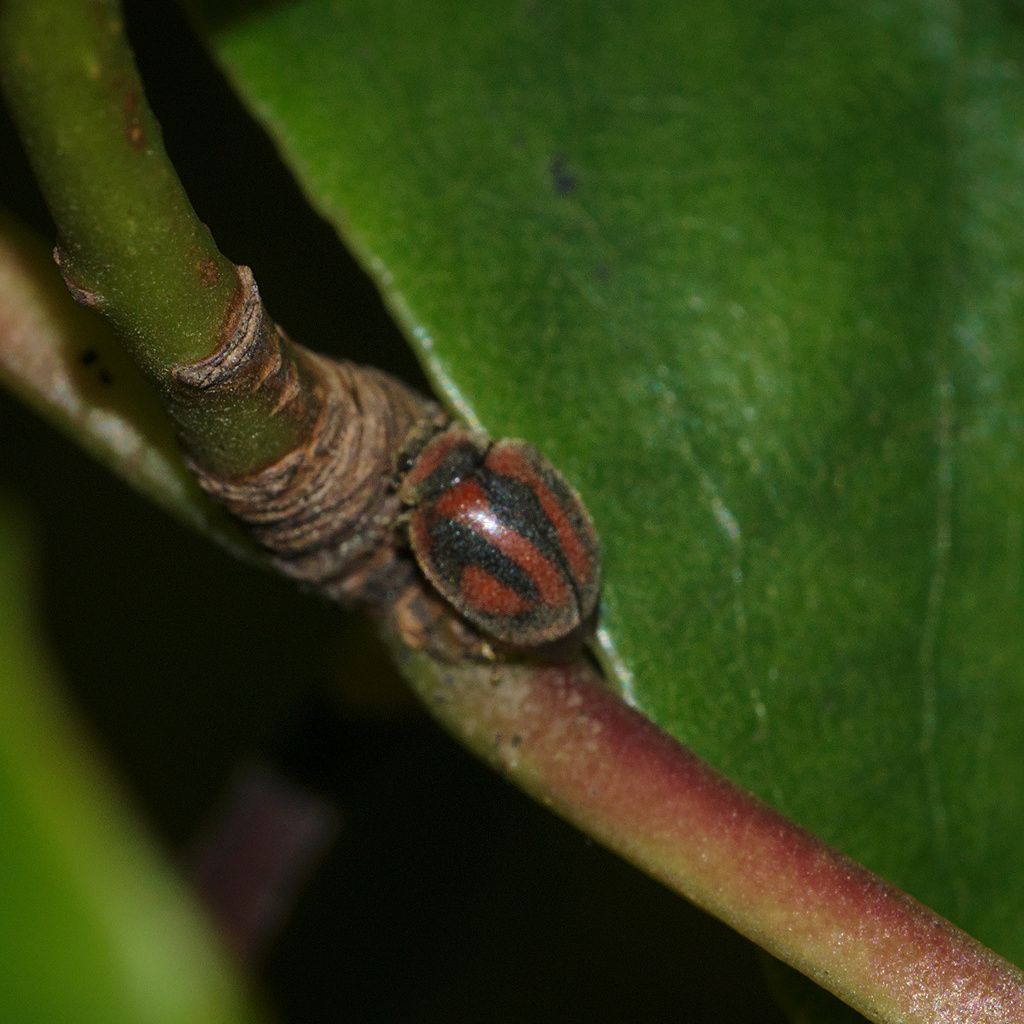

Scientific classification
- Kingdom: Animalia
- Phylum: Arthropoda
- Clade: Pancrustacea
- Class: Insecta
- Order: Coleoptera
- Suborder: Polyphaga
- Infraorder: Cucujiformia
- Family: Coccinellidae
- Genus: Novius
- Species: N. bellus

Binomial name
- Novius bellus Blackburn, 1889

Synonyms
- Eurodolia severini Weise, 1895; Novius immaculatus Lea, 1902

= Novius bellus =

Species of beetle

Novius bellus is a species of beetle of the family Coccinellidae. It is found in Australia (New South Wales, Queensland, Western Australia).

== Description ==
Adults reach a length of about 3.5–4 mm (0.14–0.16 in). The colour pattern is variable. The head and pronotum are dark or with the anterior part of the pronotum reddish. The elytra are red with a black sutural stripe and a forked stripe in most specimens. However, melanic forms with variable amounts of black on the elytra may be found, with some even being completely black.
