= Novius peruvianus =

Scientific classification
- Kingdom: Animalia
- Phylum: Arthropoda
- Clade: Pancrustacea
- Class: Insecta
- Order: Coleoptera
- Suborder: Polyphaga
- Infraorder: Cucujiformia
- Family: Coccinellidae
- Genus: Novius
- Species: N. peruvianus

Binomial name
- Novius peruvianus (Gordon, 1972)

Synonyms
- Anovia peruviana Gordon, 1972

Species of beetle

Novius peruvianus is a species of beetle of the family Coccinellidae. It is found in Peru.

== Description ==
Adults reach a length of about 4 mm. Adults are black.
