= Librella =

Scientific classification
- Domain: Eukaryota
- Kingdom: Animalia
- Phylum: Arthropoda
- Class: Insecta
- Order: Diptera
- Family: Cryptochetidae
- Genus: Librella; McAlpine, 1976
- Species: L. demetrius

Binomial name
- Librella demetrius McAlpine, 1976

Genus of flies

Librella is a genus of flies in the family Cryptochetidae. It is monotypic, being represented by the single species Librella demetrius.
