= Novius ruficollis =

Scientific classification
- Kingdom: Animalia
- Phylum: Arthropoda
- Clade: Pancrustacea
- Class: Insecta
- Order: Coleoptera
- Suborder: Polyphaga
- Infraorder: Cucujiformia
- Family: Coccinellidae
- Genus: Novius
- Species: N. ruficollis

Binomial name
- Novius ruficollis (Mulsant, 1850)

Synonyms
- Rodolia ruficollis Mulsant, 1850

Species of beetle

Novius ruficollis is a species of beetle of the family Coccinellidae. It is found in India (Assam, Tamil Nadu, West Bengal), Pakistan, Thailand and Vietnam.

== Description ==
Adults reach a length of about 5.8–6.1 mm (0.23–0.24 in). The dorsal surface is reddish, while the ventral surface is mostly reddish testaceous.

== Life history ==
They have been recorded preying on Icerya aegyptiaca.
