= William Miles (1853 ship) =

UK merchant and migrant ship (1853-1868)

History

United Kingdom
- Name: William Miles
- Builder: Charles Jobin, Quebec
- Launched: 1853
- Fate: Wrecked 20 May 1868

General characteristics
- Tons burthen: Old Act: 1227 (bm); New Act (post 1836): 1224 (bm)
- Length: 199 ft 3 in (60.7 m), or 196 ft 0 in (59.7 m)
- Beam: 35 ft 6 in (10.8 m), or 31 ft 8 in (9.7 m)
- Depth: 21 ft 8 in (6.6 m)

William Miles was launched at Quebec in 1853, but immediately transferred her registry to Bristol. She made several voyages carrying migrants to Australia and New Zealand. She was wrecked in May 1868.

== Career ==
William Miles first appeared in Lloyd's Register (LR) in 1854. She was sheathed in felt and yellow metal in 1854.

Year	Master	Owner	Trade	Source & Notes
1854	W.Thomson	Miles & Co.	Bristol–New Orleans	LR
1856	P.Erwin	Miles & Co.	Bristol–Australia	LR

In 1855 William Miles carried some 260 emigrants from Scotland to Moreton Bay, in what is now Queensland. She left England in 1854, arrived at Port Jackson on 16 January 1855, and arrived at Moreton Bay on 19 January.

William Miles sailed from Bristol on 5 May 1860 and arrived at Lyttelton, New Zealand on 21 August with 96 immigrants. She sailed on to Otago with merchandise and some passengers on 1 October.

Year	Master	Owner	Trade	Source & Notes
1862	Lilley	Miles & Co. Seymour	Bristol	LR; large repair 1860

William Miles, Brindsen, master, sailed from the Gravesend on 26 July 1862 with some 322, or 336 emigrants to New Zealand. She arrived on 12 November at Albertland. (Note: She carried at least 46 identified migrants. One of her passengers was the New Zealand farmer, politician, and entomologist William Miles Maskell.)

William Miles sailed from Gravesend, Kent on 3 July 1864. She arrived at Lyttelton on 22 October.

Year	Master	Owner	Trade	Source & Notes
1867	Polland	G.Seymour	Clyde; Liverpool	LR; large repair 1860, new keel and some repairs 1862, other repairs 1864, and felt & yellow metal sheathing 1866

== Fate ==
William Miles was wrecked on 20 May 1868 at Pensacola, Florida, United States. She was on a voyage from Pensacola to Queenstown, County Cork. She sank in 10 ft (3.0 m) of water just west of Fort Pickens.
