= Novius marginatus =

Scientific classification
- Kingdom: Animalia
- Phylum: Arthropoda
- Clade: Pancrustacea
- Class: Insecta
- Order: Coleoptera
- Suborder: Polyphaga
- Infraorder: Cucujiformia
- Family: Coccinellidae
- Genus: Novius
- Species: N. marginatus

Binomial name
- Novius marginatus (Bielawski, 1960)

Synonyms
- Rodolia marginata Bielawski, 1960

Species of beetle

Novius marginatus is a species of beetle of the family Coccinellidae. It is found in Nepal and Indonesia (Java).

== Description ==
Adults reach a length of about 2.35 mm (0.093 in). They are almost circular and have large brownish black maculae on the pronotum and elytra.
