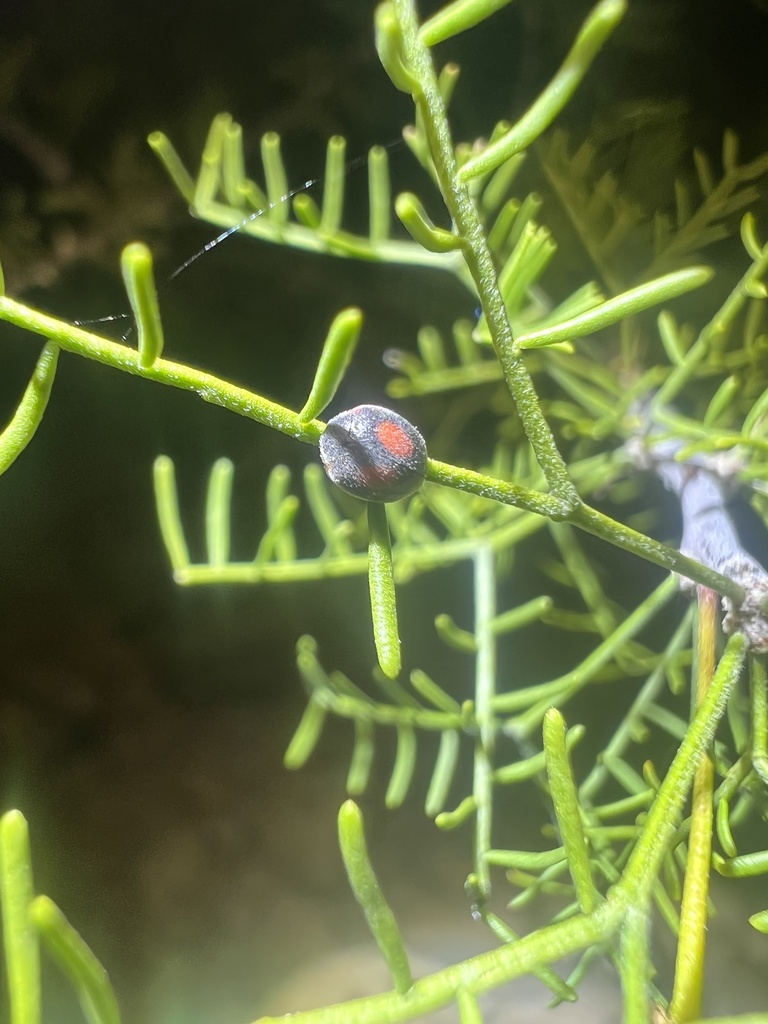

Scientific classification
- Kingdom: Animalia
- Phylum: Arthropoda
- Clade: Pancrustacea
- Class: Insecta
- Order: Coleoptera
- Suborder: Polyphaga
- Infraorder: Cucujiformia
- Family: Coccinellidae
- Genus: Novius
- Species: N. virginalis

Binomial name
- Novius virginalis (Wickham, 1905)

Synonyms
- Scymnus virginalis Wickham, 1905; Anovia virginalis (Wickham, 1905)

= Novius virginalis =

Species of beetle

Novius virginalis is a species of lady beetle in the family Coccinellidae, formerly placed in the genus Anovia. It is found in North America, where it has been recorded from Utah, Arizona, New Mexico and Texas.

== Description ==
Adults reach a length of about 2.43-3.05 mm. They have a red body, but anterior angle of the pronotum and head are piceous. The elytron has a median red spot and subhumeral red area.
