= Novius netara =

Scientific classification
- Kingdom: Animalia
- Phylum: Arthropoda
- Clade: Pancrustacea
- Class: Insecta
- Order: Coleoptera
- Suborder: Polyphaga
- Infraorder: Cucujiformia
- Family: Coccinellidae
- Genus: Novius
- Species: N. netara

Binomial name
- Novius netara (Kapur, 1949)

Synonyms
- Rodolia netara Kapur, 1949

Species of beetle

Novius netara is a species of beetle of the family Coccinellidae. It is found in India (Tamil Nadu).

== Description ==
Adults reach a length of about 3.25 mm (0.128 in). The dorsal surface is reddish brown with a darker head. There is a black discal spot on each elytron.
