= Arthur Maskell =

Australian rules footballer

Personal information
- Full name: Arthur Thomas Maskell
- Born: 28 March 1894; Tatura, Victoria
- Died: 16 June 1970 (aged 76); Heidelberg, Victoria
- Original team: Leongatha
- Height: 177 cm (5 ft 10 in)
- Weight: 78 kg (172 lb)

Playing career^{1}
Years	Club	Games (Goals)
1913	Melbourne	1 (0)
- ^{1} Playing statistics correct to the end of 1913.

Arthur Thomas Maskell (28 March 1894 – 16 June 1970) was an Australian rules footballer who played for the Melbourne Football Club in the Victorian Football League (VFL).

== Family ==
The son of Arthur Maskell (1849–1917), and Elizabeth Margaret Maskell (1856–1921), née Fuzzard, Arthur Thomas Maskell was born at Tatura, Victoria on 28 March 1894.

He married Teresa Daphne Duggan (1894–1967) on 21 October 1916. They had three children: Edna Jean Maskell (b.1917), Kevin Joseph Maskell (b.1921), and Marie Teresa Maskell (b.1929).

== Football ==
Recruited from Shepparton, he played on the half-back flank in his only senior VFL match for Melbourne, against University, at the MCG, on 28 June 1913, replacing the injured Norm McDougall.

McDougall was fit enough to play in the following match, Maskell was "dropped", and the Herald's football correspondent noted that "Maskell is not likely to play again with Melbourne".

Maskell returned to play in Shepparton's 1913 Goulburn Valley Football League's premiership.
