= Novius mexicanus =

Scientific classification
- Kingdom: Animalia
- Phylum: Arthropoda
- Clade: Pancrustacea
- Class: Insecta
- Order: Coleoptera
- Suborder: Polyphaga
- Infraorder: Cucujiformia
- Family: Coccinellidae
- Genus: Novius
- Species: N. mexicanus

Binomial name
- Novius mexicanus (Gordon, 1972)

Synonyms
- Anovia mexicana Gordon, 1972

Species of beetle

Novius mexicanus is a species of beetle of the family Coccinellidae. It is found in Mexico (Guerrero, Morelos).

== Description ==
Adults reach a length of about 3–4 mm. Adults are black, while the lateral margin of the pronotum is red. The elytron has a small red spot.
