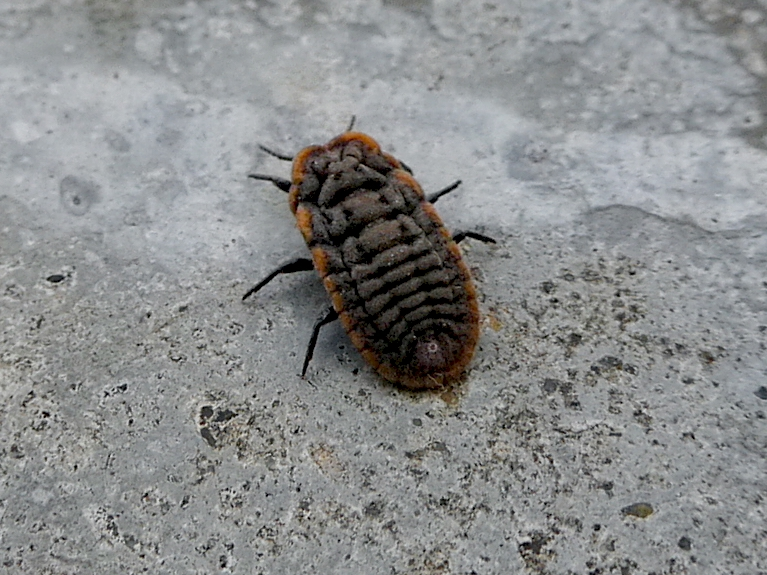
- Female Drosicha corpulenta

Scientific classification
- Kingdom: Animalia
- Phylum: Arthropoda
- Class: Insecta
- Order: Hemiptera
- Suborder: Sternorrhyncha
- Family: Monophlebidae
- Genus: Drosicha; Walker, 1858

Synonyms
- Drosycha Signoret, 1876; Villigera Karsch, 1877; Monophlebus (Drosicha) Walker, 1858; Cockerellella MacGillivray, 1921; Greenella MacGillivray, 1921; Greenacoccus MacGillivray, 1921; Greeniella MacGillivray, 1921; Warajicoccus Kuwana, 1922; Drosiche Kuwana, 1931

= Drosicha =

Genus of insects

Drosicha is a genus of true bugs belonging to the family Monophlebidae. The species of this genus are found in Eurasia.

Species:

- Drosicha afganica Jashenko, 1994
- Drosicha burmeisteri (Westwood, 1845)
- Drosicha contrahens Walker, 1858
- Drosicha corpulenta (Kuwana, 1902)
- Drosicha dalbergiae (Stebbing, 1902)
- Drosicha frauenfeldi (Karsch, 1877)
- Drosicha howardi (Kuwana, 1922)
- Drosicha jujubae (Buckton, 1883)
- Drosicha koreiensis Jashenko, 1994
- Drosicha leachii (Westwood, 1845)
- Drosicha littorea Beardsley, 1966
- Drosicha malaysiensis Foldi, 2016
- Drosicha mangiferae (Stebbing, 1903)
- Drosicha maskelli (Cockerell, 1902)
- Drosicha minor Reyne, 1965
- Drosicha palavanica Cockerell, 1916
- Drosicha philippinensis (Green, 1924)
- Drosicha pinicola (Kuwana, 1922)
- Drosicha quadricaudata (Green, 1922)
- Drosicha saundersii (Westwood, 1845)
- Drosicha stebbingii (Stebbing, 1902)
- Drosicha sumatrensis Green, 1930
- Drosicha townsendi (Cockerell, 1905)
- Drosicha turkestanica Archangelskaya, 1931
- Drosicha variegata (Green, 1922)
