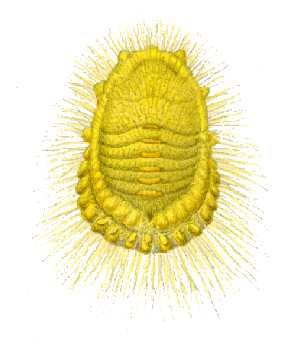
- Icerya seychellarum, female

Scientific classification
- Domain: Eukaryota
- Kingdom: Animalia
- Phylum: Arthropoda
- Class: Insecta
- Order: Hemiptera
- Suborder: Sternorrhyncha
- Superfamily: Coccoidea
- Family: Monophlebidae; Signoret

Genera
- See text

= Monophlebidae =

Family of true bugs

Monophlebidae is a family of scale insects commonly known as the giant scales or monophlebids. They occur in most parts of the world but more genera are found in the tropics than elsewhere.

The cottony cushion scale, Icerya purchasi, is a serious commercial pest on many families of woody plants, including Citrus. It has spread worldwide from Australia.

== Taxonomy ==
At one time, Monophlebidae was considered to be a subfamily of Margarodidae. However the family Margarodidae showed great morphological and biological variation and Maskell first recognised Monophlebidae as a separate family in 1880. The giant scales are morphologically diverse but they appear to be a monophyletic group.

== Hosts ==
Giant scales occur on a wide range of host plants but most of these are trees or woody shrubs.

== Description ==
Giant scales have an elongated oval body; many species grow to a length of one centimetre long and the African species Aspidoproctus maximus achieves 35 mm long. The adult females of the family have six dark coloured legs and conspicuous antennae. Most genera have a waxy coating but some do not. Various species have some form of ovisac or marsupium.

== Life cycle ==
Giant scales infest the stems, branches and leaves of their host plant. They mostly have four female and five male instars. The prepupal instar are mobile, unlike most members of other scale families. They may have wing buds and the legs and antennae are well developed.

== Genera ==
- Afrodrosicha
- Aspidoproctus
- Buchnericoccus
- Conifericoccus
- Corandesia
- Crypticerya
- Drosicha
- Drosichoides
- Echinicerya
- Etropera
- Gigantococcus
- Gueriniella
- Gullania
- Hemaspidoproctus
- Icerya
- Insulococcus
- Jansenus
- Labioproctus
- Laurencella
- Lecaniodrosicha
- Llaveia
- Llaveiella
- Matesovia
- Melaleucococcus
- Misracoccus
- Modicicoccus
- Monophlebidus
- Monophleboides
- Monophlebulus
- Monophlebus
- Nautococcus
- Neogreenia
- Neohodgsonius
- Nietnera
- Nodulicoccus
- Palaeococcus
- Paracoelostoma
- Paramoandesia
- Peengea
- Perissopneumon
- Protortonia
- Pseudaspidoproctus
- Sishania
- Steatococcus
- Tessarobelus
- Vrydagha
- Walkeriana

== See also ==
- Drosicha corpulenta
- Icerya purchasi
