= Novius fulvescens =

Scientific classification
- Kingdom: Animalia
- Phylum: Arthropoda
- Clade: Pancrustacea
- Class: Insecta
- Order: Coleoptera
- Suborder: Polyphaga
- Infraorder: Cucujiformia
- Family: Coccinellidae
- Genus: Novius
- Species: N. fulvescens

Binomial name
- Novius fulvescens (Hoang, 1980)

Synonyms
- Rodolia fulvescens Hoang, 1980

Species of beetle

Novius fulvescens is a species of beetle of the family Coccinellidae. It is found in India (Assam, Andaman Islands), Bangladesh and Vietnam.

== Description ==
Adults reach a length of about 2.1–2.6 mm (0.083–0.102 in). The dorsal and ventral surface are yellowish to paler orange yellow.

== Life history ==
They have been recorded preying on scale insects.
