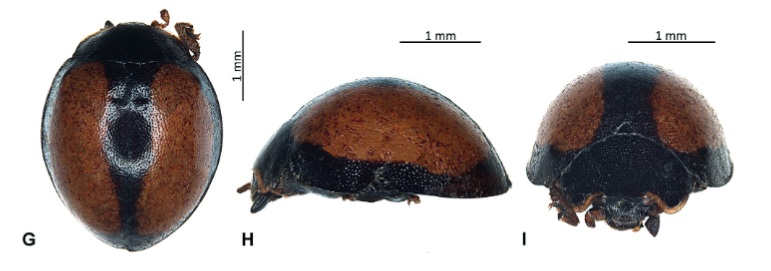

Scientific classification
- Kingdom: Animalia
- Phylum: Arthropoda
- Clade: Pancrustacea
- Class: Insecta
- Order: Coleoptera
- Suborder: Polyphaga
- Infraorder: Cucujiformia
- Family: Coccinellidae
- Genus: Chnoodes
- Species: C. yanayacu

Binomial name
- Chnoodes yanayacu Szawaryn & Czerwiński, 2022

= Chnoodes yanayacu =

Species of beetle

Chnoodes yanayacu is a species of beetle of the family Coccinellidae. It is found in Ecuador.

== Description ==
Adults reach a length of about 3.20 mm. The dorsum is black with one big, chestnut brown spot on the elytron and light brown anterolateral edges of the pronotum. The dorsum is covered with short hairs, forming a weak, wavy pattern on the elytra. The dorsum has single size punctures, while the punctures on the elytra are less coarse than on the head and pronotum.

== Etymology ==
The species is named after the Yanayacu biological station in Ecuador where the type series was collected.
