= Novius nigrofrontalis =

Scientific classification
- Kingdom: Animalia
- Phylum: Arthropoda
- Clade: Pancrustacea
- Class: Insecta
- Order: Coleoptera
- Suborder: Polyphaga
- Infraorder: Cucujiformia
- Family: Coccinellidae
- Genus: Novius
- Species: N. nigrofrontalis

Binomial name
- Novius nigrofrontalis (Kapur, 1951)

Synonyms
- Rodolia nigrofrontalis Kapur, 1951

Species of beetle

Novius nigrofrontalis is a species of beetle of the family Coccinellidae. It is found in India (Kerala).

== Description ==
Adults reach a length of about 3–3.2 mm (0.12–0.13 in). The head is piceous, while the rest of the dorsal surface is reddish brown with a slight tinge of carmine, The antennae and mouthparts are reddish brown.
