= Novius weisei =

Scientific classification
- Kingdom: Animalia
- Phylum: Arthropoda
- Clade: Pancrustacea
- Class: Insecta
- Order: Coleoptera
- Suborder: Polyphaga
- Infraorder: Cucujiformia
- Family: Coccinellidae
- Genus: Novius
- Species: N. weisei

Binomial name
- Novius weisei (Gordon, 1972)

Synonyms
- Anovia weisei Gordon, 1972

Species of beetle

Novius weisei is a species of beetle of the family Coccinellidae. It is found in Guatemala.

== Description ==
Adults reach a length of about 4 mm. Adults are yellowish red, but the median one-third of the pronotum is black. The elytron is reddish purple.
