= Novius bipunctatus =

Scientific classification
- Kingdom: Animalia
- Phylum: Arthropoda
- Clade: Pancrustacea
- Class: Insecta
- Order: Coleoptera
- Suborder: Polyphaga
- Infraorder: Cucujiformia
- Family: Coccinellidae
- Genus: Novius
- Species: N. bipunctatus

Binomial name
- Novius bipunctatus (Gorham, 1895)

Synonyms
- Chnoodes bipunctata Gorham, 1895; Chnoodes bipunctatus; Anovia bipunctata

Species of beetle

Novius bipunctatus is a species of beetle of the family Coccinellidae. It is found in Mexico (Guerrero).
