= Mango mealybug =

Scientific classification
- Kingdom: Animalia
- Phylum: Arthropoda
- Class: Insecta
- Order: Hemiptera
- Suborder: Sternorrhyncha
- Family: Monophlebidae
- Genus: Drosicha
- Species: D. mangiferae

Binomial name
- Drosicha mangiferae Stebbins, 1903

Species of scale insect that attacks mangos

The mango mealybug (Drosicha mangiferae) is a pest of mango crops in Asia. The nymphs and females suck plant sap from inflorescences, tender leaves, shoots and fruit peduncles. As a result, the infested inflorescences dry up, affects the fruit set, causing fruit drop. These bugs also exude honey dew over the mango tree leaves, on which sooty mold fungus develops reducing the photosynthetic efficiency of the tree. It is a polyphagous pest and is found on over 60 other plant species. Despite its name, it is not a true mealybug (family Pseudococcidae) but rather a member of the Monophlebidae.

== Life cycle ==
In Pakistan, Drosicha mangiferae is univoltine and has a total lifecycle of 78–135 days. Between April and May, purple-colored eggs are laid in egg-sacs consisting of a mass of wax threads, in the loose soil around (within 2–3 m radius) the infested mango trees. Eggs hatch in December–January and nymphs start ascending the trees to succulent shoots and the bases of fruiting parts. Nymphs go through stages of 1st instar (45–71 days), 2nd instar (18–38 days) and 3rd instar (15–26 days). Female and male appearance starts during March–April. Males are winged and short-lived after mating, and do not cause damage to the trees.

== Control of mango mealybug ==
There is a range of cultural, chemical and non-chemical techniques for minimizing damage to the mango crop, for example the use of physical barriers to stop Drosicha mangiferae nymphs crawling up the stem of mango trees, by wrapping plastic sheets or sticky bands (sometimes impregnated with insecticide) around the tree stem. biological control: Encurage natural enimes Sumnius rendari ( predatory leaf bird)

== See also ==
- Mealybug
- Mango
