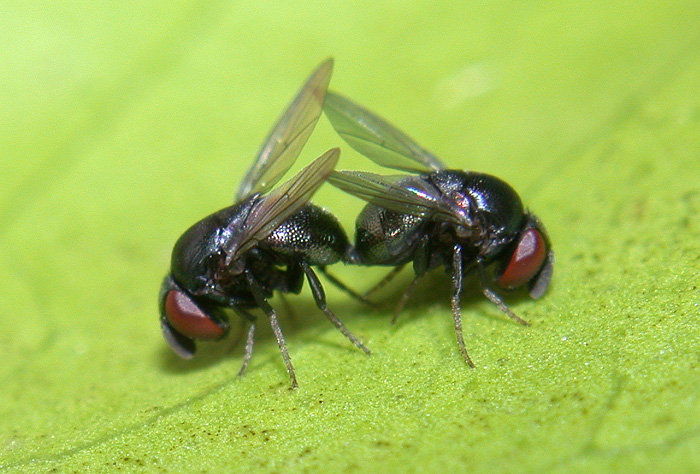
- Cryptochetid flies mating

Scientific classification
- Domain: Eukaryota
- Kingdom: Animalia
- Phylum: Arthropoda
- Class: Insecta
- Order: Diptera
- Section: Schizophora
- Subsection: Acalyptratae
- Superfamily: Lonchaeoidea
- Family: Cryptochetidae; Brues & Melander, 1932

= Cryptochetidae =

Family of flies

The Cryptochetidae are a small family of tiny flies (generally 2 to 4 mm long). Some twenty to thirty species are known. Generally they are metallic blue black, stoutly built, with the head broad and high and with clear wings. Like other species in the superfamily Lonchaeoidea, the Cryptochetidae have antennae with a cleft in the second segment. Unlike practically all Schizophora however, they lack an arista, or if they do have one, it is too small to distinguish with any confidence. The family name refers to this unusual distinction; "Cryptochetidae" literally means "those with hidden bristles". The adult flies also are unusual among insects in that they have only a single pair of abdominal spiracles — this is not a serious physiological challenge in such small insects.

Again in resemblance to other Lonchaeoidea, the Cryptochetidae do not have more than one proclinate orbital bristle on each side. The frons is densely setulose. The costa has a break at the end of the subcosta. The sixth abdominal sternite in the male is symmetrical and it has an 8th tergite. In the female the seventh tergite and sternite are fused, and the eighth segment is elongated.

The larvae are of biological and economic interest, being endoparasitoids of coccids. In Cryptochetum iceryae, which parasitizes Icerya, there are four larval instars. The first instar is sac-like and lacks both trophi and tracheae but at the caudal end it bears a pair of finger-like processes. The caudal end of the digestive tract is closed. During subsequent instars the caudal processes grow longer and become filamentous; in the final instar they are much longer than the whole body. These filaments probably are respiratory organs. Only a few species of Cryptochetidae have been described, and most of those occur in tropical countries. At one time they were allocated to the Agromyzidae but now are regarded as a separate family.

== Genera ==
These three genera belong to the family Cryptochetidae:

- Cryptochetum Rondani, 1875
- Librella McAlpine, 1976
- Phanerochaetum Hennig, 1965
