= Platynaspis bistripustulata =

Scientific classification
- Kingdom: Animalia
- Phylum: Arthropoda
- Clade: Pancrustacea
- Class: Insecta
- Order: Coleoptera
- Suborder: Polyphaga
- Infraorder: Cucujiformia
- Family: Coccinellidae
- Genus: Platynaspis
- Species: P. bistripustulata

Binomial name
- Platynaspis bistripustulata (Ritsema, 1876)

Synonyms
- Chnoodes bistripustulata Ritsema, 1876

Species of beetle

Platynaspis bistripustulata is a species of beetle of the family Coccinellidae. It is found in Indonesia (Sumatra).
