= William Maskell =

Anglican cleric, Roman Catholic convert and liturgical scholar (1814–1890)

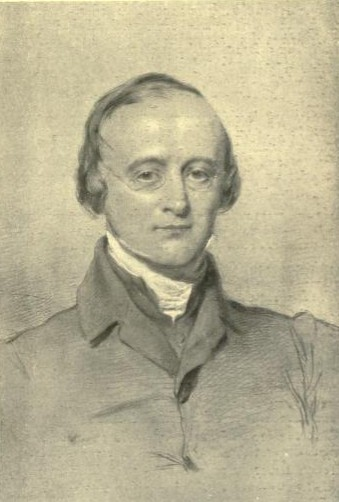

Personal life
- Born: 7 May 1814 Shepton Mallet, England
- Died: 12 April 1890 (aged 75) Penzance, England
- Education: University College, Oxford

Religious life
- Church: Church of England; Catholic Church
- Ordination: 1837

William Maskell (1814–1890) was an English priest of the Church of England, liturgical scholar, and Catholic convert.

== Life ==
He was only son of William Maskell, a solicitor of Shepton Mallet, Somerset, and his wife Mary Miles, born 17 May 1814. The family moved to Bath in 1823. He matriculated on 9 June 1832 at University College, Oxford, graduating B.A. in 1836, and M.A. in 1838, having taken holy orders in 1837.

From an extreme High Church position, Maskell attacked in 1840 Edward Stanley, a latitudinarian, over subscription to the Thirty Nine Articles. His father William died in 1841. In 1842 he was instituted to the rectory of Corscombe, Dorset, and concentrated on research into the history of Anglican ritual. Having resigned Corscombe, he was instituted in 1847 to the vicarage of St Mary Church, Torquay, and appointed domestic chaplain to Henry Phillpotts, the Bishop of Exeter.

For Phillpotts, Maskell conducted the examination of George Cornelius Gorham on his views of baptism, when Gorham was being considered for presentation to the vicarage of Brampford Speke, near Exeter. The Gorham case was escalated through the courts to the Privy Council. Soon afterwards Maskell resigned his living, and was received into the Roman Catholic Church.

Not taking Catholic orders, and indeed unable to do so after his second marriage in 1852, Maskell spent most of his later life in retirement at The Castle in Bude, Cornwall. His father's fortune allowed him to retire in that way. Robert Stephen Hawker, a good friend, was nearby with the living at Morwenstow. When Hawker died in 1875, his widow Pauline presented Maskell with evidence that Hawker was only kept from a Catholic conversion by the economic imperative of retaining his clerical income. Maskell asked her not to disclose it.

Maskell played the part of the country gentleman with antiquarian pursuits. He had a large library of patristic literature, and collected medieval service books, enamels and carvings in ivory, which he housed in his private chapel there; He also sold to & made museum donations, see British Museum, V&A museum for examples of his collection. He was a Justice of the Peace, and a deputy-lieutenant for Cornwall. He died in Newlyn, near Penzance on 12 April 1890.

== Views ==
Maskell's views of baptism and the Eucharist were set out in his 1849 volume of sermons. A believer in the Catholic doctrine of the immaculate conception of the Virgin Mary, Maskell regretted its definition by Pope Pius IX in 1854. He acquiesced only with reluctance in the decree of Vatican I defining the dogma of papal infallibility.

== Works ==
Maskell published:

- A Letter to the Clergy upon the Speech of the Right Rev. the Lord Bishop of Norwich in the House of Lords, 20 May 1840, by a Priest of the Church of England, London, 1840.
- Ancient Liturgy of the Church of England according to the Uses of Sarum, Bangor, York, and Hereford, and the Modern Roman Liturgy, arranged in parallel columns, London 1844, 2nd edit. 1846; 3rd edit. 1882.
- A History of the Martin Marprelate Controversy in the Time of Queen Elizabeth, London, 1845.
- Monumenta Ritualia Ecclesiæ Anglicanre, or Occasional Offices of the Church of England according to the Ancient Use of Salisbury, the Prymer in English, and other Prayers and Forms, with Dissertations and Notes, London, 1846, 3 vols.; 2nd edit. Oxford, 1882.
- Holy Baptism: a Dissertation, London, 1848.
- Sermons preached in the Parish Church of St. Mary,' London, 1849.
- An Enquiry into the Doctrine of the Church of England upon Absolution, London, 1849 justifying a revival of the confessional.
- A First Letter on the Present Position of the High Church Party in the Church of England, London, 1850, disputing the authority of the Privy Council in the Gorham case;, and A Second Letter, London, 1850, deploring its decision.
- Letter to the Rev. Dr. Pusey on his receiving Persons in Auricular Confession, London, 1850; on the occasion of his leaving the Church of England.
- Budehaven; a Pen-and-ink Sketch, with Portraits of the principal Inhabitants, London, 1863, reprinted, with other pieces, as Odds and Ends, London, 1872.
- Letter to the Editor of the Dublin Review upon the Temporal Power of the Pope and his personal Infallibility, London, 1869.
- The Present Position of the High-Church Party in the Established Church of England London, 1869, a review of the Rev. James Wayland Joyce's The Civil Power in its Relation to the Church, with a reprint of his two letters published in 1850.
- What is the meaning of the late Definition on the Infallibility of the Pope? London, 1871, pamphlet.
- Protestant Ritualists, London, 1872, pamphlet reprinted from The Tablet on the Privy Council case Sheppard v. Bennett, and the High Church party in the Church of England.

For the Committee of Council on Education, Maskell edited in 1872 A Description of the Ivories, Ancient and Modern, in the South Kensington Museum,' with a preface reprinted separately as Ivories Ancient and Mediæval in 1875. The Industrial Arts, Historical Sketches, with numerous Illustrations, 1876, anonymous, was also for the Committee of Council on Education, London, 1876. He printed privately a catalogue of rare books in his library, as Selected Centuries of Books from the Library of a Priest in the Diocese of Salisbury, Chiswick, 1848, and a Catalogue of Books used in and relating to the public services of the Church of England during the sixteenth and seventeenth centuries, 1845.

== Family ==
Maskell married twice, but had children only with his first wife Mary Scott, daughter of Thomas Scott of Bath; she died in 1847. They had a daughter Mary Louisa Florence and three sons, William Miles Maskell, Alfred Ogle Maskell the writer, art historian and photographer, and Stuart Eaton Maskell a solicitor. His second marriage was in 1852, to Monique Theresa Stein, only daughter of John Stein of Dorset.

== Notes ==
Fraser, Iain, additional notes(Sept 2021).

Attribution This article incorporates text from a publication now in the public domain: Lee, Sidney, ed. (1893). "Maskell, William". Dictionary of National Biography. Vol. 36. London: Smith, Elder & Co.
