= Norm McDougall =

Australian rules footballer

Personal information
- Full name: Norman McDougall
- Born: 23 April 1892; Richmond, Victoria
- Died: 10 February 1938 (aged 45); Mosman, New South Wales
- Original team: Beverley

Playing career^{1}
Years	Club	Games (Goals)
1913	Melbourne	10 (1)
- ^{1} Playing statistics correct to the end of 1913.

Norm McDougall (23 April 1892 – 10 February 1938) was an Australian rules footballer who played with Melbourne in the Victorian Football League (VFL).
