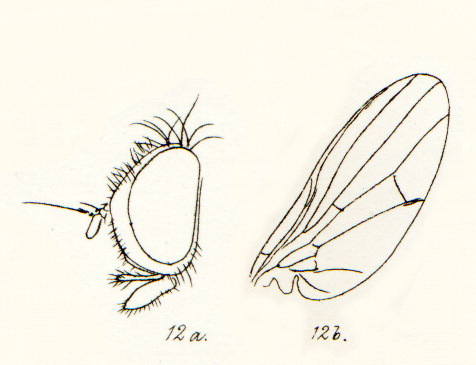
- Wing venation and lateral aspect of head of Lonchaea chorea, family Lonchaeidae

Scientific classification
- Kingdom: Animalia
- Phylum: Arthropoda
- Class: Insecta
- Order: Diptera
- Suborder: Brachycera
- Infraorder: Muscomorpha
- Clade: Eremoneura
- (unranked): Cyclorrhapha
- Section: Schizophora
- Subsection: Acalyptratae
- Superfamily: Lonchaeoidea; G. C. Griffiths, 1972

= Lonchaeoidea =

Superfamily of flies

The Lonchaeoidea are a superfamily of generally small or very small black flies with large heads. It contains two families, the Lonchaeidae (lance flies) and the Cryptochetidae. The superfamily was established by G. C. Griffiths in 1972 and came into general use as such.

Characteristics of the Lonchaeoidea include antennae with the second segment cleft, and not more than one proclinate orbital bristle on each side. The frons is densely setulose.
