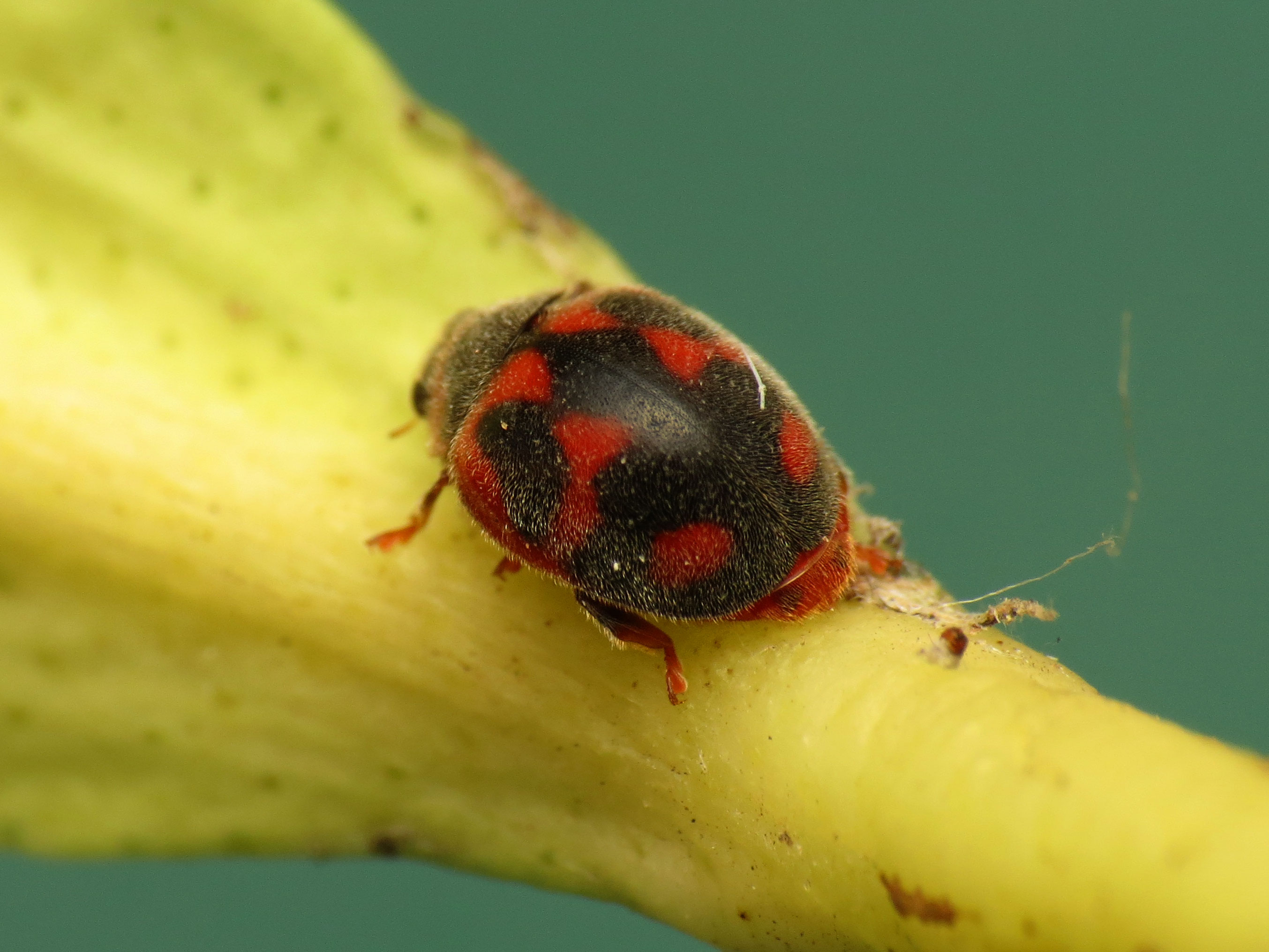

Scientific classification
- Kingdom: Animalia
- Phylum: Arthropoda
- Clade: Pancrustacea
- Class: Insecta
- Order: Coleoptera
- Suborder: Polyphaga
- Infraorder: Cucujiformia
- Family: Coccinellidae
- Subfamily: Coccinellinae
- Tribe: Noviini
- Genus: Novius
- Species: N. cardinalis

Binomial name
- Novius cardinalis (Mulsant, 1850)

Synonyms
- Vedalia cardinalis Mulsant, 1850; Rodolia cardinalis (Mulsant, 1850); Rodolia aegyptiaca Sicard, 1907; Macronovius cardinalis ab. obnubilatus Weise, 1922

= Novius cardinalis =

Species of beetle

Novius cardinalis (common names vedalia beetle or cardinal ladybird) is a species of ladybird beetle native to Australia. It was formerly placed in the genus Vedalia then renamed to Rodolia, but that genus was synonymized under the genus Novius in 2020. The "vedalia beetle" came to public attention as an effective biological control agent against cottony cushion scale, a serious pest of citrus plantations.

== Description ==
The adult has a domed oval body, flattened underneath, 2.5–4 millimetres (0.10–0.16 in) long, covered with dense, short hairs. Its coloration is an irregular and variable pattern of red and black, sometimes with more red, sometimes with more black. The head, the back of the prothorax, and the scutellum are all black.

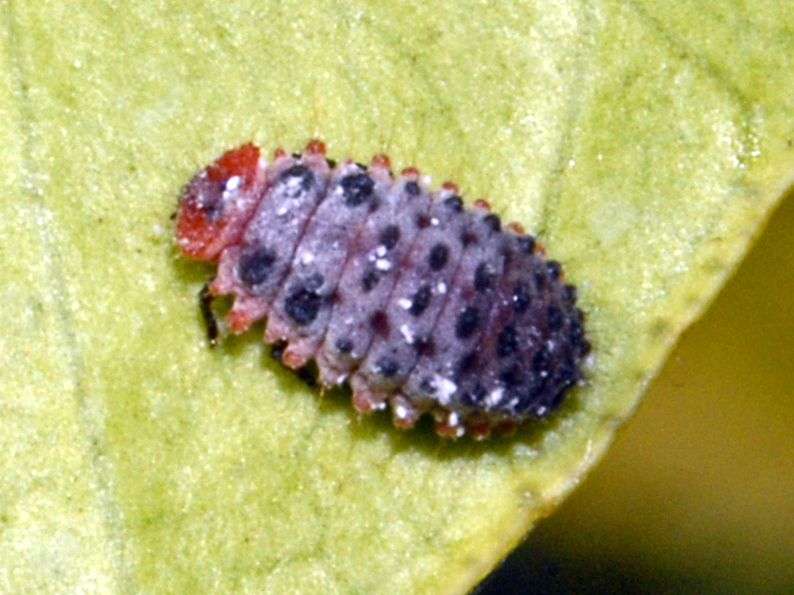
Larva

The species feeds exclusively on the cottony cushion scale, Icerya purchasi, which feeds on trees including acacia, citrus, magnolia, olive, and rose. The beetle's young larvae eat the scale insect's eggs; older larvae and adults eat all lifecycle stages of the scale insect.

== Life-cycle ==
The red eggs are laid underneath the protective scale of scale insects or directly on their egg sacs, with each female producing between 150 and 190 eggs.

First instar larvae have reddish bodies and legs. Older larvae have black tubercles on both thorax and abdomen, and black legs. There are four instars; fourth instar larvae grow to around 5 millimetres (0.2 in) in length; they attach themselves to a twig or leaf when they are ready to pupate.

The pupa is 4–5 millimetres (0.16–0.20 in) long; its case is off-white.

Breeding is rapid, with as many as 12 complete generations in a year in hot, dry regions, or about 8 generations in cooler places. However, females stop laying eggs if the temperature rises above 32 °C (90 °F).

== As a biological control agent ==
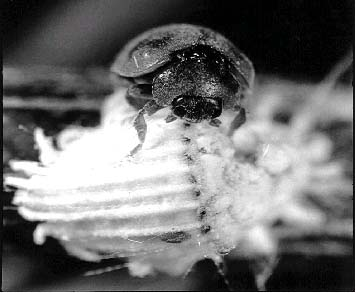
Adult feeding on Icerya purchasi

An outbreak of cottony cushion scale in California led to the importation of 514 "vedalia beetles" from Australia in 1888 as a biological control agent to protect plantations of citrus trees. The effort was successful, becoming a "spectacular" instance of biological control. This was followed by regular commercial use for that purpose.

== Distribution ==
Novius cardinalis is native to Australia and has since been introduced to citrus-growing regions of Europe and the United States.
