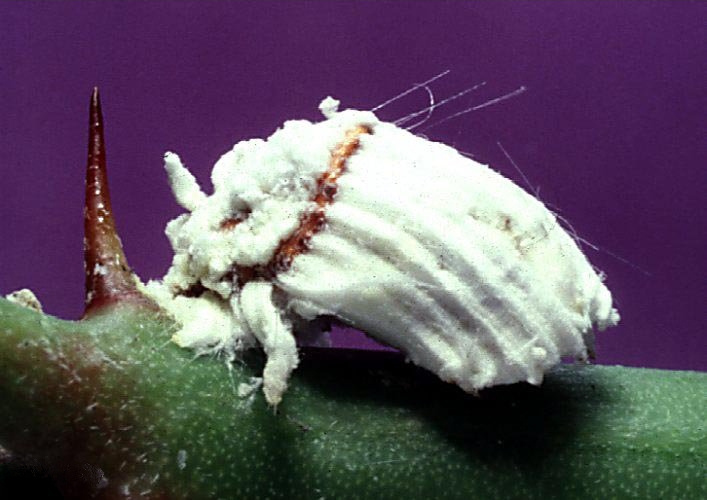
- Icerya purchasi, female

Scientific classification
- Domain: Eukaryota
- Kingdom: Animalia
- Phylum: Arthropoda
- Class: Insecta
- Order: Hemiptera
- Suborder: Sternorrhyncha
- Family: Monophlebidae
- Genus: Icerya; Signoret, 1875

Species
- See text

= Icerya =

Genus of true bugs

Icerya is a genus of scale insects in the family Monophlebidae. It is named after physician-naturalist Dr. Edmond Icery of British Mauritius.

== Hermaphroditism ==
Hermaphroditism is extremely rare in the insect world despite the comparatively common nature of this condition in the crustaceans. Several species of Icerya, including the pestiferous cottony-cushion scale, I. purchasi, are known to be hermaphrodites that reproduce by self-fertilising. Occasionally males are produced from unfertilised eggs, but generally individuals are monoecious with a female-like nature but possessing an ovotestis (a part-testis, part-ovary organ) and sperm is transmitted ovarially from the female to her young. The existence of both hermaphrodites and males in a species is known as androdioecy. This hermaphroditic sexual self-sufficiency, where a single individual can populate new territory, has contributed to the invasive spread of the cottony-cushion scale insect away from its native Australia.

== List of species ==
- Icerya aegyptiaca (Douglas 1890).
- Icerya albolutea Cockerell 1898.
- Icerya bimaculata De Lotto 1959.
- Icerya brachystegiae Hall 1940.
- Icerya brasiliensis Hempel 1920.
- Icerya callitri (Froggatt 1921).
- Icerya chilensis Hempel 1920.
- Icerya colimensis Cockerell 1902.
- Icerya flava Hempel 1920.
- Icerya flocculosa Hempel 1932.
- Icerya formicarum Newstead 1897.
- Icerya genistae Hempel 1912.
- Icerya hanoiensis Jashenko & Danzig 1992.
- Icerya imperatae Rao 1951.
- Icerya insulans Hempel 1923.
- Icerya koebelei Maskell 1892.
- Icerya leuderwaldti Hempel 1918.
- Icerya littoralis mimosae Cockerell 1902.
- Icerya littoralis tonilensis Cockerell 1902.
- Icerya littoralis Cockerell 1898.
- Icerya longisetosa Newstead 1911.
- Icerya maxima Newstead 1915.
- Icerya maynei Vayssiere 1926.
- Icerya menoni Rao 1951.
- Icerya minima Morrison 1919.
- Icerya minor Green 1908.
- Icerya montserratensis Riley & Howard 1890.
- Icerya morrisoni Rao 1951.
- Icerya nigroareolata Newstead 1917.
- Icerya palmeri Riley & Howard 1890.
- Icerya paulista Hempel 1920.
- Icerya pilosa Green 1896.
- Icerya pulchra (Leonardi 1907).
- Icerya purchasi citriperda Hempel 1920.
- Icerya purchasi crawii Cockerell 1897.
- Icerya purchasi maskelli Cockerell 1897.
- Icerya purchasi Maskell 1878 - cottony cushion scale
- Icerya rileyi Cockerell 1896.
- Icerya schoutedeni Vayssiere 1926.
- Icerya schrottkyi Hempel 1900.
- Icerya seychellarum (type) (Westwood 1855).
- Icerya seychellarum cristata Newstead 1909.
- Icerya similis Morrison 1923.
- Icerya splendida Lindinger 1913.
- Icerya subandina Leonardi 1911.
- Icerya sulfurea pattersoni Newstead 1917.
- Icerya sulfurea Lindinger 1913.
- Icerya sumatrana Rao 1951.
- Icerya taunayi Hempel 1920.
- Icerya travancorensis Rao 1951.
- Icerya tremae Vayssiere 1926.
- Icerya zeteki Cockerell 1914.
- Icerya zimmermani Green 1932.
