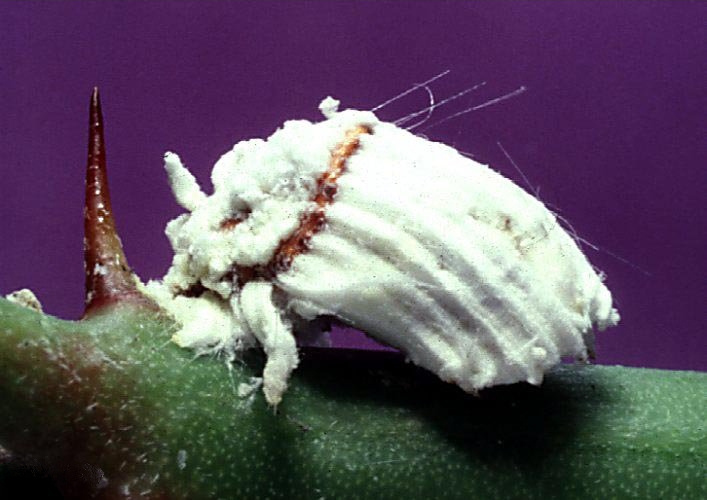
- Icerya purchasi female

Scientific classification
- Kingdom: Animalia
- Phylum: Arthropoda
- Clade: Pancrustacea
- Class: Insecta
- Order: Hemiptera
- Suborder: Sternorrhyncha
- Family: Monophlebidae
- Genus: Icerya
- Species: I. purchasi

Binomial name
- Icerya purchasi Maskell, 1878

Synonyms
- Icerya purchasi crawii Cockerell, 1897; Icerya purchasi maskelli Cockerell, 1897; Icerya purchasi citriperda Hempel, 1920

= Icerya purchasi =

Species of true bug

Icerya purchasi (common name: cottony cushion scale) is a scale insect that feeds on more than 80 families of woody plants, most notably on Citrus and Pittosporum. I. purchasi insects originated from Australia. They now exist worldwide, wherever citrus crops are grown.

The cottony cushion scale insect was originally described in 1878, from specimens collected in New Zealand as pests of kangaroo acacia; the insect was then named Icerya purchasi by W.M. Maskell, "after the Rev. Dr. Purchas who, [he] believe[d], first found it".

== Life cycle ==
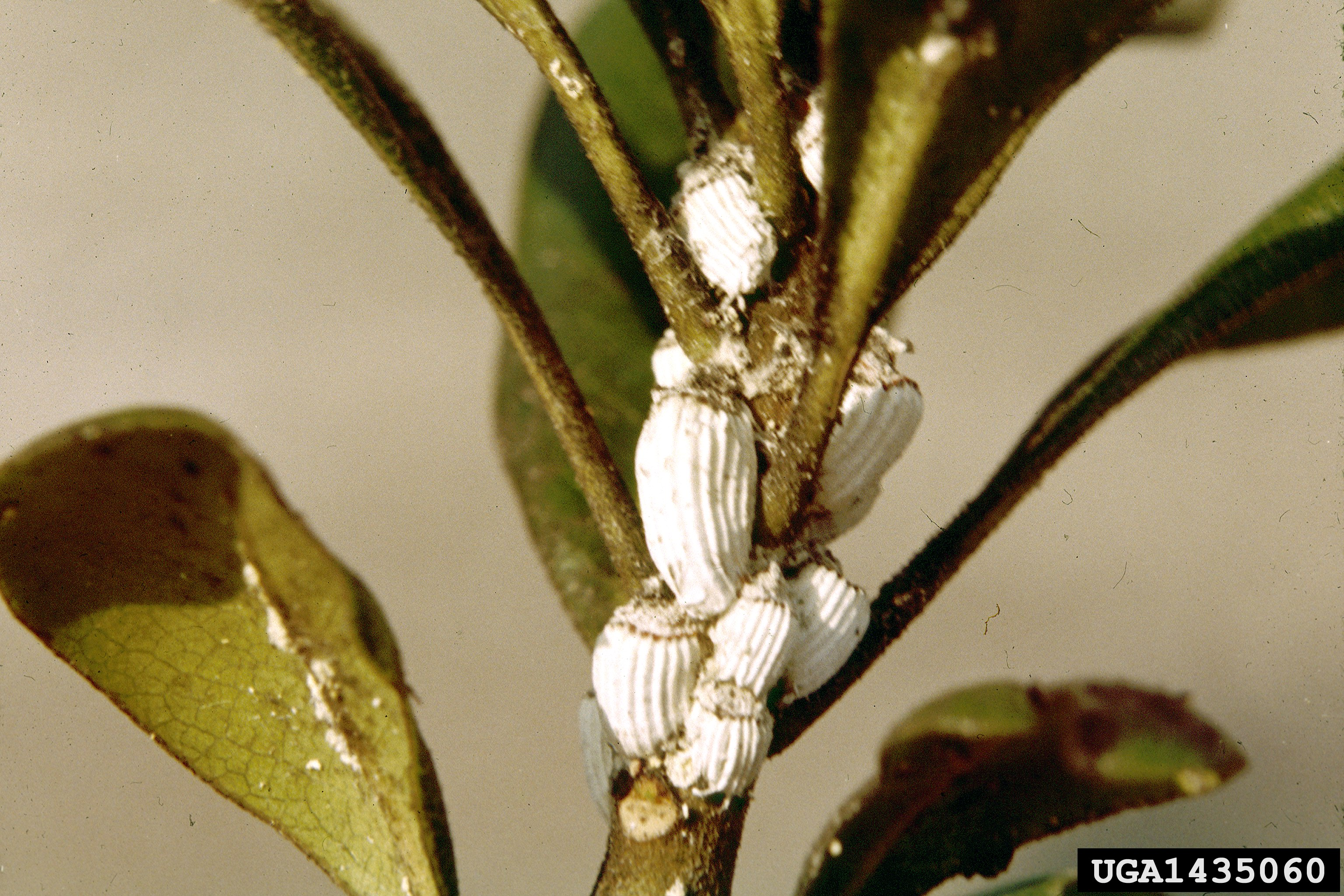
Small colony

This scale infests twigs and branches. The mature hermaphrodite is oval in shape, reddish-brown with black hairs, 5 mm long. When mature, the insect remains stationary, attaches itself to the plant by waxy secretions, and produces a white egg sac in grooves, by extrusion, in the body which encases hundreds of red eggs. The egg sac will grow to be two to three times as long as the body. Newly hatched nymphs are the primary dispersal stage, with dispersion known to occur by wind and by crawling. Early stage nymphs feed from the midrib veins of leaves and small twigs, and do the bulk of the damage. At each molt, they leave at the old feeding point the former skin and the waxy secretions in which they had covered themselves and from which their common name is derived. Unlike many other scale insects, they retain legs and a limited mobility in all life stages. Older nymphs migrate to larger twigs and eventually as adults to branches and the trunk. Their life cycle is highly temperature-dependent, as the length of time in each stage of life is longer in cold temperatures than high temperatures.

In addition to the direct damage from sap sucking, the insects also secrete honeydew, on which sooty mold often grows and causes further damage to the host plant. Some ants will also consume this honeydew.

=== Reproduction ===
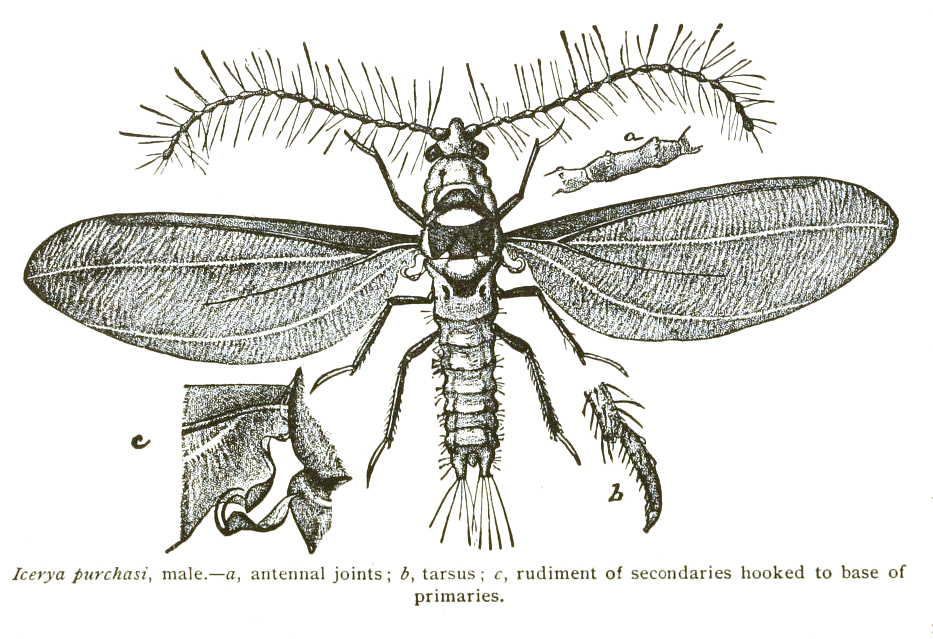
Illustration of a male

Males are rare in hermaphroditic species of Icerya. Males are haploid while females are diploid. Females have an ovitestis that is capable of producing both sperm and oocytes which fertilize internally to produce diploid offspring (females) through a form of hermaphroditism. The cells of the ovitestis are haploid and are derived from excess sperm during matings with males. This has been termed as 'parasitic tissue' and theoretical studies have examined this as a form of sexual conflict and have examined the possible fates and fitness consequences since females can produce daughters by mating with males or using their parasitic male cell lines. Females that lack ovitestes may preferentially invest in producing sons while females with parasitic tissue should prefer to pass on the genetic material through daughters.

True males are uncommon to rare overall, and in many infestations are not present. Pure females are unknown. Self-fertilization by a hermaphrodite will produce only hermaphrodites. Matings of a male and hermaphrodite will produce both males and hermaphrodites.

== Biological control ==
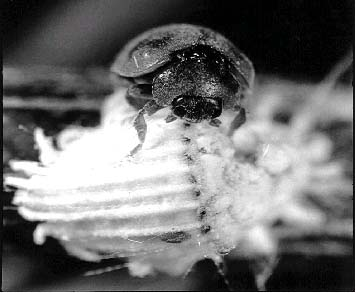
Novius cardinalis, known as the Vedalia beetle, feeding on cottony cushion scale

Icerya purchasi is important as one of the first major successes of biological control. In 1888–1889, C. V. Riley, later head of the USDA's Division of Entomology, imported the vedalia ladybird (Novius cardinalis), which rapidly reduced I. purchasi populations and saved the emerging Californian citrus industry from devastation. However, following the introduction of insecticides such as DDT and malathion in the 1950s, further outbreaks occurred due to resurgence, thought to be caused by drift from aerial spraying during the early spring months.

A second biological control, the parasitic fly Cryptochetum iceryae, has also been introduced to California as an additional control vector at around the same time.

While there is an apparent rivalry between the two natural enemies of Icerya purchasi, the competition does not affect the efficacy of the control measures when both the beetle and the fly are introduced. Biological control remains the most effective measure to manage Icerya purchasi infestations. Use of insecticides as control is recommended only if no biological control species is present. Imidacloprid is especially contraindicated, since it has no effect on this species, but is very toxic to Novius cardinalis.
