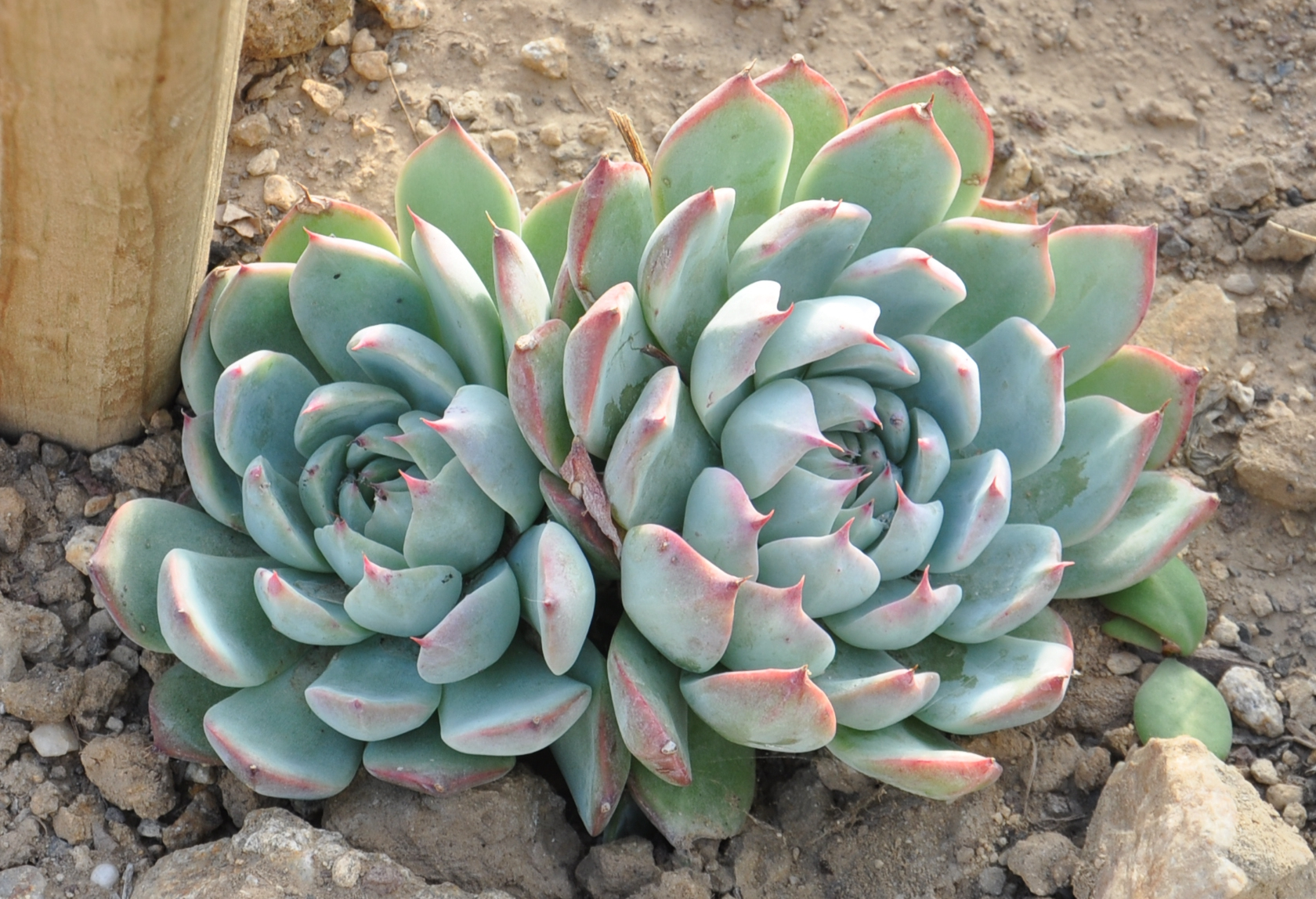

Scientific classification
- Kingdom: Plantae
- Clade: Tracheophytes
- Clade: Angiosperms
- Clade: Eudicots
- Order: Saxifragales
- Family: Crassulaceae
- Genus: Echeveria
- Species: E. chihuahuaensis

Binomial name
- Echeveria chihuahuaensis Karl von Poellnitz (1935)

= Echeveria chihuahuaensis =

Species of plant native to Mexico

Echeveria chihuahuaensis, sometimes Echeveria chihuahuensis, is a species of perennial flowering plant in the family Crassulaceae. It is native to Mexico. It is a diploid species, with a chromosome count of 50.

== Description ==
It is an evergreen succulent plant, resembling the closely related Echeveria colorata. Its leaves create a tightly formed rosette, spanning 10cm in diameter. The leaves are light-cyan coloured in the centre, with the pink sides. Leaf shape is either acuminate or mucronate. This is an easy way to distinguish it from E. colorata, in addition to E. chihuahuaensis having more dense rosettes.

The inflorescences are scorpioid cyme which carry small, yellow flowers. These stems are usually 25cm tall.

Like many other succulents that grow in intense sun, E. chihuahuaensis has a waxy coating on its leaves called the farina. This helps protect the plant from the sun. It can be rubbed off, often causing a darker color of leaf underneath. Unless severe, this normally does not affect the growth or health of the plant.

== Cultivation ==
This species has gained the Royal Horticultural Society's Award of Garden Merit.

They are able to survive temperatures as low as -3.9°C to 10°C. They should be grown in well-drained soil under full sun and not left in sitting water as this may cause the plant to rot. Dead leaves should also be removed to prevent infestation by mealy bugs.

They can be propagated by seed or stem cuttings, although it is possible to use leaf cuttings.

Despite their visual similarities, a cross between E. chihuahuaensis and E. colorata is cultivated as E. 'Beatrice'.

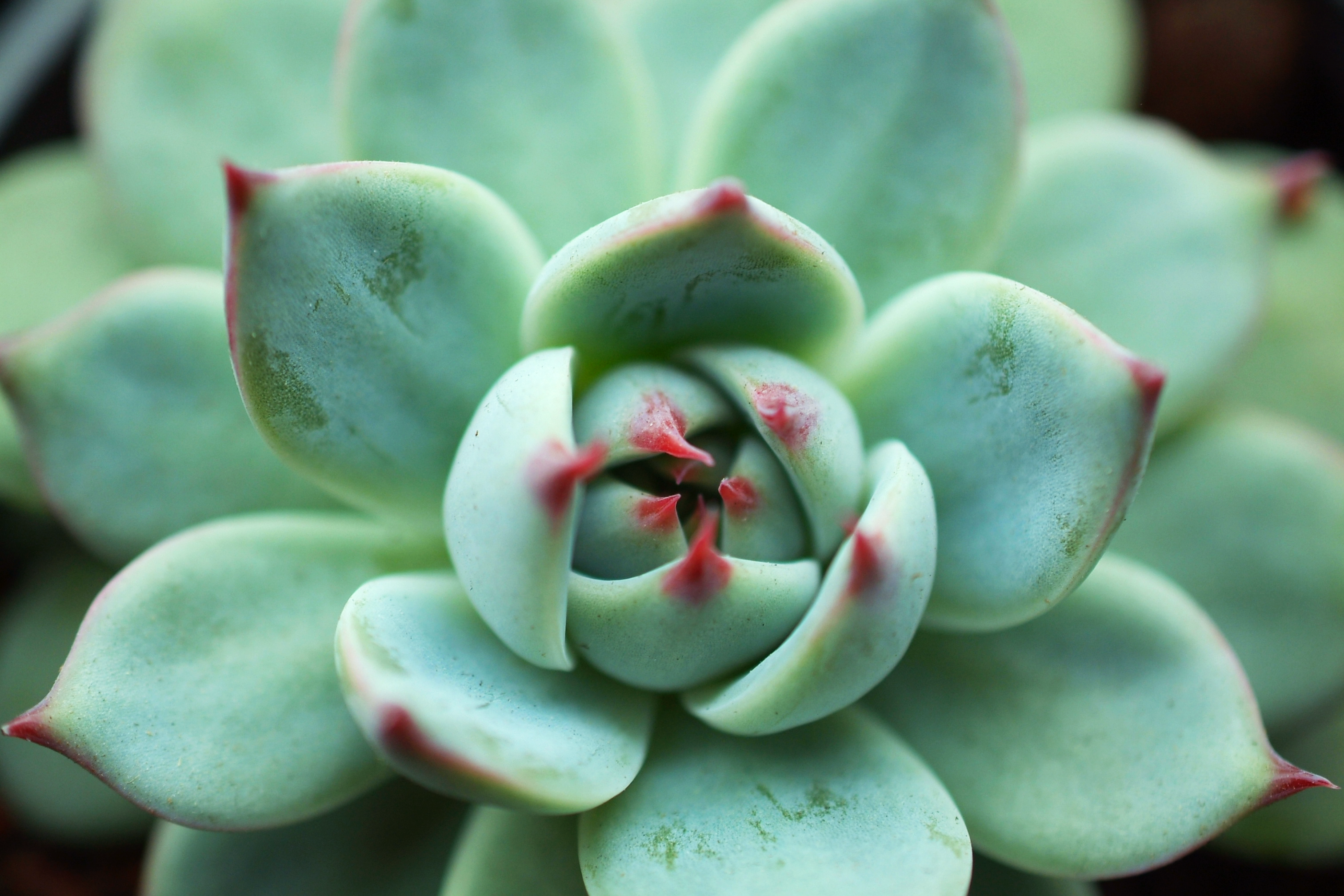
Macro photograph of an Echeveria chihuahuaensis rosette.
