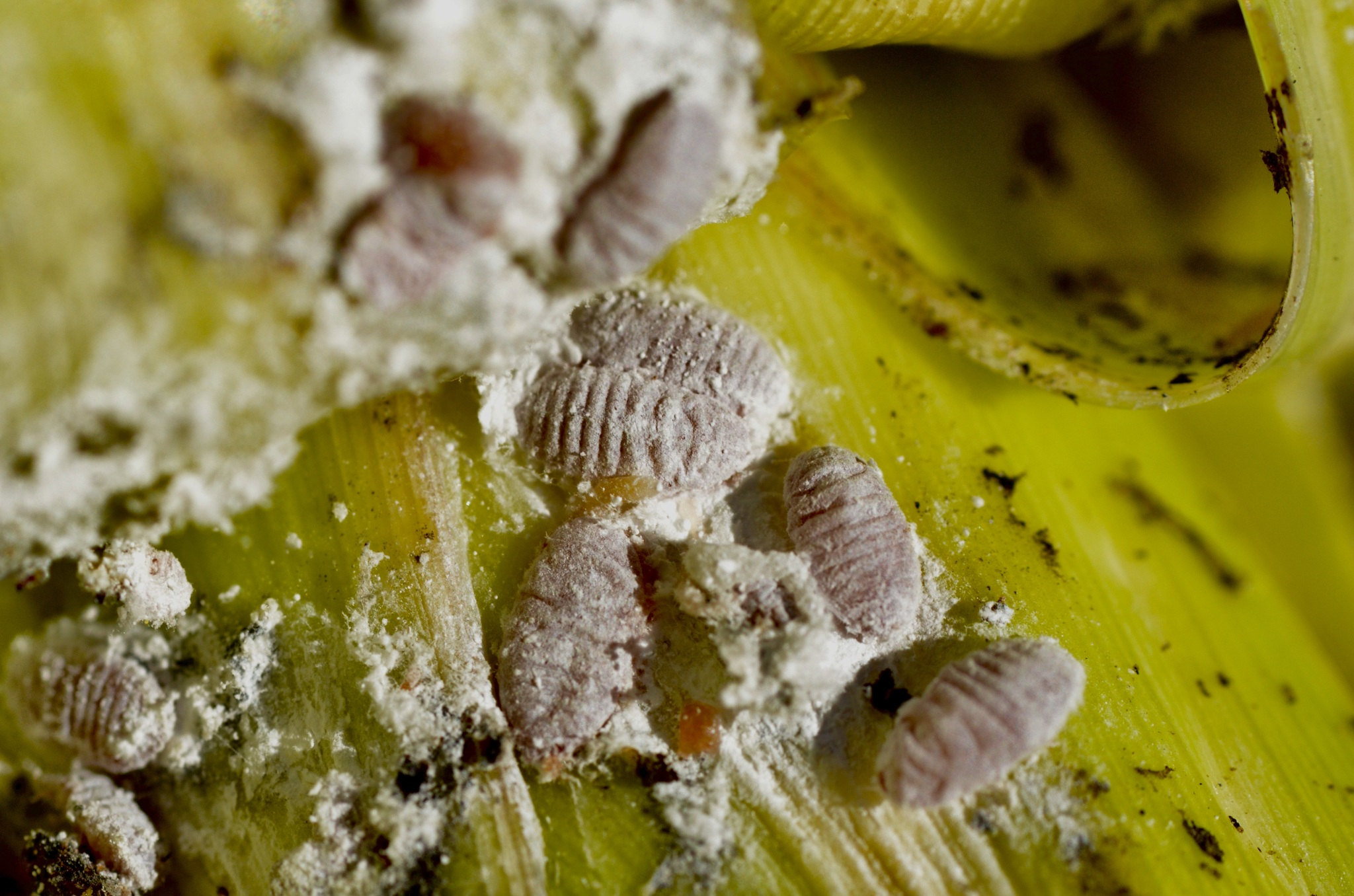

Scientific classification
- Kingdom: Animalia
- Phylum: Arthropoda
- Clade: Pancrustacea
- Class: Insecta
- Order: Hemiptera
- Suborder: Sternorrhyncha
- Family: Pseudococcidae
- Genus: Balanococcus
- Species: B. cordylinidis

Binomial name
- Balanococcus cordylinidis (Brittin, 1938)

= Balanococcus cordylinidis =

Species of true bug

Balanococcus cordylinidis, the cabbage tree mealybug, is a species of insect in the family Pseudococcidae.

== Description ==
The cabbage tree mealybug male and females look very different to each other since they are sexually dimorphic. Adult mealybug females are around 3–4 mm long and 2mm wide. Their coloring is a pinky -orange color, often this is hard to tell though because they are covered in a powdery white wax (Blog, 2018). The adult females have 3 pairs of les and with it being an oval shape there is barely any distinct division between the head and abdomen of the body. The adult Male looks completely different. The Male mealy bug is interesting because during its life cycle (will go into more detail below) it goes through a stage of being a pre-pupa and pupa which both have budding wings. When it emerges from the back of this cocoon, it has a pair of wings which harden, there is distinct division between abdomen and head. Also, it has these long wax tails thought to help with flight (Martin, 2019). In terms of what it looks similar to for reference a bit like a male ant, but this is a very vague generalization.

== Distribution ==
=== Natural global range ===
The cabbage tree mealybug is endemic to New Zealand. But other species of mealybug can be found all over the globe particularly in places with a warm moist climate. But even in places with a cold climate they can be commonly found inside or in places such as greenhouses, they can be found/live on any part of the globe (even in the Arctic or the Antarctic if there was a warm building).

=== New Zealand range ===
The cabbage tree mealybug can be found anywhere in New Zealand where there is a young cabbage tree plant. Both the North and South Island all over the Island as well. Because it is so spread a common found it is often coincided a pest by New Zealanders because it kills young cabbage tree plants which are very common in gardens and parks. Guthrie (2008) found that mealy bugs were present in all study sites around the Canterbury plains, expect Kennedy's bush.

=== Habitat preferences ===
Mealybugs have a host plant Cordyline australis (Asparagaceae). They live at the base of the leaves, usually around the debris of the previous leaves. These cabbage trees are abundant all around New Zealand, which suggests that mealybugs are also abundant around all around New Zealand

== Life cycle/phenology ==
The mealybug is sexually dimorphic which mean that the females and males have different characteristics other than sexual organs. They breed all through the year and lifespan are unknown. The female life of a cabbage tree mealybug starts as an egg being laid on the cabbage tree. Currently it is unknown exactly how long it takes for a cabbage tree mealybug to get from egg to complete maturity (Martin, 2019). The female shave three separate stages (nymphal instars) of molting skin between hatching and adult life. The females surround themselves with white wax all three times and get bigger through each stage when they are feeding the wax forms. Females lay around 300-500 eggs at a time on the underside of a Cabbage leaf. Females die shortly after eggs are laid(Irimia,2016). The males have two nymphal instars before making a fluffy white cocoon, a pre-pupa and pupa where the males do not feed at all. When it come out of the cocoon, it pushes out of the back and its wings harden and expand enabling it to fly, to help with it balance and flying it has two long wax tails. They do not feed as an adult, they are merely alive to fertilize the female.

Males fly to other colonies to mate or mate with the female from its colony. It can walk as well so could walk to other leaves on the same plant to get to another colony on the same plant, this way you get genetic variation (Martin, 2019). Because it is unknown how long they actually live for or how long from egg to adult and they breed all time thought the year it is unknown how many generation are born in a year.

== Diet and foraging ==
Both adult females and nymphs have sucking mouthparts which are shaped rods called stylets. They are held in the short sheath-like rostrum. Mealybugs will move the tip of its rostrum onto the surface of the plant leaf or steam in order to feed. The stylet is then moved into the phloem, where nutrients are transported within the plant. Mealybugs will then suck the plants sap and excrete the excess sugary liquid through their short anal tube (Martin, 2019).

== Predators, parasites, and diseases ==
Allograpta ventralis is the mealybugs specialised predator (Bowie, 2001). This predator is a hoverfly and is the only known predator to mealybugs, although lady birds (Coleoptera: Coccinellidae) are thought to have predate on mealybugs in the past. (Martin, 2019) There are no known pathogens or parasites for the cabbage tree mealybug, this may be due to the limited study on the species.

== White wax ==
Mealybugs produce an abundance of white wax which covers themselves and their surroundings. More study needs to be done to conclude exactly why mealybugs do this, but it is suggested that they do this for some kind of deterrent or warning (Martin, 2019).

== Why do mealybugs kill their host plant? ==
Because mealybugs have such few predators and their white wax is good at being a deterrent, populations of mealybugs can quickly rise. The predators can't always get to where the mealybug is, so the colonies can get so big that the juvenile cabbage trees can't handle them. (Martin, 2019)

One interesting thing about cabbage tree mealybugs is because they are commonly found they are not an endangered species in New Zealand. Although because they are commonly found they are also known to be a pest on our native trees which is interesting because they are endemic to New Zealand. They don't cause too much damage to trees but due to big colonies and over eating they do kills trees and themselves as a result.
