= List of Dysmicoccus species =

This is a list of 110 species in the genus Dysmicoccus.

== Dysmicoccus species ==
- Dysmicoccus acaciarum Williams, 1985
- Dysmicoccus aciculus Ferris, 1950
- Dysmicoccus aggeris Williams, 1985
- Dysmicoccus ambiguus (Morrison, 1925)
- Dysmicoccus amnicola Williams & Watson, 1988
- Dysmicoccus angustus (Ezzat & McConnell, 1956)
- Dysmicoccus anicus Williams, 1985
- Dysmicoccus arcanus Cox, 1987
- Dysmicoccus aurantius (Cockerell, 1901)
- Dysmicoccus badachshanicus Nurmamatov, 1978
- Dysmicoccus banksi Williams, 1985
- Dysmicoccus bispinosus Beardsley, 1965
- Dysmicoccus boninsis (Kuwana, 1909)
- Dysmicoccus brachydactylus Miller & McKenzie, 1971
- Dysmicoccus brevipes (Cockerell, 1893)
- Dysmicoccus bundooranus Williams, 1985
- Dysmicoccus busoensis Williams & Watson, 1988
- Dysmicoccus cameronensis (Takahashi, 1951)
- Dysmicoccus carens Williams, 1970
- Dysmicoccus casuarinarum Williams, 1985
- Dysmicoccus celmisicola (Cox, 1987)
- Dysmicoccus cocotis (Maskell, 1890)
- Dysmicoccus comitatus Williams & Watson, 1988
- Dysmicoccus coorongae Williams, 1985
- Dysmicoccus crassisetosus Mamet, 1962
- Dysmicoccus cucurbitae Avasthi & Shafee, 1986
- Dysmicoccus dactylus Miller & McKenzie, 1971
- Dysmicoccus darienensis Williams & Granara de Willink, 1992
- Dysmicoccus delitescens Cox, 1987
- Dysmicoccus dengwuensis Ferris, 1954
- Dysmicoccus dennoi Kosztarab, 1996
- Dysmicoccus desertorum McKenzie, 1962
- Dysmicoccus difficilis (Lobdell, 1930)
- Dysmicoccus diodium (McConnell, 1941)
- Dysmicoccus fimbriatulus (Cockerell & King in King, 1902)
- Dysmicoccus finitimus Williams, 1994
- Dysmicoccus formicicola (Maskell, 1892)
- Dysmicoccus glandularis Bazarov, 1977
- Dysmicoccus grassii (Leonardi, 1913)
- Dysmicoccus hambletoni Williams & Granara de Willink, 1992
- Dysmicoccus hilli (Froggatt, 1916)
- Dysmicoccus howrahicus Williams, 1985
- Dysmicoccus hurdi McKenzie, 1962
- Dysmicoccus hylonomus Williams & Watson, 1988
- Dysmicoccus hypogaeus Williams, 1985
- Dysmicoccus innermongolicus Tang in Tang & Li, 1988
- Dysmicoccus inquilinus (Newstead, 1920)
- Dysmicoccus insulae Williams & Watson, 1988
- Dysmicoccus jenniferae Williams, 1985
- Dysmicoccus jizani Matile-Ferrero, 1984
- Dysmicoccus joannesiae (Costa Lima, 1939)
- Dysmicoccus junceus (McConnell, 1941)
- Dysmicoccus kaiensis (Kanda, 1932)
- Dysmicoccus kazanskyi (Borchsenius, 1937)
- Dysmicoccus kozari Pellizzari & Fontana, 1996
- Dysmicoccus laporteae Williams, 1985
- Dysmicoccus lasii (Cockerell, 1896)
- Dysmicoccus lemmatus Williams, 1985
- Dysmicoccus lepidii Williams, 1985
- Dysmicoccus mackenziei Beardsley, 1965
- Dysmicoccus macrozamiae (Fuller, 1897)
- Dysmicoccus mangaianus Williams & Watson, 1988
- Dysmicoccus mcdanieli (Hollinger, 1917)
- Dysmicoccus merrilli (Ferris, 1953)
- Dysmicoccus milleri Kosztarab, 1996
- Dysmicoccus mollis De Lotto, 1961
- Dysmicoccus morrisoni (Hollinger, 1917)
- Dysmicoccus moundi Williams, 1985
- Dysmicoccus mundaringae Williams, 1985
- Dysmicoccus neobrevipes Beardsley, 1959
- Dysmicoccus nesophilus Williams & Watson, 1988
- Dysmicoccus notialis Williams, 1985
- Dysmicoccus obesus (Lobdell, 1930)
- Dysmicoccus ornatus Cox, 1987
- Dysmicoccus oryzae (Wirjati, 1959)
- Dysmicoccus papuanicus Williams & Watson, 1988
- Dysmicoccus patulae (Rau, 1938)
- Dysmicoccus pauper Danzig, 1971
- Dysmicoccus perissus Williams, 1985
- Dysmicoccus pietroi Marotta, 1992
- Dysmicoccus pinicolus McKenzie, 1964
- Dysmicoccus polymeris Miller & McKenzie, 1971
- Dysmicoccus probrevipes (Morrison, 1929)
- Dysmicoccus prochilus Williams, 1985
- Dysmicoccus queenslandianus Williams, 1985
- Dysmicoccus quercicolus (Ferris, 1918)
- Dysmicoccus racemus McKenzie, 1967
- Dysmicoccus radicis (Green, 1933)
- Dysmicoccus rapaneae Williams & Granara de Willink, 1992
- Dysmicoccus roseotinctus (Cockerell & Cockerell, 1901)
- Dysmicoccus rupestris Cox, 1987
- Dysmicoccus ryani (Coquillett, 1889)
- Dysmicoccus salmonacea (Cockerell, 1901)
- Dysmicoccus saustralis Qin & Gullan, 1990
- Dysmicoccus senegalensis Balachowsky, 1953
- Dysmicoccus shintenensis (Takahashi, 1934)
- Dysmicoccus sylvarum Williams & Granara de Willink, 1992
- Dysmicoccus texensis (Tinsley, 1900)
- Dysmicoccus tibouchinae (Hambleton, 1935)
- Dysmicoccus timberlakei (Cockerell, 1916)
- Dysmicoccus triadus Williams, 1987
- Dysmicoccus trispinosus (Hall, 1923)
- Dysmicoccus vaccinii Miller & Polavarapu, 1997
- Dysmicoccus vacuatus McKenzie, 1967
- Dysmicoccus victorianus Williams, 1985
- Dysmicoccus viticis (Green, 1929)
- Dysmicoccus walkeri (Newstead, 1891)
- Dysmicoccus waustensis Qin & Gullan, 1990
- Dysmicoccus williamsi Avasthi & Shafee, 1981
- Dysmicoccus wistariae (Green, 1923)
