= Asteliacoccus zelandigena =

Scientific classification
- Kingdom: Animalia
- Phylum: Arthropoda
- Clade: Pancrustacea
- Class: Insecta
- Order: Hemiptera
- Suborder: Sternorrhyncha
- Family: Pseudococcidae
- Genus: Asteliacoccus
- Species: A. zelandigena

Binomial name
- Asteliacoccus zelandigena Cox, 1987

Species of true bugs

Asteliacoccus zelandigena is a species of mealybug in the family Pseudococcidae, endemic to New Zealand, first described by Jennifer M. Cox in 1987. She describes it as having been found at the bases of leaves of Astelia species and on Astelia cockaynei.
