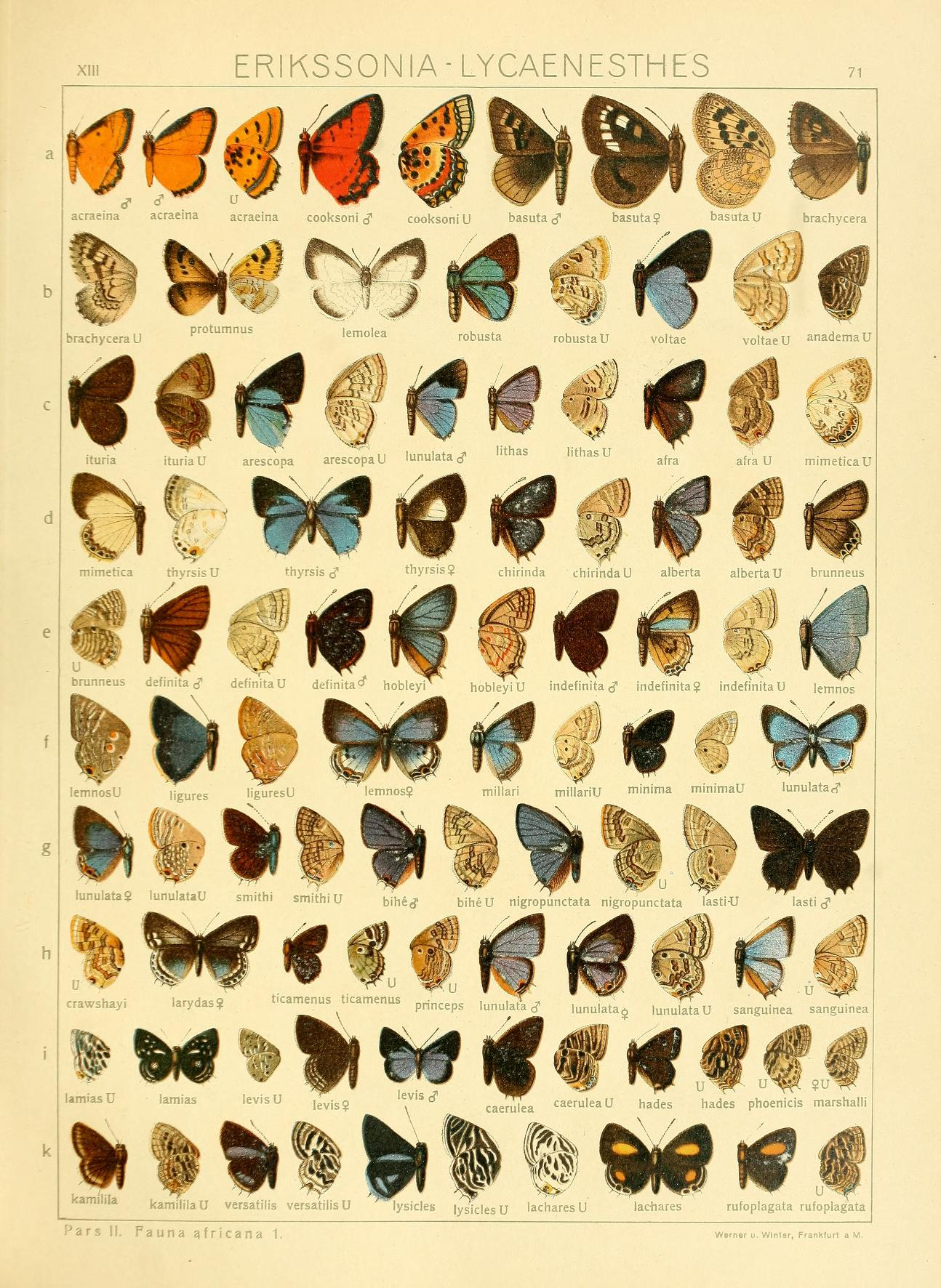

Scientific classification
- Kingdom: Animalia
- Phylum: Arthropoda
- Clade: Pancrustacea
- Class: Insecta
- Order: Lepidoptera
- Family: Lycaenidae
- Genus: Spalgis
- Species: S. lemolea

Binomial name
- Spalgis lemolea H. H. Druce, 1890

Synonyms
- Spalgis latimarginata Sharpe, 1890; Spalgis s-signata Holland, 1890

= Spalgis lemolea =

Species of butterfly

Spalgis lemolea, the lemolea harvester or African apefly, is a butterfly in the family Lycaenidae. The species was first described by Hamilton Herbert Druce in 1890. It is found in Senegal, the Gambia, Guinea-Bissau, Guinea, Liberia, Ivory Coast, Ghana, Togo, Nigeria, Cameroon, from Gabon to Ethiopia, the Democratic Republic of the Congo, Uganda, Kenya, Malawi, Zambia, northern Zimbabwe and Botswana. The habitat consists of forests and dense savannah (Guinea savannah and miombo woodland), as well as thick riverine bush. They resemble the coccids upon which they feed. These include Dactylopius (including Dactylopius longispinus, Dactylopius virgatus var. madagascariensis), Pseudococcus, Phenacoccus, Planococcoides, Ferrisiana and Planococcus species.

== Subspecies ==
- Spalgis lemolea lemolea (Senegal, the Gambia, Guinea-Bissau, Guinea, Liberia, Ivory Coast, Ghana, Togo, Nigeria, Cameroon, Gabon to Ethiopia, Democratic Republic of the Congo, Uganda, Kenya, Malawi, Zambia, northern Zimbabwe, Botswana)
- Spalgis lemolea pilos H. H. Druce, 1890 (Senegal, the Gambia, Guinea-Bissau, Guinea, Liberia, Ivory Coast, Ghana, Togo, Nigeria, Cameroon)

Torben Larsen developed a species numbering system for his 2005 publication Butterflies of West Africa. The subspecies pilos is #130. The 'Larsen' numbers have since been used with permission in A Sharp Eye on Butterflies of Ghana.
