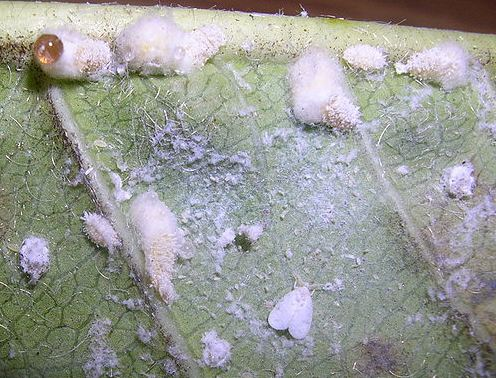
- Male and female papaya mealybugs

Scientific classification
- Domain: Eukaryota
- Kingdom: Animalia
- Phylum: Arthropoda
- Class: Insecta
- Order: Hemiptera
- Suborder: Sternorrhyncha
- Family: Pseudococcidae
- Genus: Paracoccus
- Species: P. marginatus

Binomial name
- Paracoccus marginatus Williams & Granara de Willink, 1992

= Paracoccus marginatus =

Species of true bug

Paracoccus marginatus, commonly known as the papaya mealybug, is a small sap-sucking insect in the mealybug family, Pseudococcidae. It is found on a number of different hosts, including economically important tropical fruit trees and various ornamental plants.

== Description ==
The adult female has a yellowish segmented, flattened oval body about two millimetres long covered with mealy wax. There are a number of short waxy filaments projecting around the margin. The ovisac is well developed and visible underneath the posterior part of the body. Sometimes the wax looks like cotton wool and oozes drops of fluid. The adult male is pinkish and about one millimetre long, with well-developed wings each marked with a small basal vein. The antennae have eight segments in both sexes, a characteristic which distinguishes this species from the hibiscus mealybug (Maconellicoccus hirsutus).

== Distribution ==
This species is believed to be native to Belize, Costa Rica, Guatemala and Mexico. It has spread to certain Caribbean Islands, Hawaii and French Guiana, and also to parts of Southeast Asia, including India, Indonesia and Thailand. It was discovered in Bradenton, Florida, in the United States in 1998 feeding on hibiscus, and four years later it had been detected on eighteen different plant species in the state. It has since been found in Texas and California and it is likely to become more widely distributed on the Gulf Coast, and perhaps also in crops grown under glass further north in the United States. The introduction of this species has caused damage to papaya cultivation in South India, especially in the states of Karnataka, Kerala and Tamil Nadu. It has also invaded Assam - a northeastern state of India. It was recently noted in Réunion in the Indian Ocean.

== Host plants ==
The papaya mealybug feeds on over 55 plants in more than 25 genera. Economically important host plants include papaya, avocado, citrus, mango, cherry and pomegranate, as well as hibiscus, cotton, tomato, eggplant, peppers, beans, peas and sweet potato. The mango is more affected by the mango mealybug.

== Biology ==
The adult female deposits up to six hundred eggs into her ovisac over a period of one to two weeks. The eggs hatch ten days later and the crawlers, which resemble miniature versions of the adult female, disperse. There are four instars in the females and five in the males. The fifth instar male is a pupa in which the nymph undergoes metamorphosis into a winged adult.

== Damage ==
The papaya mealybug inserts its stylet into the epidermis of the leaf or the skin of fruit or stem and feeds on the plant sap. At the same time it injects a toxic substance into the plant which results in chlorosis, distortion, stunting, early leaf and fruit fall, the production of honeydew, sooty mould and possibly the death of the plant.

== Biological control ==
Natural enemies of the papaya mealybug include the mealybug destroyer (Cryptolaemus montrouzieri), other lady beetles, lacewings and hoverflies. The larvae of several species of parasitoid wasp in the family Encyrtidae attack the papaya mealybug in its native range.

In 1999, the USDA Animal and Plant Health Inspection Service and Agricultural Research Service collected and reared four species of wasp from Mexico in a biological pest control experiment. They introduced them into Puerto Rico and the Dominican Republic and achieved a reduction of the papaya mealybug populations in both countries of over 95%. All four wasps were observed parasitising second and third instars of the papaya mealybug, and Acerophagus papayae was the dominant species. All four have since been mass-reared and released in Florida.
