= Pelionella =

Scientific classification
- Kingdom: Animalia
- Phylum: Arthropoda
- Class: Insecta
- Order: Hemiptera
- Suborder: Sternorrhyncha
- Family: Pseudococcidae
- Genus: Pelionella; Kaydan, 2015

Type species
- Peliococcus manifectus Borchsenius, 1949

Diversity
- 12 species

Synonyms
- Pelionella Danzig & Gavrilov-Zimin, 2014

Genus of true bugs

Pelionella, is a genus of mealybugs belonging to the family Pseudococcidae. The genus contains 12 species.

== Species ==
- Pelionella balteata (Green, 1928)
- Pelionella cycliger (Leonardi, 1908)
- Pelionella glandulifer (Borchsenius, 1949)
- Pelionella grassiana (Goux, 1989)
- Pelionella kansui Kaydan, 2015
- Pelionella manifecta (Borchsenius, 1949)
- Pelionella multipora Kaydan, 2015
- Pelionella osakaensis Tanaka, 2018
- Pelionella proeminens (Goux, 1989)
- Pelionella sablia (Goux, 1989)
- Pelionella stellarocheae (Goux, 1990)
- Pelionella tritubulata (Kiritchenko, 1940)
