= P. marginatus =

P. marginatus may refer to:

- Paracoccus marginatus, the papaya mealybug
- Phlebopus marginatus, the Salmon gum mushroom
