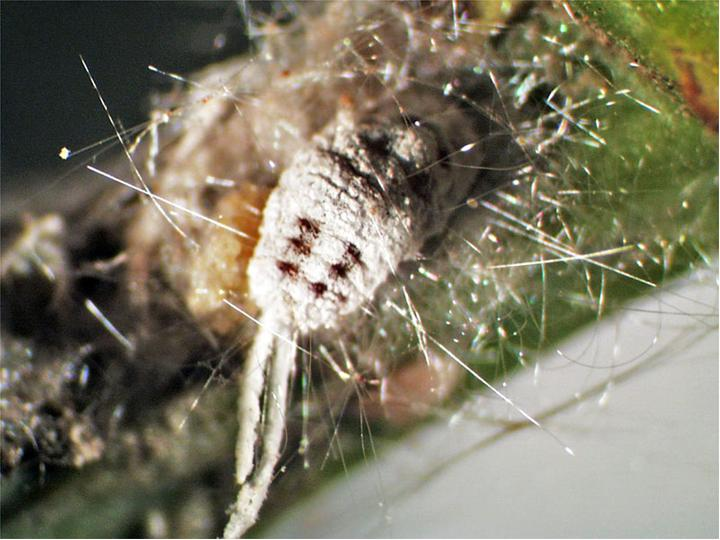
- An adult Ferrisia virgata with eggs

Scientific classification
- Kingdom: Animalia
- Phylum: Arthropoda
- Clade: Pancrustacea
- Class: Insecta
- Order: Hemiptera
- Suborder: Sternorrhyncha
- Family: Pseudococcidae
- Genus: Ferrisia
- Species: F. virgata

Binomial name
- Ferrisia virgata (Cockerell, 1893)

= Ferrisia virgata =

Species of true bug

Ferrisia virgata, commonly known as the striped mealybug, is a species of mealybug belonging to the Pseudococcidae family. F. virgata parasitizes different crops including cottonplants. Female species are between the 4 and 4.5 millimetres (5/32 and 23/128 in) long. The species was discovered and described by Theodore Dru Alison Cockerell in 1893.

== Images ==
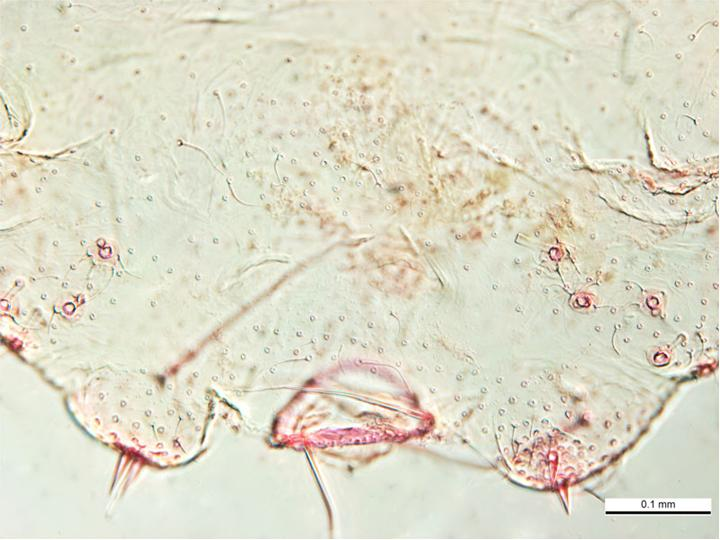
Ferrisia virgata duct

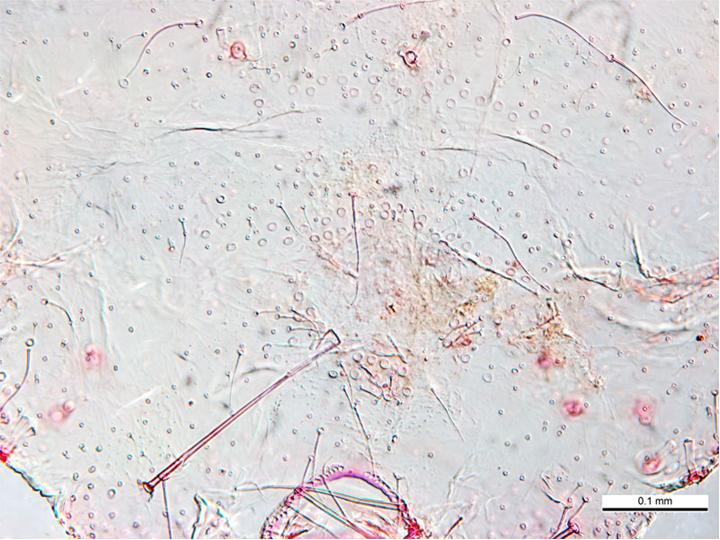
Ferrisia virgata gonopore

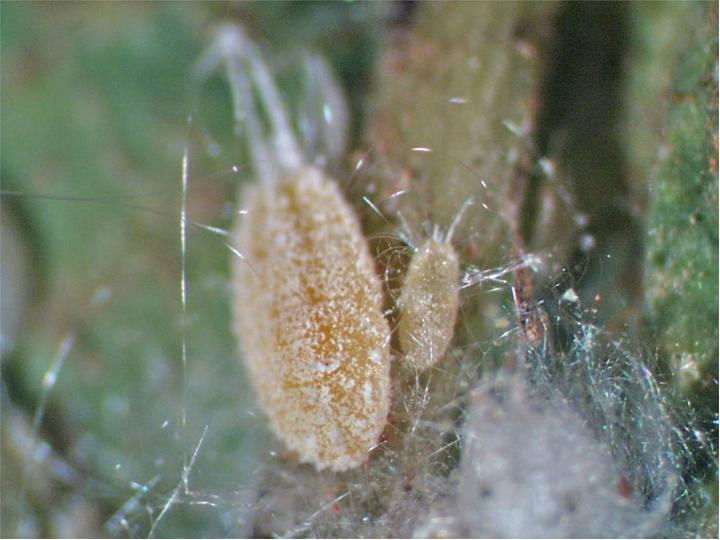
Ferrisia virgata first and second instar
