= Novius breviuscula =

Scientific classification
- Kingdom: Animalia
- Phylum: Arthropoda
- Clade: Pancrustacea
- Class: Insecta
- Order: Coleoptera
- Suborder: Polyphaga
- Infraorder: Cucujiformia
- Family: Coccinellidae
- Genus: Novius
- Species: N. breviuscula

Binomial name
- Novius breviuscula (Weise, 1892)

Synonyms
- Rodolia breviuscula Weise, 1892

Species of beetle

Novius breviuscula is a species of lady beetle native to India, Sri Lanka and Myanmar.

== Description ==
Body length is about 3.25 to 5.5 mm.

== Biology ==
It is a predator of Maconellicoccus hirsutus.
