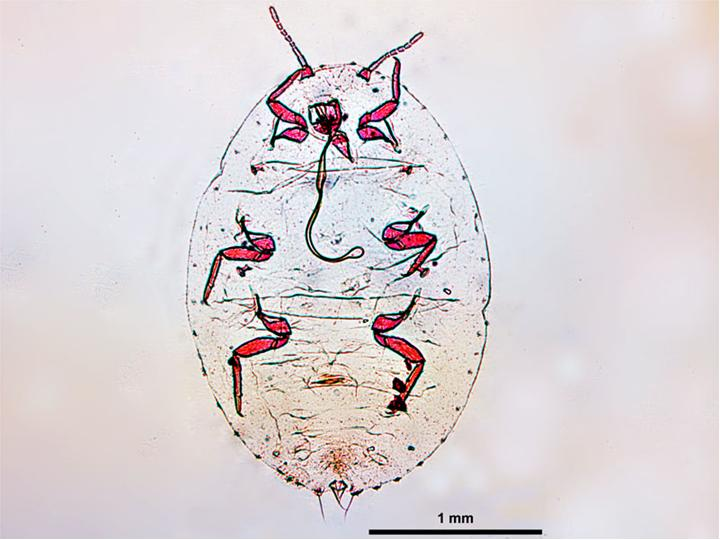

Scientific classification
- Kingdom: Animalia
- Phylum: Arthropoda
- Clade: Pancrustacea
- Class: Insecta
- Order: Hemiptera
- Suborder: Sternorrhyncha
- Family: Pseudococcidae
- Genus: Dysmicoccus
- Species: D. brevipes

Binomial name
- Dysmicoccus brevipes Cockerell, 1893

= Dysmicoccus brevipes =

Species of true bug

Dysmicoccus brevipes is a mealybug. The scientific name was published for the first time by Theodore Dru Alison Cockerell in 1893. The species is found primarily on pineapple and other species in the genus Ananas, but also infests citrus trees, cotton, banana, coffee and other plants.

== Characteristics ==
The adult Dysmicoccus brevipes has a pink to pink-orange coloured body. The body's shape varies from round till oval and is between 2.3 and 3.0 millimetres long. There are seventeen pairs of wax-producing glands which produce short wax filaments which conceal the body. The larvae are flattened and have long hairs.

== Ecology ==
The species is ovoviviparous, and the female gives birth to live young, typically two or three hundred, after which she dies. The first stage larvae are known as "crawlers" and disperse, sometimes being conveyed by the wind to new host plants. The larval stage is variable but lasts for about five weeks. The only larval stages that feed are the first and the beginning of the second instar stage. After the third moult, the larva becomes mature, and the total lifespan averages 95 days.

== Distribution ==
Dysmicoccus brevipes can be found in a wide variety of regions. It has been found in Hawaii, the Pacific, Central and South America, Australia and Africa.
