= Clavicoccus erinaceus =

Conservation status
- Extinct (IUCN 2.3)

Scientific classification
- Kingdom: Animalia
- Phylum: Arthropoda
- Class: Insecta
- Order: Hemiptera
- Suborder: Sternorrhyncha
- Family: Pseudococcidae
- Genus: Clavicoccus
- Species: †C. erinaceus

Binomial name
- †Clavicoccus erinaceus Ferris, 1948

Extinct species of true bug

Clavicoccus erinaceus is an extinct species of mealybug in the family Pseudococcidae. It was endemic to Oʻahu, where it lived on its host plant, the now critically endangered greenflower Indian mallow, Abutilon sandwicense.
