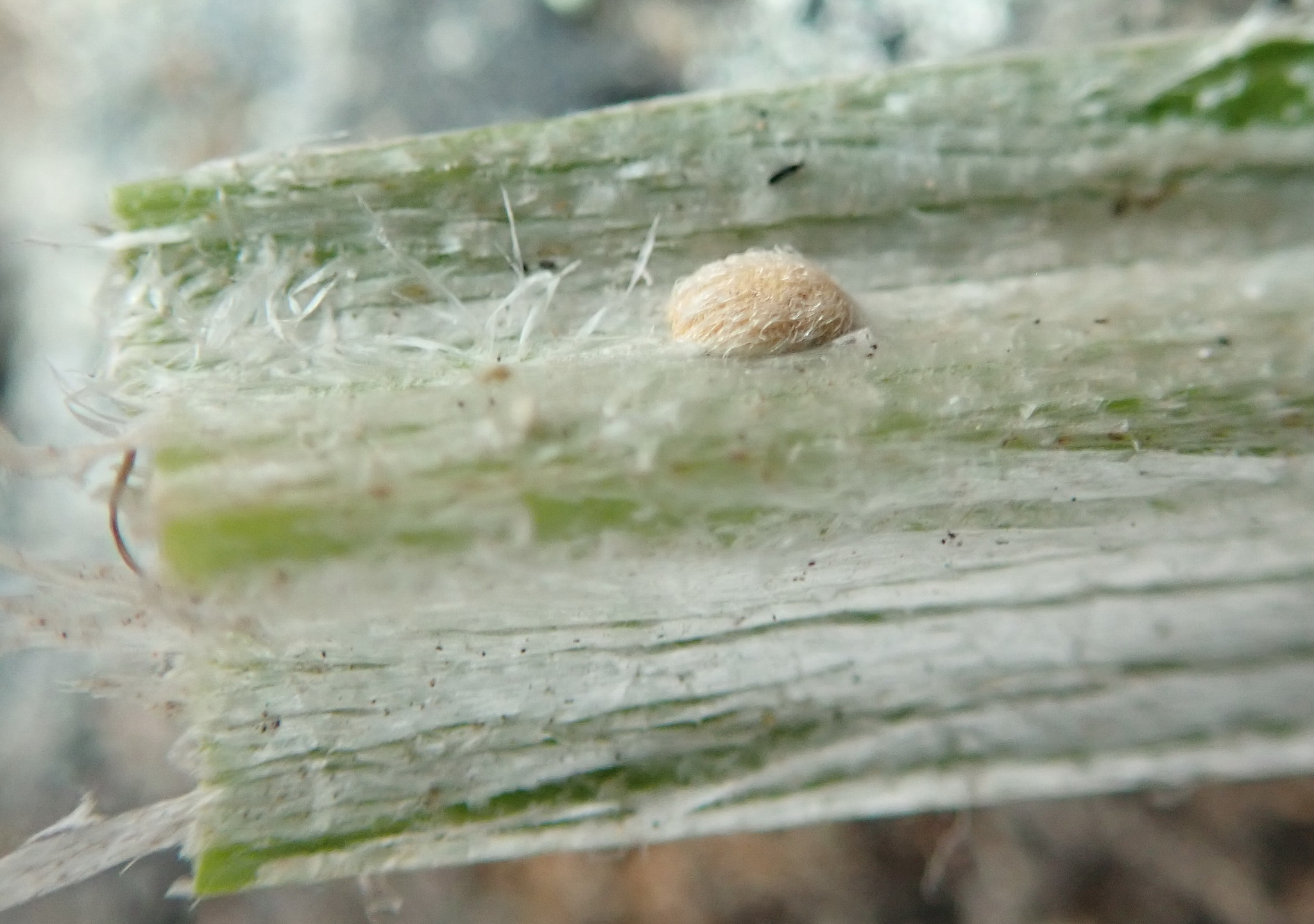
- A. margaretae

Scientific classification
- Kingdom: Animalia
- Phylum: Arthropoda
- Clade: Pancrustacea
- Class: Insecta
- Order: Hemiptera
- Suborder: Sternorrhyncha
- Family: Pseudococcidae
- Genus: Asteliacoccus
- Species: A. margaretae

Binomial name
- Asteliacoccus margaretae Williams, 1985

= Asteliacoccus margaretae =

Species of true bugs

Asteliacoccus margaretae is a species of mealybug in the family Pseudococcidae, first described by Douglas John Williams in 1985, which is endemic to Tasmania. The species epithet, margaretae, honours the Australian entomologist, Margaret A. Williams, who collected the type specimen at Collin's Bonnet in Tasmania, where it was found on the host plant, Astelia alpina.

== Gallery ==
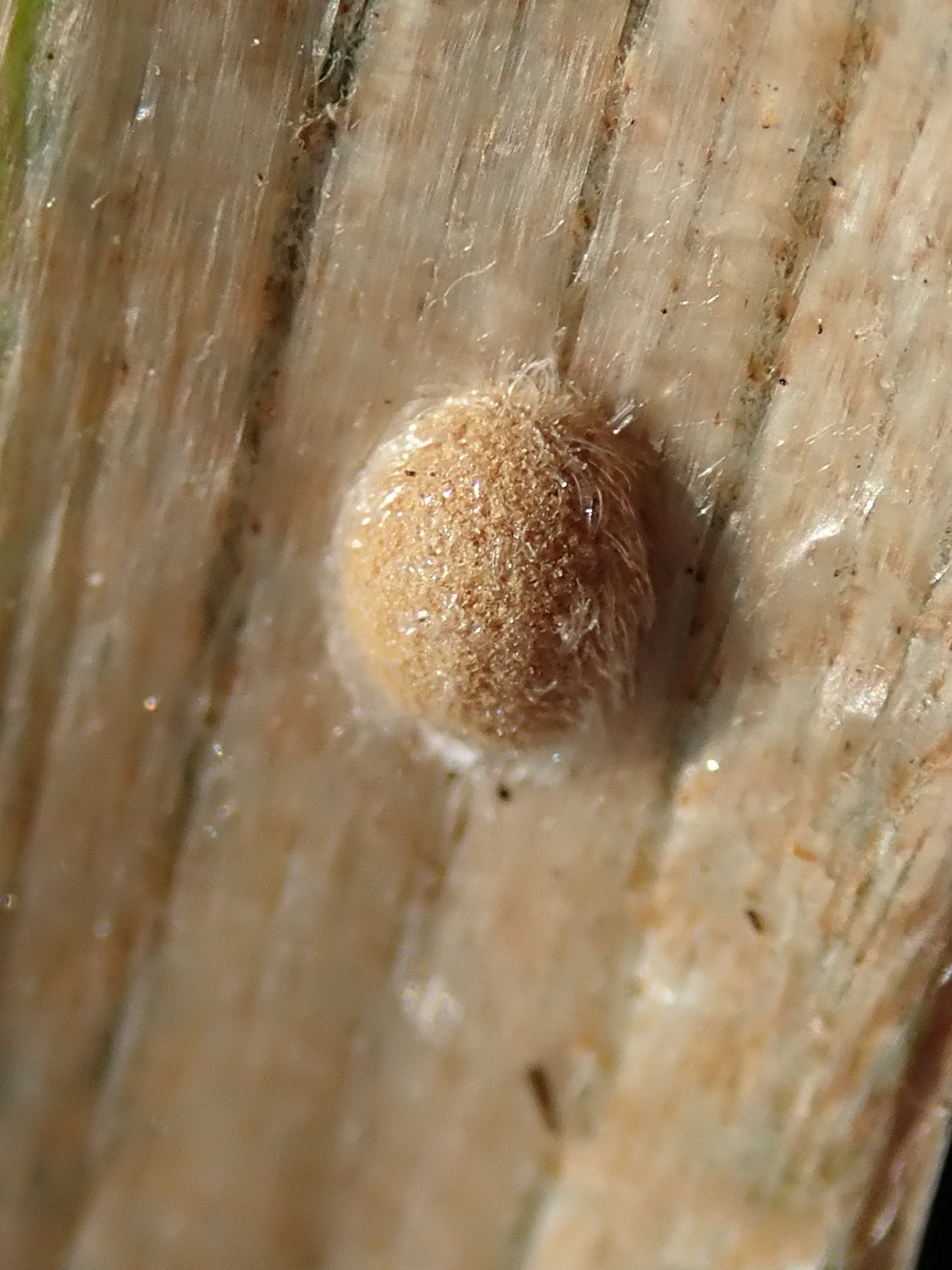
adult female - dorsal view

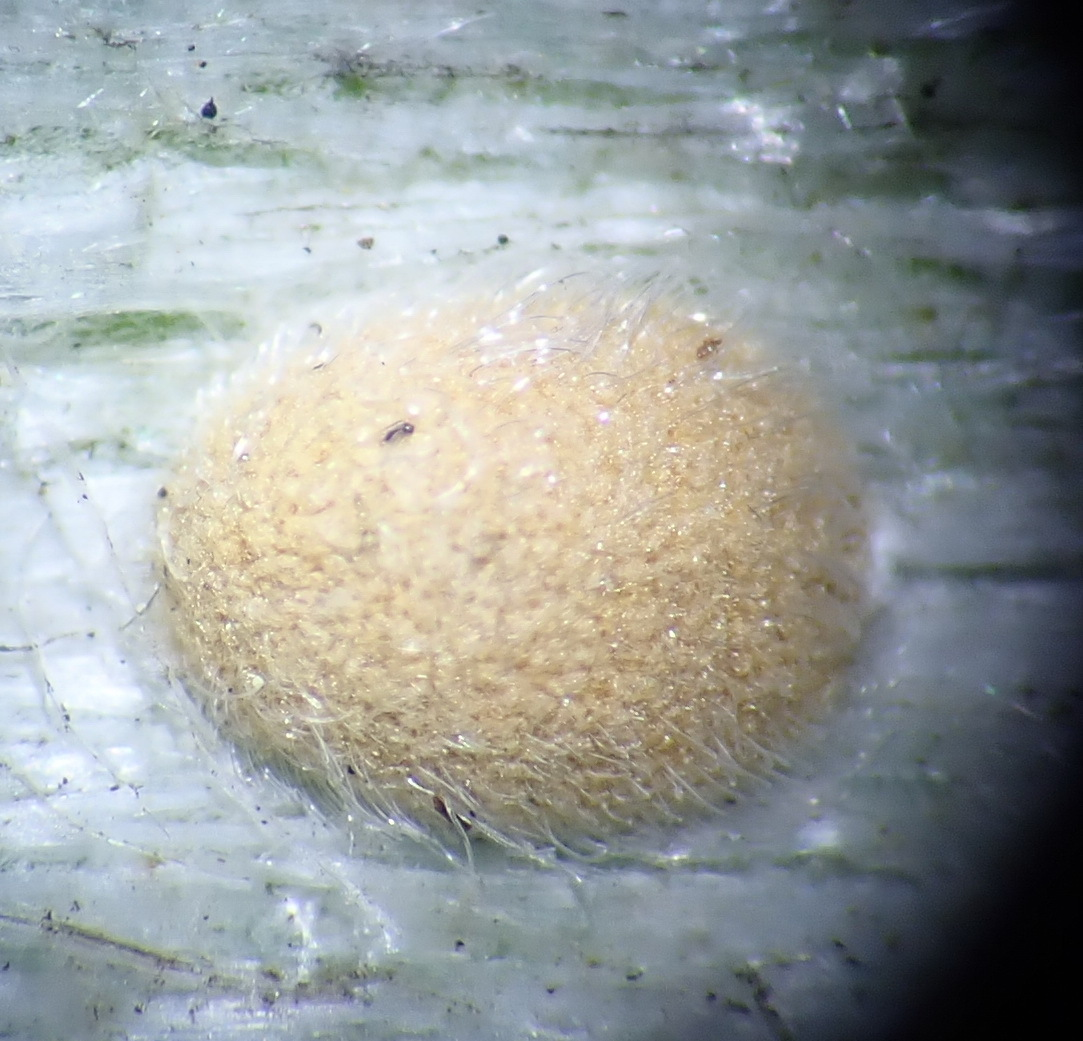
adult female - dorsal view

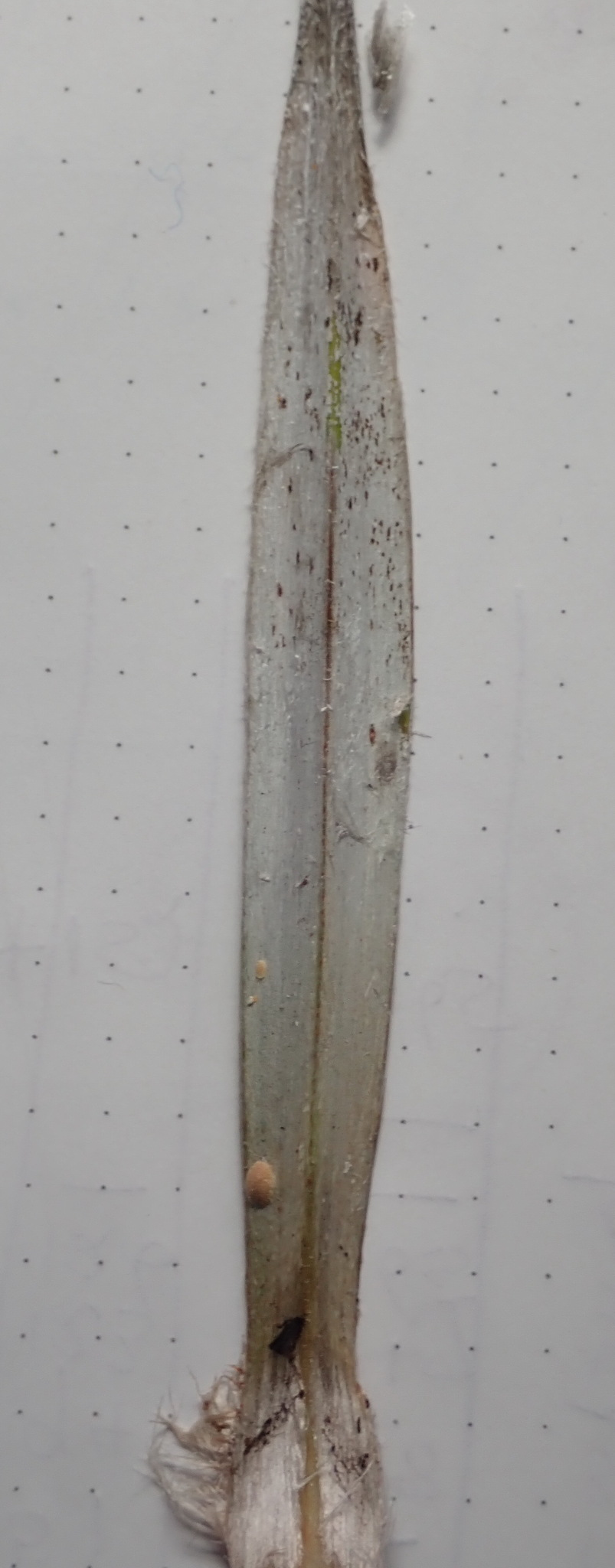
adult female on the underside of the leaf base

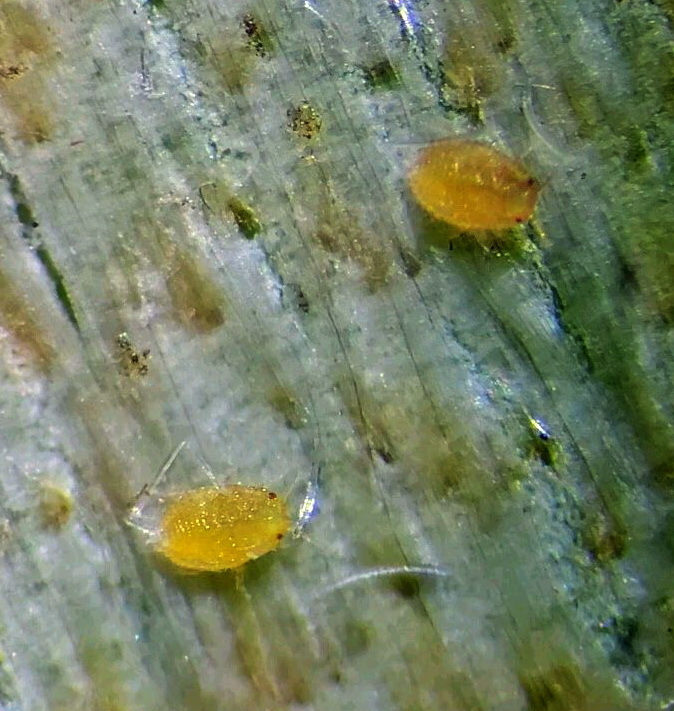
first instar

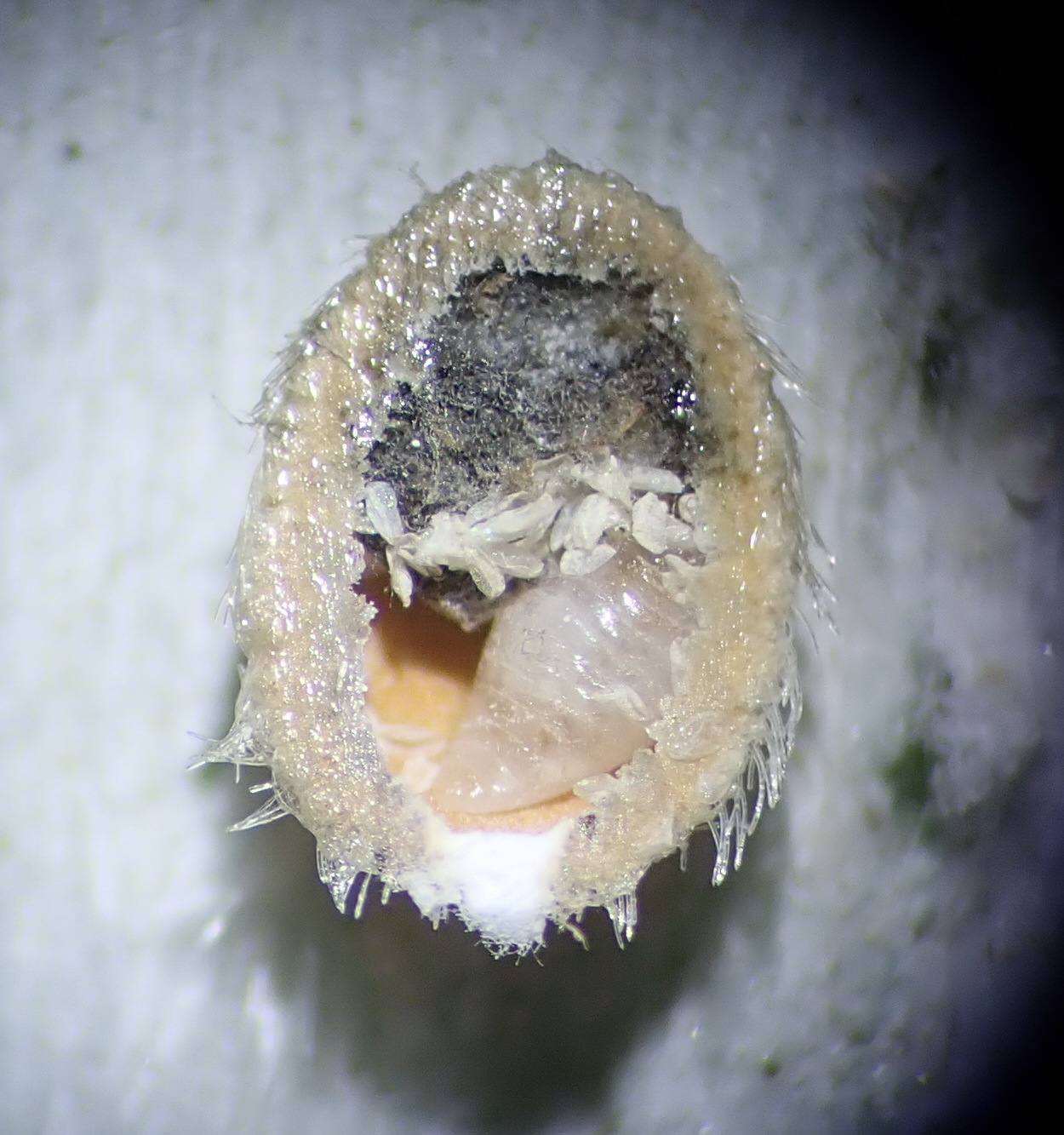
adult ventral view, showing white parasite larva
