= Paracoccus =

Paracoccus is the scientific name of two genera of organisms and may refer to:

- Paracoccus (bacterium), a genus of bacteria in the family Rhodobacteraceae
- Paracoccus (bug), a genus of insects in the family Pseudococcidae
