= Heliococcus summervillei =

Scientific classification
- Kingdom: Animalia
- Phylum: Arthropoda
- Clade: Pancrustacea
- Class: Insecta
- Order: Hemiptera
- Suborder: Sternorrhyncha
- Family: Pseudococcidae
- Genus: Heliococcus
- Species: H. summervillei

Binomial name
- Heliococcus summervillei Brookes, 1978

Synonyms
- Novonilacoccus oryzae Ghosh & Ghose, 1987

Species of insect

Heliococcus summervillei, the pasture mealybug, is a species of true bug in the family Pseudococcidae, the mealy bugs, subfamily Phenacoccinae. It was originally collected in Pakistan and Australia, and has been spreading worldwide. A sap-feeder, it attacks many pasture grass species, rice, and sugarcane, causing severe damage depending on local conditions.
