= Heliococcus =

Scientific classification
- Kingdom: Animalia
- Phylum: Arthropoda
- Clade: Pancrustacea
- Class: Insecta
- Order: Hemiptera
- Suborder: Sternorrhyncha
- Family: Pseudococcidae
- Subfamily: Phenacoccinae
- Genus: Heliococcus; Šulc, 1912

Synonyms
- Saliococcus Kanda, 1934; Takahashicoccus Kanda, 1959; Novonilacoccus Ghosh & Ghose, 1987; Heteroheliococcus Wu & Tang, 1997

Genus of true bugs

Heliococcus is a genus of true bugs in the family Pseudococcidae, the mealy bugs, subfamily Phenacoccinae. The type species is Heliococcus bohemicus.

== Species ==
Species include:

- Heliococcus acirculus
- Heliococcus adenostomae
- Heliococcus ardisiae
- Heliococcus astragali
- Heliococcus atraphaxidis
- Heliococcus atriplicis
- Heliococcus bambusae
- Heliococcus baotoui
- Heliococcus bohemicus
- Heliococcus brincki
- Heliococcus buteae
- Heliococcus chodzhenticus
- Heliococcus clemente
- Heliococcus corralesi
- Heliococcus deserticola
- Heliococcus destructor
- Heliococcus dissimilis
- Heliococcus dorsiporosus
- Heliococcus etubularis
- Heliococcus glacialis
- Heliococcus glycinicola
- Heliococcus halocnemi
- Heliococcus herbaceus
- Heliococcus hissaricus
- Heliococcus insignis
- Heliococcus kurilensis
- Heliococcus lingnaniae
- Heliococcus lishanensis
- Heliococcus maritimus
- Heliococcus medvedevi
- Heliococcus minutus
- Heliococcus mirabilis
- Heliococcus montanus
- Heliococcus myopori
- Heliococcus nivearum
- Heliococcus oligadenatus
- Heliococcus osborni
- Heliococcus pamirensis
- Heliococcus pavlovskii
- Heliococcus phaseoli
- Heliococcus quadriglandularis
- Heliococcus radicicola
- Heliococcus salviae
- Heliococcus schmelevi
- Heliococcus scutellariae
- Heliococcus singularis
- Heliococcus stachyos
- Heliococcus sulcii
- Heliococcus summervillei
- Heliococcus szetshuanensis
- Heliococcus takae
- Heliococcus takahashii
- Heliococcus tinglei
- Heliococcus tokyoensis
- Heliococcus varioporus
- Heliococcus wheeleri
- Heliococcus zoysiae
