= Rhizoecus =

Scientific classification
- Kingdom: Animalia
- Phylum: Arthropoda
- Class: Insecta
- Order: Hemiptera
- Suborder: Sternorrhyncha
- Family: Pseudococcidae
- Genus: Rhizoecus; Künckel d'Herculais, 1878

Genus of insects

Rhizoecus is a genus of true bugs belonging to the family Pseudococcidae.

The genus has almost cosmopolitan distribution.

Species:

- Rhizoecus advenoides Takagi & Kawai, 1971
- Rhizoecus albidus Goux, 1942
