= Giraudia =

Giraudia may refer to:

- Giraudia (wasp), a genus of ichneumon wasps in the family Ichneumonidae
- Giraudia (alga), a genus of brown algae
- Giraudia Bourguignat, 1885 – a synonym of Bridouxia, a genus of freshwater snails in the family Paludomidae
- Giraudia Goux, 1989 – name replaced by Gouxia Goçak & Kemal, 2009, a genus of a mealybugs in the family Pseudococcidae
