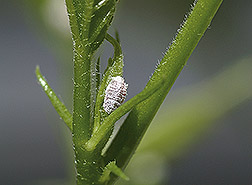

Scientific classification
- Domain: Eukaryota
- Kingdom: Animalia
- Phylum: Arthropoda
- Class: Insecta
- Order: Hemiptera
- Suborder: Sternorrhyncha
- Family: Pseudococcidae
- Genus: Maconellicoccus; Ezzat, 1958

= Maconellicoccus =

Genus of insects

Maconellicoccus is a genus of true bugs belonging to the family Pseudococcidae.

The species of this genus are found in tropical regions and Australia.

== Species ==
Species:

- Maconellicoccus australiensis (Green & Lidgett, 1900)
- Maconellicoccus hirstutus
- Maconellicoccus hirsutus (Green, 1908)
- Maconellicoccus lanigerus (Fuller, 1897)
- Maconellicoccus leptospermi Williams, 1985
- Maconellicoccus multipori (Takahashi, 1951)
- Maconellicoccus ramchensis Williams, 1996
- Maconellicoccus tasmaniae Williams, 1985
- Maconellicoccus ugandae (Laing, 1925)
