= Spilococcus =

Scientific classification
- Kingdom: Animalia
- Phylum: Arthropoda
- Class: Insecta
- Order: Hemiptera
- Suborder: Sternorrhyncha
- Family: Pseudococcidae
- Genus: Spilococcus; Ferris, 1950

Genus of true bugs

Spilococcus is a genus of true bugs belonging to the family Pseudococcidae.

The genus has almost cosmopolitan distribution.

Species:

- Spilococcus alhagii (Hall, 1926)
- Spilococcus andersoni (Coleman, 1903)
