= Clavicoccus =

Scientific classification
- Domain: Eukaryota
- Kingdom: Animalia
- Phylum: Arthropoda
- Class: Insecta
- Order: Hemiptera
- Suborder: Sternorrhyncha
- Family: Pseudococcidae
- Genus: Clavicoccus; Ferris, 1948

Genus of true bugs

Clavicoccus is a genus of insect in the family Pseudococcidae. It contains the following species:

- Clavicoccus erinaceus Ferris, 1948
- Clavicoccus tribulus Ferris, 1948
