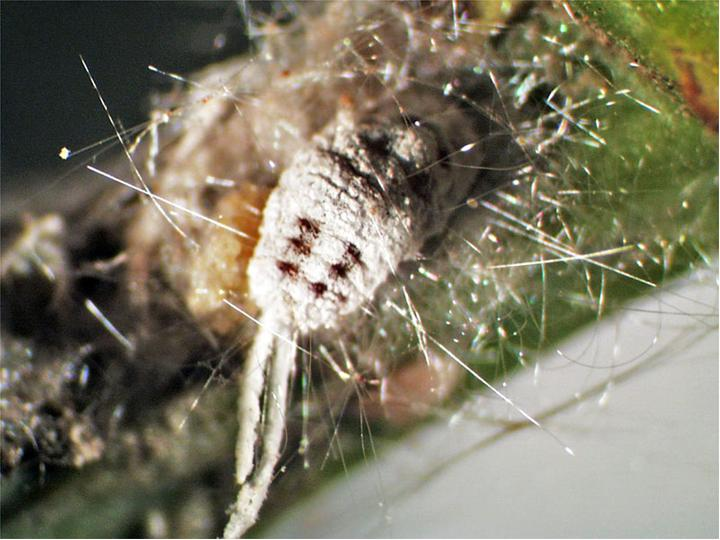
- Ferrisia virgata adult and eggs

Scientific classification
- Kingdom: Animalia
- Phylum: Arthropoda
- Clade: Pancrustacea
- Class: Insecta
- Order: Hemiptera
- Suborder: Sternorrhyncha
- Family: Pseudococcidae
- Genus: Ferrisia; Fullaway, 1923

Type species
- Dactylopius virgatus Cockerell, 1893

Synonyms
- Ferrisiana Takahashi, 1929

= Ferrisia =

Genus of mealybugs

Ferrisia is a genus of mealybugs.

== Description ==
Ferrisia adult females have long glassy filaments and (in most species) dark areas of cuticle. When slide-mounted (a typical process for identifying mealybugs), Ferrisia have enlarged dorsal tubular ducts which are used to secrete the glassy filaments. These ducts have a robust opening surrounded by an irregularly circular sclerotised area, and in this area are one or more setae and often one or more minute pores. These setae are tapered and slightly capitate, distinguishing Ferrisia from the related genus Pseudoferrisia, which has similar ducts but their setae are slender and spine-like.

Other features of Ferrisia are 8-segmented antennae (rarely 7-segmented), a circulus being present on the abdomen, a single pair of cerarii on the anal lobes and these each having usually 2 cerarian setae, and the dorsal setae being flagellate and either blunt-tipped or slightly capitate.

== Taxonomic history ==
David T. Fullaway circumscribed the genus in 1923. He included one species: F. virgata, which was initially described in Dactylopius and had been transferred to Pseudococcus. In 1929, Ryoichi Takahashi proposed Ferrisiana as a replacement name because he thought the existence of the mollusk genus Ferrissia meant Ferrisia was an invalid junior homonym. Ferrisiana was subsequently used by other authors to refer to this genus. In the 1960s, Harold and Emily R. Morrison and Howard L. McKenzie showed that the International Code of Zoological Nomenclature says the difference of one letter is enough to distinguish genera names, making Ferrisia the valid name for the genus.

In 2012, M. B. Kaydan and P. J. Kullan circumscribed a new genus Pseudoferrisia for the species previously known as Ferrisia floridana.

== Species ==
As of 2022, species include:

- Ferrisia claviseta (Lobdell, 1930)
- Ferrisia colombiana Kaydan & Gullan, 2012
- Ferrisia cristinae Kaydan & Gullan, 2012
- Ferrisia dasylirii (Cockerell, 1896)
- Ferrisia ecuadorensis Kaydan & Gullan, 2012
- Ferrisia gilli Gullan, 2003 — Formerly thought to be a California population of F. virgata. Economically important pest of pistachios in and almonds in the state.
- Ferrisia kaki Kaydan & Pacheco da Silva, 2016
- Ferrisia kondoi Kaydan & Gullan, 2012
- Ferrisia malvastra (McDaniel, 1962)
- Ferrisia meridionalis Williams, 1985
- Ferrisia milleri Kaydan & Gullan, 2012
- Ferrisia multiformis Granara de Willink, 1991
- Ferrisia pitcairnia Kaydan & Gullan, 2012
- Ferrisia quaintancii (Tinsley, 1898)
- Ferrisia setosa (Lobdell, 1930)
- Ferrisia terani Williams & Granara de Willink, 1992
- Ferrisia uzinuri Kaydan & Gullan, 2012
- Ferrisia virgata (Cockerell, 1893)
- Ferrisia williamsi Kaydan & Gullan, 2012
