= Sinococcus =

Scientific classification
- Domain: Eukaryota
- Kingdom: Animalia
- Phylum: Arthropoda
- Class: Insecta
- Order: Hemiptera
- Suborder: Sternorrhyncha
- Family: Pseudococcidae
- Genus: Sinococcus; Wu & Zheng, 2001
- Species: S. ulmi

Binomial name
- Sinococcus ulmi Wu & Zheng, 2001

Genus of insects

Sinococcus is a genus of mealybugs (subfamily Phenacoccinae) erected by Wu & Zheng in 2001; it contains the single species Sinococcus ulmi from Ulmus in China.
