= Atrococcus =

Scientific classification
- Domain: Eukaryota
- Kingdom: Animalia
- Phylum: Arthropoda
- Class: Insecta
- Order: Hemiptera
- Suborder: Sternorrhyncha
- Family: Pseudococcidae
- Genus: Atrococcus; Goux, 1941

Genus of true bugs

Atrococcus is a genus of true bugs belonging to the family Pseudococcidae.

The species of this genus are found in Europe and Russia.

Species:

- Atrococcus achilleae (Kiritchenko, 1936)
- Atrococcus arakelianae (Ter-Grigorian, 1964)
