= Gouxia =

Scientific classification
- Kingdom: Animalia
- Phylum: Arthropoda
- Class: Insecta
- Order: Hemiptera
- Suborder: Sternorrhyncha
- Family: Pseudococcidae
- Genus: Gouxia; Koçak & Kemal, 2009
- Species: G. danielaferreroae

Binomial name
- Gouxia danielaferreroae (Goux, 1989)

Synonyms
- Giraudia Goux, 1989; Giraudia danielaferreroae Goux, 1989

Genus of true bugs

Gouxia danielaferreroae is a species of mealybug that lives in France. It was placed in a monotypic genus by Lucien Goux in 1989, but the genus name he used, Giraudia, was a junior homonym of at least two other animal genera. The genus was renamed Gouxia in his honour in 2009.
