= Peliococcus =

Scientific classification
- Domain: Eukaryota
- Kingdom: Animalia
- Phylum: Arthropoda
- Class: Insecta
- Order: Hemiptera
- Suborder: Sternorrhyncha
- Family: Pseudococcidae
- Genus: Peliococcus; Borchsenius, 1948

Genus of true bugs

Peliococcus is a genus of true bugs belonging to the family Pseudococcidae.

The genus has almost cosmopolitan distribution.

Species:

- Peliococcus agriensis
- Peliococcus albertaccius Goux, 1990
