= Rastrococcus =

Scientific classification
- Domain: Eukaryota
- Kingdom: Animalia
- Phylum: Arthropoda
- Class: Insecta
- Order: Hemiptera
- Suborder: Sternorrhyncha
- Family: Pseudococcidae
- Genus: Rastrococcus; Ferris, 1954

Genus of insects

Rastrococcus is a genus of true bugs belonging to the family Pseudococcidae.

The species of this genus are found in Africa, Southern Asia and Australia.

Species:

- Rastrococcus asteliae (Maskell, 1884)
- Rastrococcus banksiae Williams, 1985
- Rastrococcus biggeri Williams & Watson, 1988
- Rastrococcus chinensis Ferris, 1954
- Rastrococcus expeditionis Williams, 1989
- Rastrococcus iceryoides (Green, 1908)
- Rastrococcus invadens Williams, 1986
- Rastrococcus jabadiu Williams, 1989
- Rastrococcus kendariensis Gavrilov-Zimin, 2013
- Rastrococcus lamingtoniensis Williams, 1985
- Rastrococcus mangiferae (Green, 1896)
- Rastrococcus matileae Williams & Watson, 1988
- Rastrococcus melaleucae Williams, 1985
- Rastrococcus monachus Williams, 1989
- Rastrococcus namartini Williams & Henderson, 2005
- Rastrococcus neoguineensis Williams & Watson, 1988
- Rastrococcus nivalis (Maskell, 1893)
- Rastrococcus rubellus Williams, 1989
- Rastrococcus spinosus (Robinson, 1918)
- Rastrococcus stolatus (Froggatt, 1917)
- Rastrococcus taprobanicus Williams, 1989
- Rastrococcus tropicasiaticus
- Rastrococcus truncatispinus Williams, 1985
- Rastrococcus vicorum Williams & Watson, 1988
- Rastrococcus viridarii Williams, 1989
