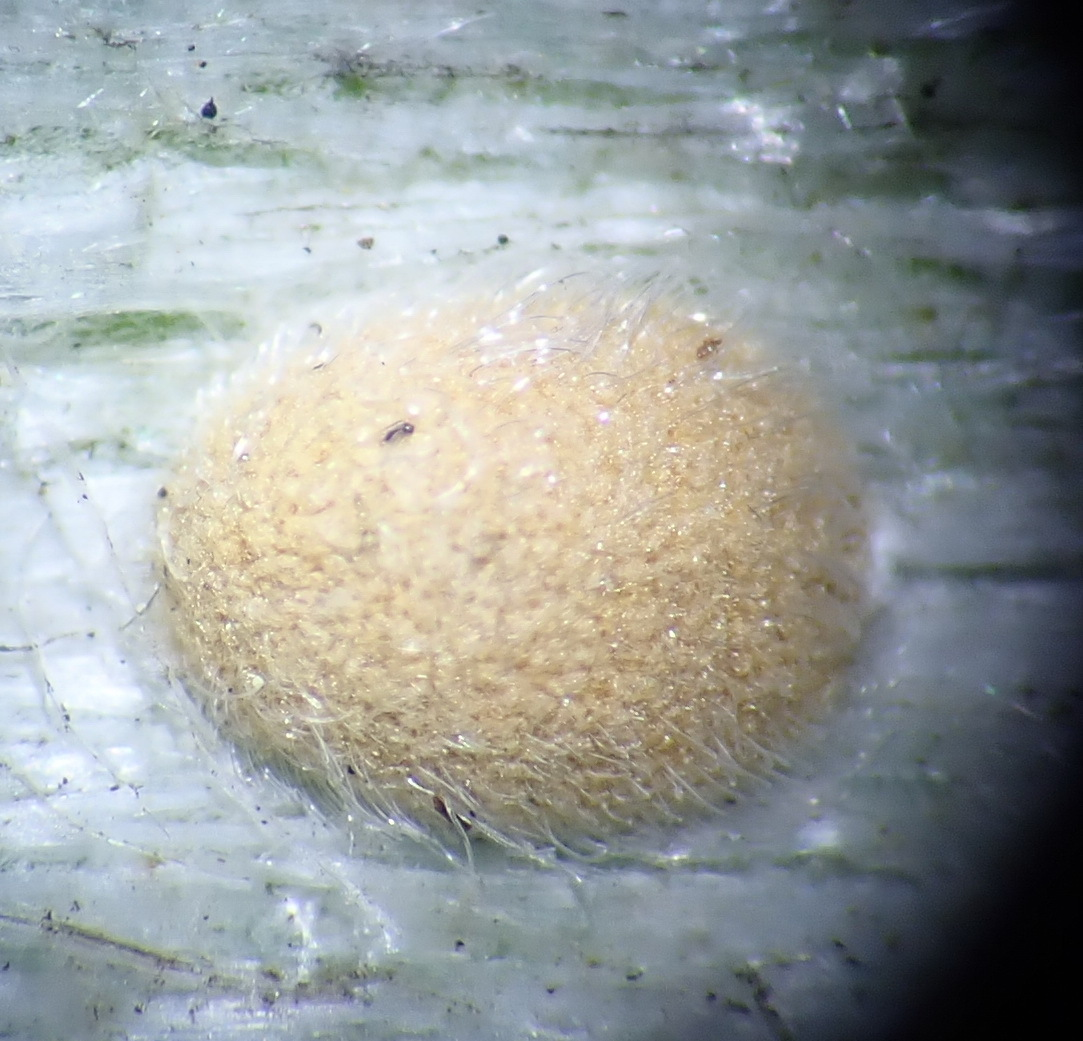
- Asteliacoccus_margaretae coccoon

Scientific classification
- Kingdom: Animalia
- Phylum: Arthropoda
- Clade: Pancrustacea
- Class: Insecta
- Order: Hemiptera
- Suborder: Sternorrhyncha
- Family: Pseudococcidae
- Genus: Asteliacoccus; Williams, 1985

Type species
- Asteliacoccus margaretae Williams, 1985

= Asteliacoccus =

Genus of true bugs

Asteliacoccus is a genus of mealybugs in the family Pseudococcidae, first described by Douglas John Williams in 1985, which currently consists of two species, Asteliacoccus margaretae, and Asteliacoccus zelandigena.
