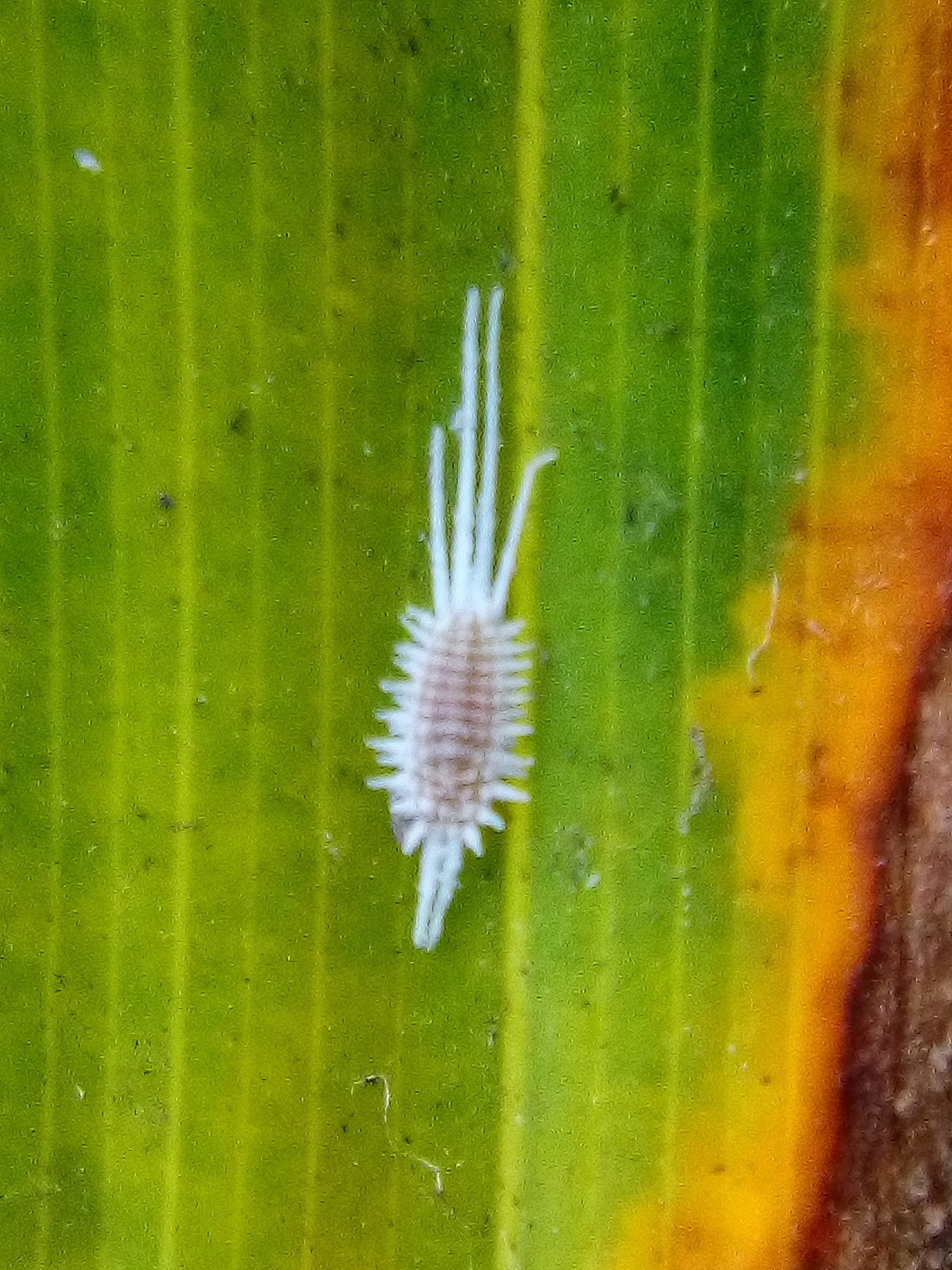
- Laminicoccus flandersi

Scientific classification
- Domain: Eukaryota
- Kingdom: Animalia
- Phylum: Arthropoda
- Class: Insecta
- Order: Hemiptera
- Suborder: Sternorrhyncha
- Family: Pseudococcidae
- Genus: Laminicoccus; Williams, 1960

Type species
- Tylococcus giffardi

= Laminicoccus =

Genus of insects

Laminicoccus is a genus of mealy-bugs belonging to the family Pseudococcidae. The genus was first described in 1960 by Williams.

Species of this genus are found in both Australia and New Zealand.

== Species ==
The Encyclopedia of Life lists six species:

- Laminicoccus asteliae Cox 1987
- Laminicoccus eastopi Cox 1987
- Laminicoccus flandersi Williams 1985
- Laminicoccus pandani (Cockerell 1895) (Mealybug)
- Laminicoccus pandanicola (Takahashi 1939)
- Laminicoccus vitiensis (Green & Laing 1924)
