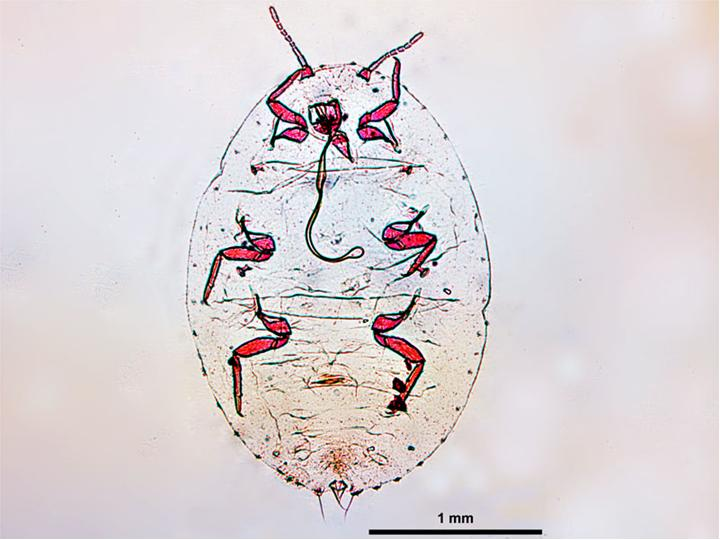
- Dysmiccocus brevipes

Scientific classification
- Domain: Eukaryota
- Kingdom: Animalia
- Phylum: Arthropoda
- Class: Insecta
- Order: Hemiptera
- Suborder: Sternorrhyncha
- Family: Pseudococcidae
- Genus: Dysmicoccus

= Dysmicoccus =

Genus of insects

Dysmicoccus is a genus of scales and mealybugs in the family Pseudococcidae. There are at least 110 described species in Dysmicoccus.

== See also ==
- List of Dysmicoccus species
