= Planococcoides =

Scientific classification
- Domain: Eukaryota
- Kingdom: Animalia
- Phylum: Arthropoda
- Class: Insecta
- Order: Hemiptera
- Suborder: Sternorrhyncha
- Family: Pseudococcidae
- Genus: Planococcoides; Ezzat & McConnell, 1956

Genus of insects

Planococcoides is a genus of true bugs belonging to the family Pseudococcidae.

Species:

- Planococcoides anaboranae (Mamet, 1959)
- Planococcoides bengalensis Ghosh & Ghose, 1988
- Planococcoides celtis (Strickland, 1947)
- Planococcoides crassus (De Lotto, 1961)
- Planococcoides formosus (De Lotto, 1961)
- Planococcoides ireneus De Lotto, 1964
- Planococcoides lamabokensis (Balachowsky & Ferrero, 1966)
- Planococcoides lindingeri (Bodenheiemr, 1924)
- Planococcoides lingnani (Ferris, 1954)
- Planococcoides macarangae (Takahashi, 1940)
- Planococcoides mumensis (Tang, 1977)
- Planococcoides njalensis (Laing, 1929)
- Planococcoides pauliani Mamet, 1959
- Planococcoides robustus Ezzat & McConnell, 1956
- Planococcoides rotundatus (De Lotto, 1954)
