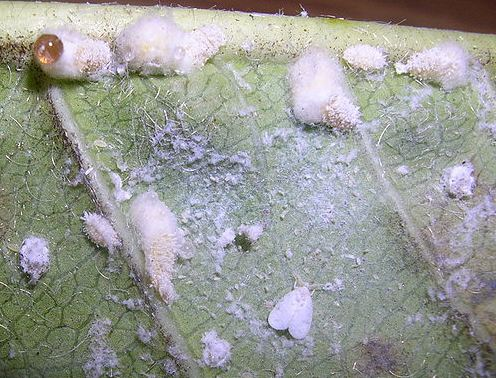
- Paracoccus marginatus

Scientific classification
- Domain: Eukaryota
- Kingdom: Animalia
- Phylum: Arthropoda
- Class: Insecta
- Order: Hemiptera
- Suborder: Sternorrhyncha
- Family: Pseudococcidae
- Genus: Paracoccus; Ezzat & McConnell, 1956

= Paracoccus (bug) =

Genus of insects

Paracoccus is a genus of true bugs belonging to the family Pseudococcidae.

The genus has cosmopolitan distribution.

Species:

- Paracoccus abnormalis Cox, 1987
- Paracoccus acaenae Cox, 1987
- Paracoccus aestuariivivens Park et al., 2016
- Paracoccus alazanensis Williams & Granara de Willink, 1992
- Paracoccus albatus Cox, 1987
- Paracoccus alcaliphilus Urakami et al., 1989
- Paracoccus alkenifer Lipski et al., 1998
- Paracoccus aminovorans Urakami et al., 1990
- Paracoccus angustae Sun et al., 2015
- Paracoccus ascius Williams & Granara de Willink, 1992
- Paracoccus aspratilis Cox, 1987
- Paracoccus baccharidicola Williams & Granara de Willink, 1992
- Paracoccus bengalensis Ghosh et al., 2006
- Paracoccus biporus Williams, 1985
- Paracoccus boumaensis
- Paracoccus bruguierae (De Lotto, 1961)
- Paracoccus burnerae (Brain, 1915)
- Paracoccus busiaensis De Lotto, 1964
- Paracoccus butcherae Cox, 1987
- Paracoccus caeni Lee et al., 2011
- Paracoccus canalis (Brittin, 1938)
- Paracoccus cavaticus Cox, 1987
- Paracoccus circuliprivis Ezzat & McConnell, 1956
- Paracoccus claudus De Lotto, 1975
- Paracoccus contaminans Kämpfer et al., 2016
- Paracoccus coriariae (Brittin, 1938)
- Paracoccus cryptus Cox, 1987
- Paracoccus deboerae Cox, 1987
- Paracoccus deceptus Cox, 1987
- Paracoccus decorus Williams & Granara de Willink, 1992
- Paracoccus definitus Cox, 1987
- Paracoccus dendricola Williams & Watson, 1988
- Paracoccus diversus (De Lotto, 1961)
- Paracoccus drimydis (Brittin, 1938)
- Paracoccus eastopi Williams, 1970
- Paracoccus erigeroni (James, 1935)
- Paracoccus ferrisi Ezzat & McConnell, 1956
- Paracoccus gillianae
- Paracoccus glaucus (Maskell, 1879)
- Paracoccus hakeae
- Paracoccus hamoni Williams & Granara de Willink, 1992
- Paracoccus hebes Cox, 1987
- Paracoccus herreni Williams & Granara de Willink, 1992
- Paracoccus huijuniae Sun et al., 2013
- Paracoccus ilu (Williams, 1970)
- Paracoccus insolitus (Brittin, 1938)
- Paracoccus interceptus Lit, 1997
- Paracoccus juniperi (Ehrhorn, 1906)
- Paracoccus kajiadoensis (De Lotto, 1961)
- Paracoccus laeviglucosivorans Nakamura, 2015
- Paracoccus larinus De Lotto, 1975
- Paracoccus latebrosus De Lotto, 1975
- Paracoccus leptospermi Cox, 1987
- Paracoccus leucadendri
- Paracoccus limuricus (De Lotto, 1961)
- Paracoccus longicauda Cox, 1987
- Paracoccus lycopersici Ezzat & McConnell, 1956
- Paracoccus marcusii Harker et al., 1998
- Paracoccus marginatus Williams & Granara de Willink, 1992
- Paracoccus melanesicus Williams & Watson, 1988
- Paracoccus methylutens Doronina et al., 1998
- Paracoccus mexicanus Ezzat & McConnell, 1956
- Paracoccus miro (de Boer, 1967)
- Paracoccus morobensis Williams & Watson, 1988
- Paracoccus multiductus Cox, 1987
- Paracoccus muraltiae (Brain, 1912)
- Paracoccus mutabilis De Lotto, 1964
- Paracoccus myrtacearum Williams & Granara de Willink, 1992
- Paracoccus nellorensis Avasthi & Shafee, 1983
- Paracoccus neocarens (Lit, 1992)
- Paracoccus niuensis Williams & Watson, 1988
- Paracoccus nothofagi Williams, 1985
- Paracoccus nothofagicola Cox, 1987
- Paracoccus oneratus Williams & Granara de Willink, 1992
- Paracoccus ordinis Williams & Granara de Willink, 1992
- Paracoccus orsomi Mamet, 1962
- Paracoccus parvicirculus Cox, 1987
- Paracoccus perperus De Lotto, 1975
- Paracoccus pinguis De Lotto, 1964
- Paracoccus poculiporus Williams, 1985
- Paracoccus podocarpi Cox, 1987
- Paracoccus ranavalonae Mamet, 1962
- Paracoccus redactus Cox, 1987
- Paracoccus reductus (Ferris, 1953)
- Paracoccus salviacola Williams & Granara de Willink, 1992
- Paracoccus solani Ezzat & McConnell, 1956
- Paracoccus spinulosus (De Lotto, 1961)
- Paracoccus sporoboli (James, 1936)
- Paracoccus tectus De Lotto, 1964
- Paracoccus townsendi (Cockerell, 1893)
- Paracoccus trichinus De Lotto, 1964
- Paracoccus trichospermi Williams & Watson, 1988
- Paracoccus tuaregensis (Balachowsky, 1951)
- Paracoccus turrialbensis Williams & Granara de Willink, 1992
- Paracoccus villanuevai (Miller & McKenzie, 1971)
- Paracoccus zealandicus (Ezzat & McConnell, 1956)
