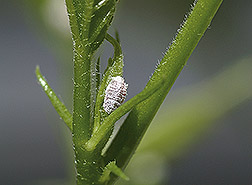
- Female

Scientific classification
- Kingdom: Animalia
- Phylum: Arthropoda
- Clade: Pancrustacea
- Class: Insecta
- Order: Hemiptera
- Suborder: Sternorrhyncha
- Family: Pseudococcidae
- Genus: Maconellicoccus
- Species: M. hirsutus

Binomial name
- Maconellicoccus hirsutus Green, 1908

= Maconellicoccus hirsutus =

Species of true bug

Maconellicoccus hirsutus, (also known as the pink, grape or hibiscus mealybug) is a pest of many plants, trees, and shrubs. It infests hibiscus, citrus, coffee, sugar cane, annonas, plums, guava, mango (although, mango mealybug is more problematic), okra, sorrel, teak, mora, pigeon pea, peanut, grapevine, maize, asparagus, chrysanthemum, beans, cotton, soybean, cocoa, and many other plants. The pest forms colonies on the host plant, and if left undisturbed, the colonies will grow into large masses of white waxy coverings on branches, fruiting structures, leaves, and even whole plants, including large trees.

== Lifecycle ==
Both female and male adult hibiscus mealybugs are about one-eighth inch (3 mm) long. Female bodies are pink in color with a white waxy covering. They are wingless and appear as ovoid shapes covered by a mass of white mealy wax. Males have a pair of wings and two long waxy tails and are capable of flight.

The mature female lays eggs in an egg sack of white wax, usually in clusters on the twigs, branches, and bark of the host plant, and also on the plant's leaves and terminal ends. Eggs are initially orange in color but turn pink on maturity. Egg development takes between 3 and 9 days. Eggs are minute, varying from 0.3 to 0.4 mm in length and number as many as 654 eggs per sack. In its egg stage, the hibiscus mealybug disperses most easily by wind. The wax, which sticks to each egg, also facilitates passive transport by animals or man. Reproduction may occur by means of parthenogenesis in the absence of the male.

Newly hatched nymphs are called crawlers and are very mobile. They may disperse over the host, especially toward tender growing parts, or be carried away by wind, man, or animals. The nymphal stages appear much like the female in form, but the female nymphs have three instars, while male nymphs have four instars. The last instar of the male is an inactive stage with wing buds within a cocoon of mealy wax. The nymphal stages may last for as long as 30 days. The hibiscus mealybug can complete its entire life cycle in 23 to 30 days. Under optimum laboratory conditions, there can be as many as 15 generations a year.

== Effects and distribution ==
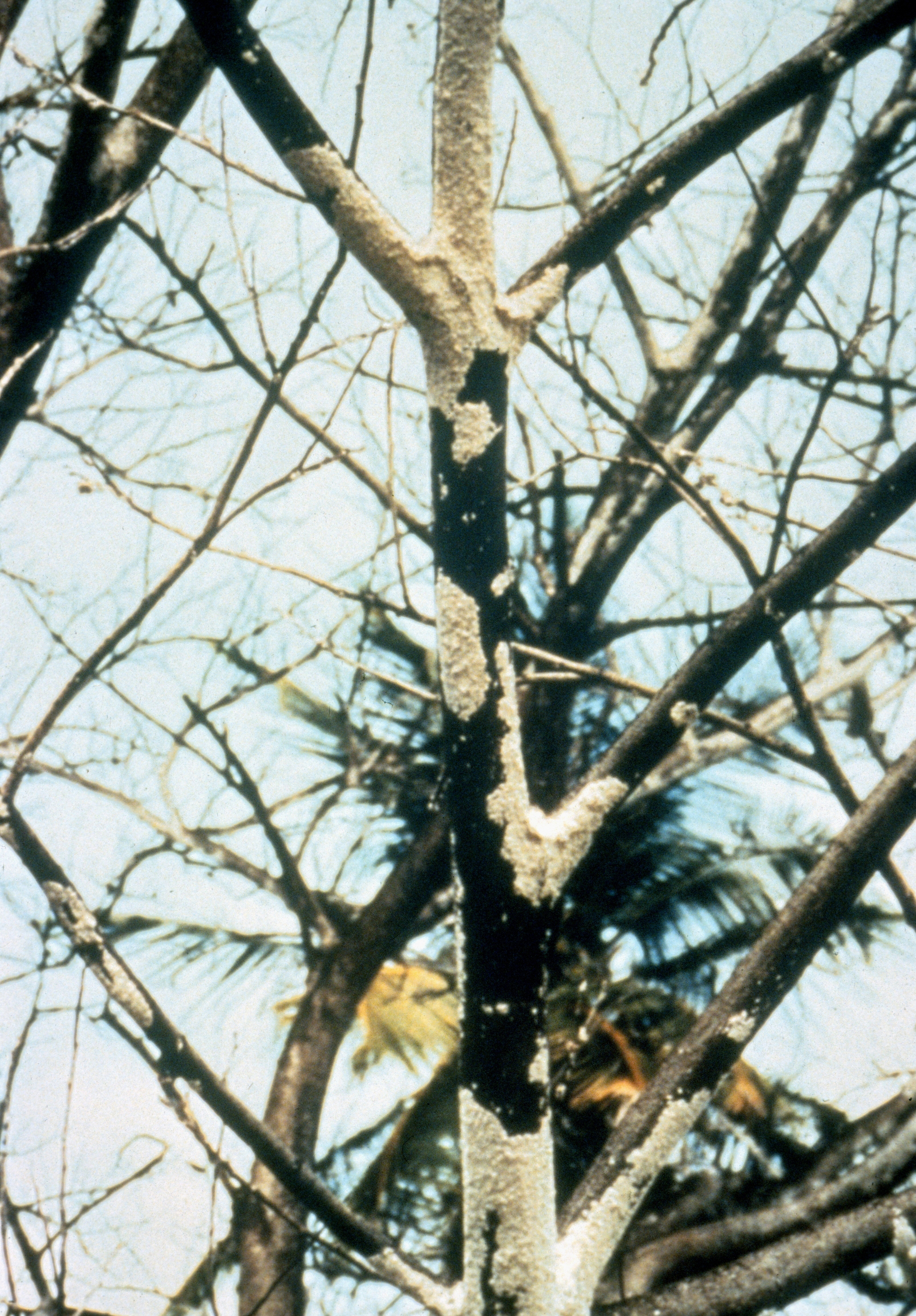
Albizia saman tree infested and killed

As it feeds, the hibiscus mealybug injects into the plant a toxic saliva that results in malformed leaf and shoot growth, stunting, and occasional death. Leaves show a characteristic curling, similar to damage caused by viruses. Heavily infested plants have shortened internodes leading to resetting or a "bunchy top" appearance. A heavy, black, sooty mold may develop on an infested plant's leaves and stems as a result of the mealybug's heavy honey-dew secretions. When fruits are infested, they can be entirely covered with the white waxy coating of the mealybug. Infestation can lead to fruit drop, or fruit may remain on the host in a dried and shriveled condition. If flower blossoms are attacked, the fruit sets poorly. In plants such as peanuts, potatoes, and some grasses, the pest has been reported to attack the root systems.

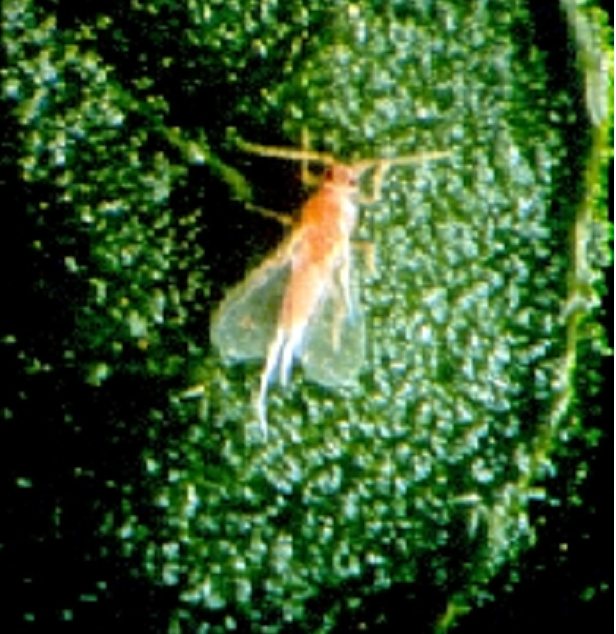
Adult male

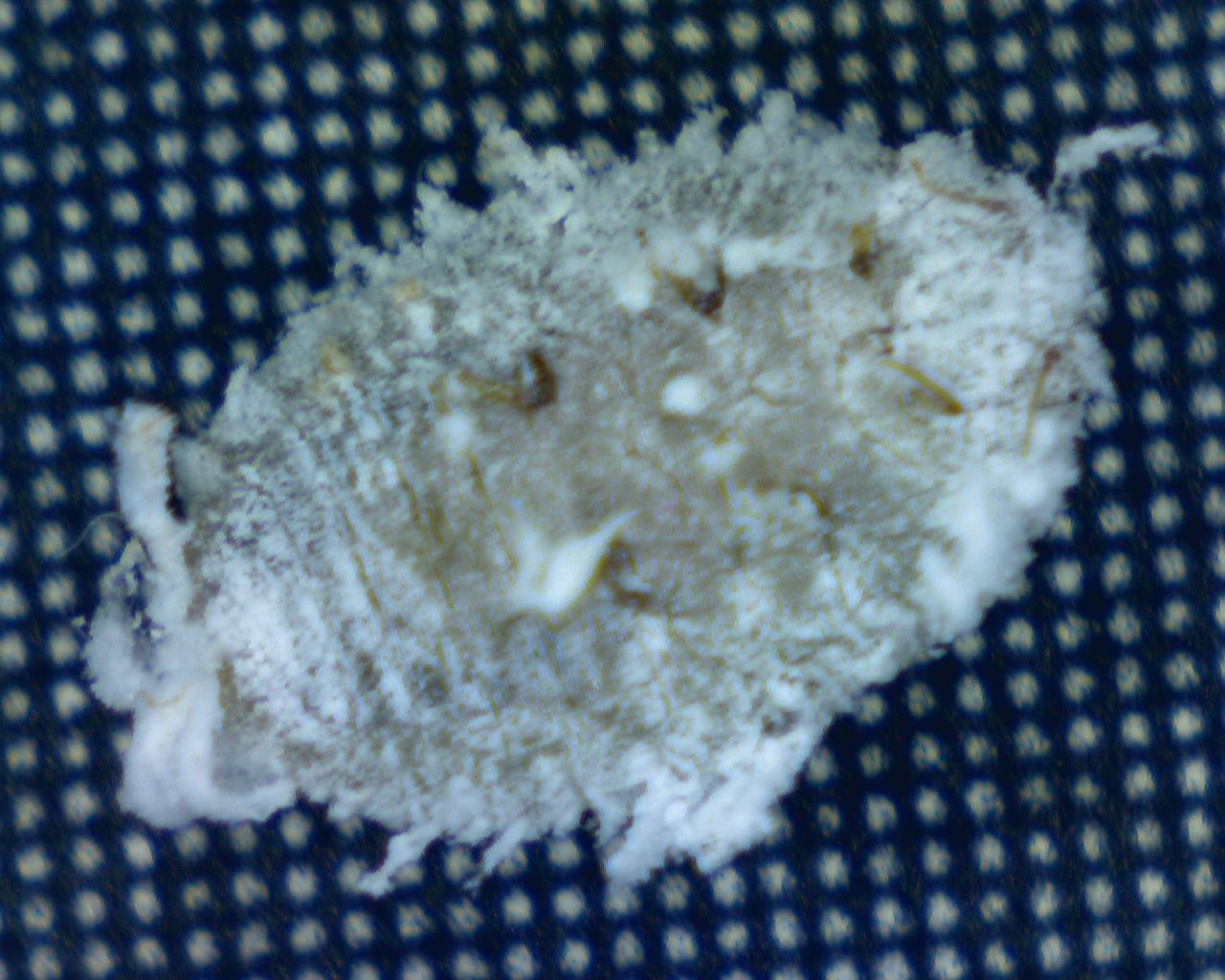
Upside down view

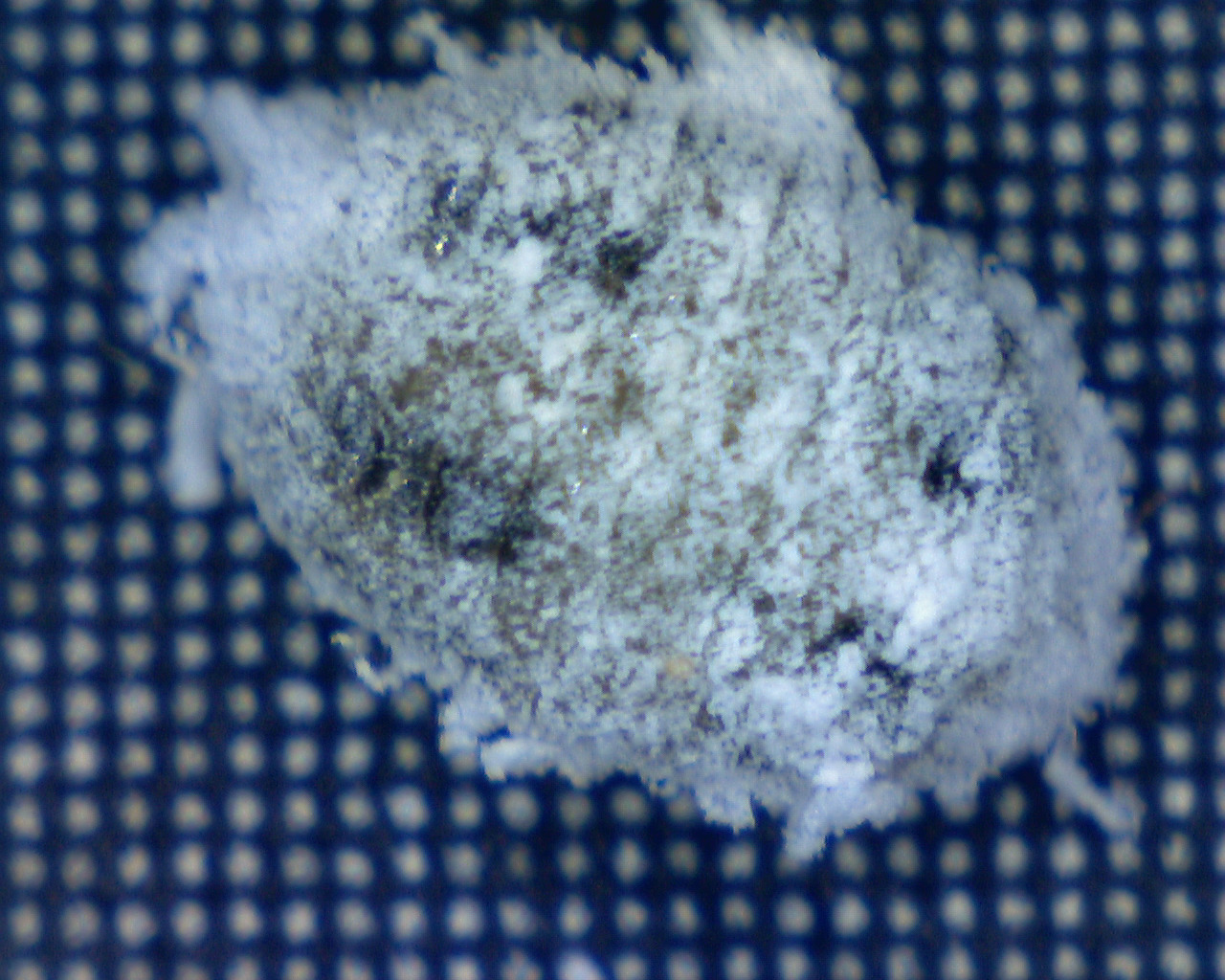
View from top under a microscope

This pest occurs in most tropical areas of the world, including Asia, the Middle East, Africa, Australia, and Oceania. The hibiscus mealybug arrived in Egypt from India in 1912 and in Hawaii in 1984. It appeared in Grenada, Trinidad, and St. Kitts in the 1990s. It is a very serious pest in the Caribbean where it attacks many hosts of economic importance and disrupts Caribbean agricultural trade and commerce. Wingless crawlers, nymphs, and females have been known to travel short distances over the ground to get to other host plants in adjoining fields. Agricultural commerce is also responsible for the pest's spread. The species had spread to California, Mexico, Central America and to Florida in 2002. The adult female mealybug produces a blend of two compounds that function as a female sex pheromone, highly attractive to males. The pheromone can be used to trap males or to indicate the presence of a population of pink hibiscus mealybugs in the field.
