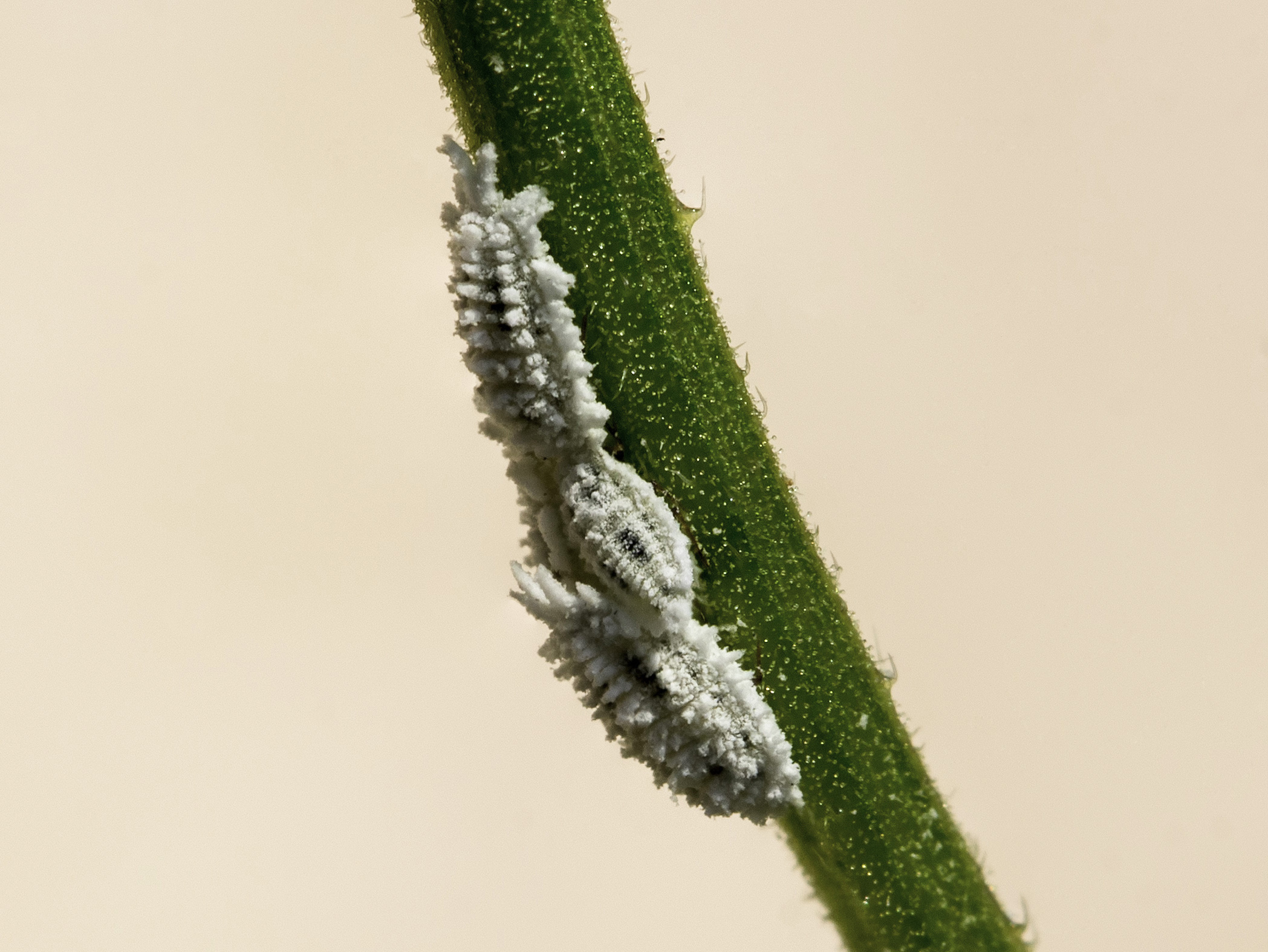
- Mealybugs on a flower stem in Yogyakarta

Scientific classification
- Kingdom: Animalia
- Phylum: Arthropoda
- Clade: Pancrustacea
- Class: Insecta
- Order: Hemiptera
- Suborder: Sternorrhyncha
- Superfamily: Coccoidea
- Family: Pseudococcidae; Heymons, 1915

= Mealybug =

Pseudococcidae

Family of insects (Pseudococcidae)

Mealybugs are insects in the family Pseudococcidae, unarmored scale insects found in moist, warm habitats. Of the more than 2,000 described species, many are considered pests, as they feed on plant juices of greenhouse plants, house plants, and subtropical trees and also act as a vector for several plant diseases. Some ants live in symbiotic relationships with them, protecting them from predators and feeding off the honeydew that they excrete.

== Description ==
A video of a mealybug

Mealybugs are sexually dimorphic; females appear as nymphs, exhibiting reduced morphology, and lack wings, although unlike many female scale insects, they often retain legs and can move. Males are smaller, gnat-like, and have wings. Since mealybugs, as well as all other Hemiptera, are hemimetabolous insects, they do not undergo complete metamorphosis in the true sense of the word. However, male mealybugs exhibit a radical change during their lifecycle, changing from wingless, ovoid nymphs to flying adults.

Mealybug females feed on plant sap, normally in roots or other crevices, and in a few cases the bottoms of stored fruit. They attach themselves to plants and secrete a powdery wax layer (hence the name "mealy" bug) used for protection while they suck the plants' juices. The males are short-lived, as they do not feed at all as adults and only live to fertilize the females. Male citrus mealy bugs fly to the females and resemble fluffy gnats.

Some species of mealybug lay their eggs in the same waxy layer used for protection in quantities of 50–100; other species are born directly from the female.

The most serious pests are mealybugs that feed on citrus. Other species damage sugarcane, grapes, pineapple, coffee trees, cassava, ferns, cacti, gardenias, papaya, banana, mulberry, sunflower, and orchids. Mealybugs only tend to be serious pests in the presence of ants because the ants protect them from predators and parasites. Mealybugs are also a vector of viruses in grapevines, spreading grapevine leafroll and grapevine red blotch viruses.

Mealybugs also infest some species of carnivorous plants such as Sarracenia (pitcher plants). In such cases, eradicating them is difficult without repeated applications of insecticide such as diazinon. Small infestations may not inflict significant damage. In larger amounts, though, they can induce leaf drop. In recent years, some of the mealybug species have become invasive pests in localities posing a great problem to the new agroecosystems. In India, Withania somnifera plants have been reported as a new reservoir host for an invasive mealybug species Phenacoccus solenopsis.

Some mealybugs of the Hypogeococcus genus are used as biological pest controls of invasive cacti in South Africa, including Harrisia balansae, H. martinii, and Opuntia cespitosa.

Fossil specimens of genus Acropyga ants have been recovered from the Burdigalian-stage Dominican amber deposits and several individuals are preserved carrying the extinct mealybug genus Electromyrmococcus. These fossils represent the oldest record of the symbiosis between mealybugs and Acropyga ants.

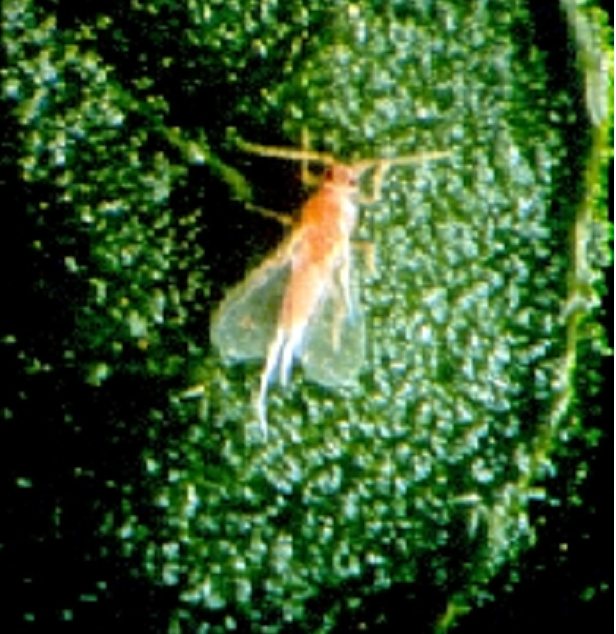
Male hibiscus mealybug, Maconellicoccus hirsutus

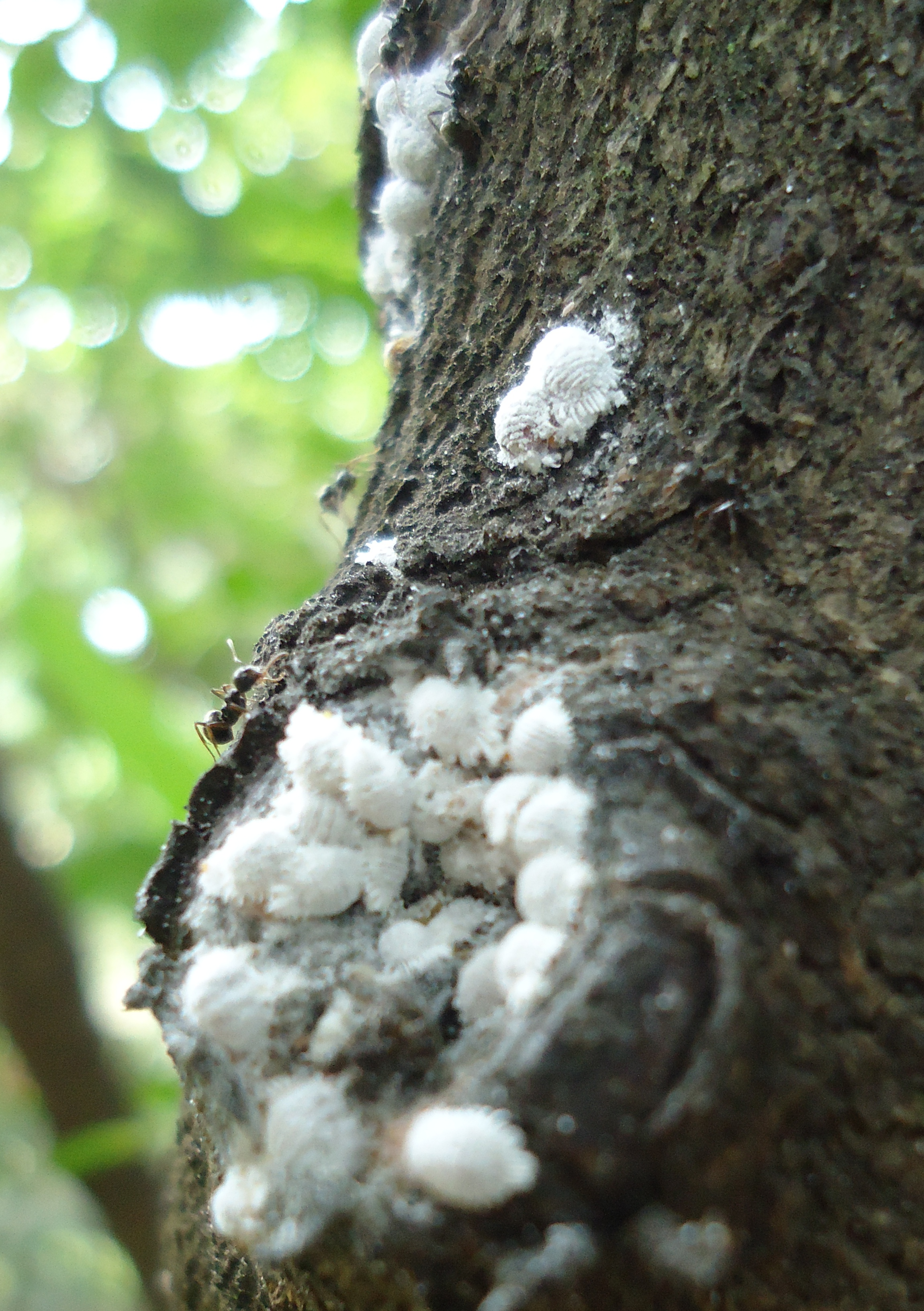
Formica fusca ants tending a herd of mealybugs

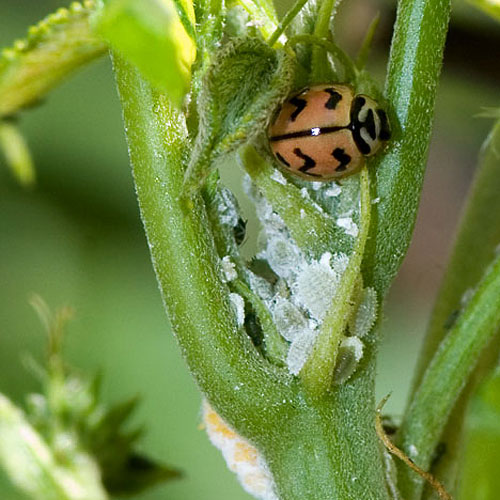
A ladybird preying on mealybugs

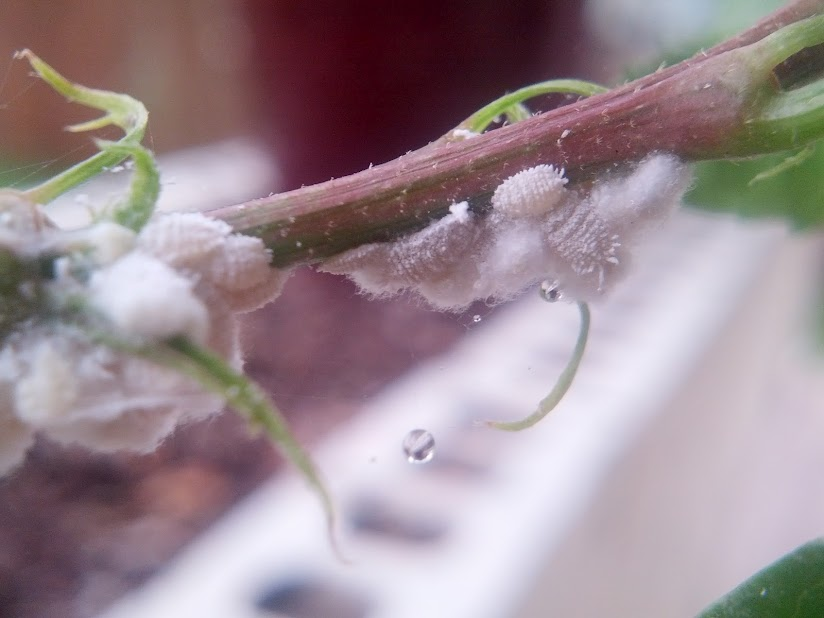
Mealybugs on hibiscus plant

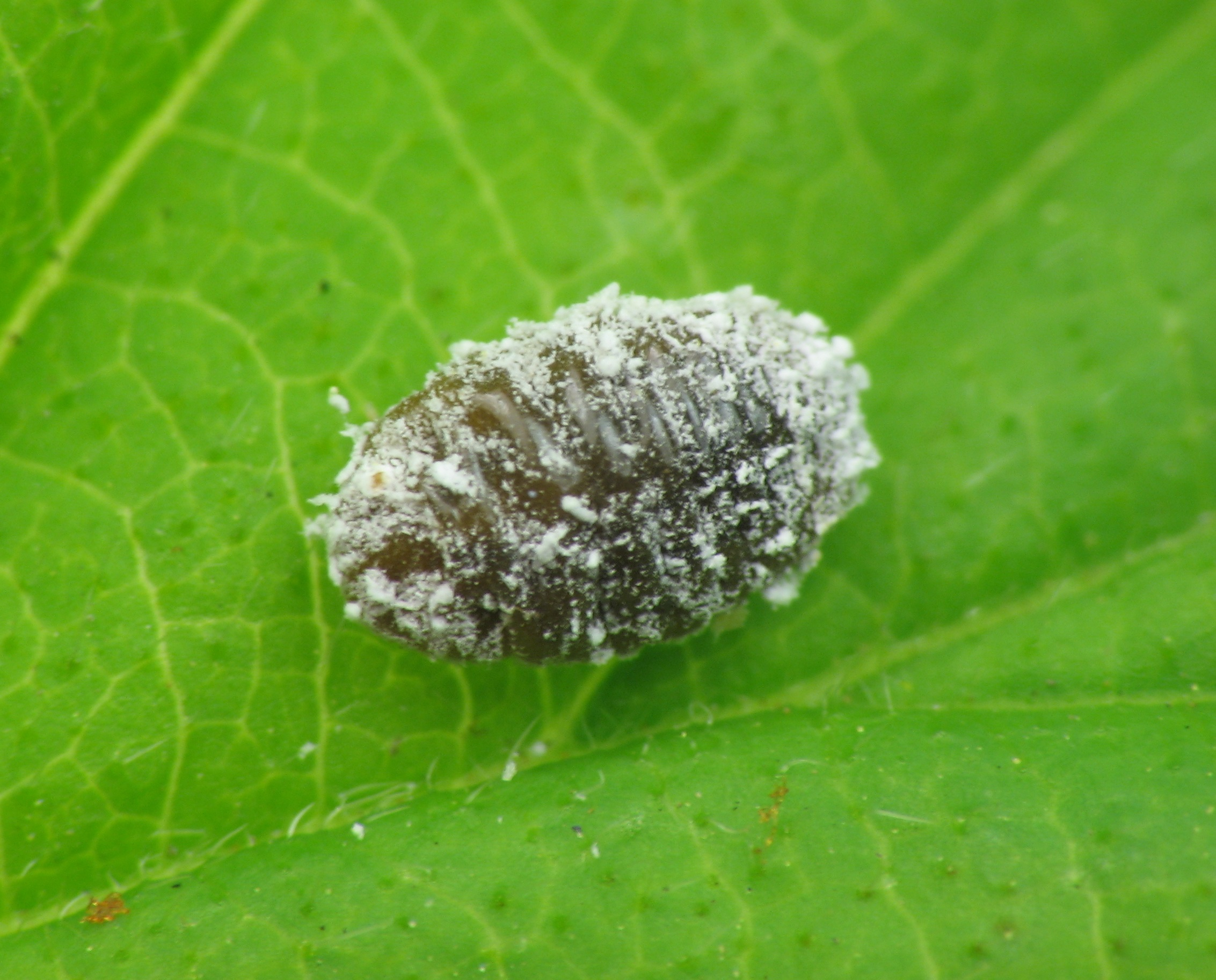
Phenacoccus aceris

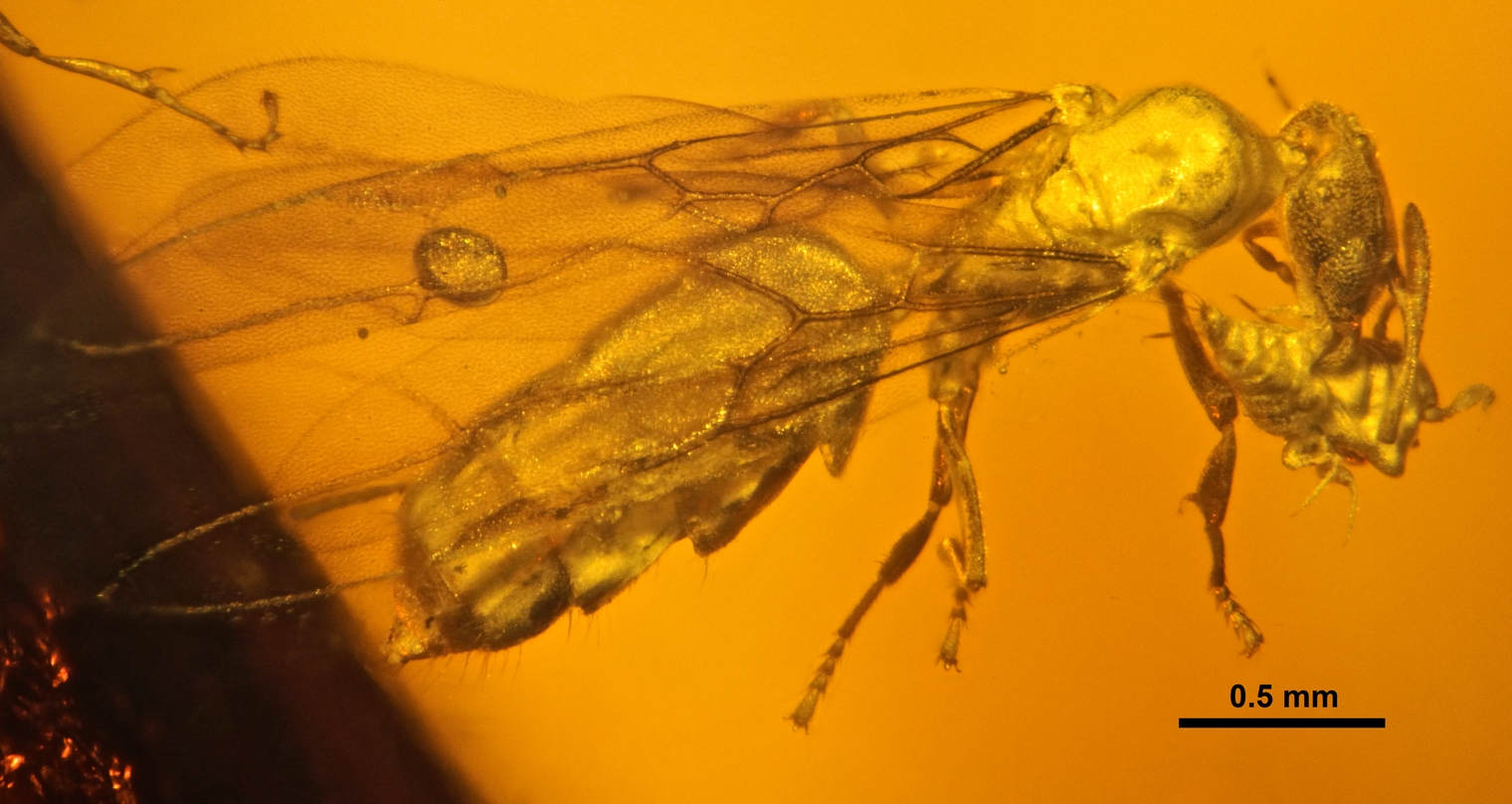
Acropyga glaesaria ant carrying an Electromyrmococcus abductus mealybug

== Control methods ==
Insecticides such as pyrethroids (e.g. permethrin, bifenthrin, or cyfluthrin) have been used for control, but this approach is often considered counterproductive due to mortality of mealybug natural enemies.

Some gardeners use species of predatory beetles (e.g. Cryptolaemus) and green lacewings (Chrysopidae) larvae to control mealybug infestations, as the larval lacewings are voracious predators of aphids and other small insects.

== Metabolism ==
Mealybugs have a highly sophisticated metabolism that involves two bacterial endosymbionts, one inside the other. The endosymbionts make essential amino acids that the mealybug is not able to acquire directly from its diet. Genetically, mealybugs rely on a "mosaic" of metabolic pathways in which proteins are transported across membranes between what were once independent organisms.

== Similar family ==
Cochineals, commonly called mealybugs, share a very similar physical appearance and size, but mealybugs (Pseudococcidae) are in a different family to cochineals (Dactylopiidae), which has several species. In Oaxaca, Mexico, cochineals, known as cochinilla algodonosa, are intentionally cultivated and farmed. The dried bugs are ground into a dust, producing a red dye (carmine) that is used in fabric dyeing, artist's paints, and cosmetics.

== Genera ==
These genera are included in BioLib.cz:

1. Acaciacoccus Williams & Matile-Ferrero, 1994
2. Acinicoccus Williams, 1985
3. Acrochordonus Cox, 1987
4. Adelosoma Borchsenius, 1948
5. Aemulantonina Williams, 2004
6. Agastococcus Cox, 1987
7. Albertinia de Lotto, 1971
8. Allococcus Ezzat & McConnell, 1956
9. Allomyrmococcus Takahashi, 1941
10. Allotrionymus Takahashi, 1958
11. Amonostherium Morrison & Morrison, 1922
12. Anaparaputo Borchsenius, 1962
13. Anisococcus Ferris, 1950
14. Annulococcus James, 1936
15. Anthelococcus McKenzie, 1964
16. Antonina Signoret, 1875
17. Antoninella Kiritchenko, 1938
18. Antoninoides Ferris, 1953
19. Apodastococcus Williams, 1985
20. Archeomyrmococcus Williams, 2002
21. Artemicoccus Balachowsky, 1953
22. Asaphococcus Cox, 1987
23. Asphodelococcus Morrison, 1945
24. Asteliacoccus Williams, 1985
25. Atriplicicoccus Williams & Granara de Willink, 1992
26. Atrococcus Goux, 1941
27. Australicoccus Williams, 1985
28. Australiputo Williams, 1985
29. Balachowskya Gomez-Menor, 1956
30. Balanococcus Williams, 1962
31. Benedictycoccina Kozár & Foldi, 2004
32. Bessenayla Goux, 1988
33. Birendracoccus Ali, 1975
34. Bolbococcus Williams, 2002
35. Boninococcus Kawai, 1973
36. Boreococcus Danzig, 1960
37. Borneococcus Williams, 2002
38. Bouhelia Balachowsky, 1938
39. Brevennia Goux, 1940
40. Brevicoccus Hambleton, 1946
41. Calicoccus Balachowsky, 1959
42. Callitricoccus Williams, 1985
43. Calyptococcus Borchsenius, 1948
44. Cannococcus Borchsenius, 1960
45. Casuarinaloma Froggatt, 1933
46. Cataenococcus Ferris, 1955
47. Caulococcus Borchsenius, 1960
48. Chaetococcus Maskell, 1898
49. Chaetotrionymus Williams, 1985
50. Chloeoon Anderson, 1788
51. Chlorizococcus McKenzie, 1960
52. Chlorococcus Beardsley, 1971
53. Chryseococcus Cox, 1987
54. Cintococcus Goux, 1940
55. Circaputo McKenzie, 1962
56. Clavicoccus Ferris, 1948
57. Coccidella Hambleton, 1946
58. Coccidohystrix Lindinger, 1943
59. Coccura Šulc, 1908
60. Coleococcus Borchsenius, 1962
61. Conicoccus Goux, 1994
62. Conicosoma de Lotto, 1971
63. Conulicoccus Williams, 1985
64. Coorongia Williams, 1985
65. Cormiococcus Williams, 1989
66. Crenicoccus Williams, 2004
67. Criniticoccus Williams, 1960
68. Crisicoccus Ferris, 1950
69. Crocydococcus Cox, 1987
70. Cryptoripersia Cockerell, 1899
71. Cucullococcus Ferris, 1941
72. Cyperia De Lotto, 1964
73. Cypericoccus Williams, 1985
74. Cyphonococcus Cox, 1987
75. Dawa Williams, 1985
76. Delococcus Ferris, 1955
77. Delottococcus Cox & Ben-Dov, 1986
78. Dicranococcus Williams, 2002
79. Discococcus Ferris, 1953
80. Distichlicoccus Ferris, 1950
81. Diversicrus de Lotto, 1971
82. Doryphorococcus Williams, 2002
83. Drymococcus Borchsenius, 1962
84. Dysmicoccus Ferris, 1950
85. Eastia De Lotto, 1964
86. Ehrhornia Ferris, 1918
87. Epicoccus Cockerell, 1902
88. Eriocorys de Lotto, 1967
89. Erioides Green, 1922
90. Erium Cockerell, 1897
91. Eucalyptococcus Williams, 1985
92. Eumirococcus Ter-Grigorian, 1964
93. Eumyrmococcus Silvestri, 1926
94. Eupeliococcus Sãvescu, 1985
95. Euripersia Borchsenius, 1948
96. Eurycoccus Ferris, 1950
97. Exallomochlus Williams, 2004
98. Exilipedronia Williams, 1960
99. Extanticoccus Williams, 2004
100. Farinococcus Morrison, 1922
101. Ferrisia Fullaway, 1923
102. Ferrisicoccus Ezzat & McConnell, 1956
103. Fijicoccus Williams & Watson, 1988
104. Fonscolombia Lichtenstein, 1877
105. Formicococcus Takahashi, 1928
106. Gallulacoccus Beardsley, 1971
107. Geococcus Green, 1902
108. Glycycnyza Danzig, 1974
109. Gouxia Koçak & Kemal, 2009 (Note: synonym of Giraudia: monotypic Gouxia danielaferreroae (Goux, 1989).)
110. Gomezmenoricoccus Kozar & Walter, 1985
111. Greenoripersia Bodenheimer, 1929
112. Grewiacoccus Brain, 1918
113. Grewiacococcus Brain, 1918
114. Hadrococcus Williams, 1985
115. Hambletonrhizoecus Kozár & Konczné Benedicty, 2005
116. Heliococcus Šulc, 1912
117. Hemisphaerococcus Borchsenius, 1934
118. Heterococcopsis Borchsenius, 1948
119. Heterococcus Ferris, 1918
120. Hippeococcus Reyne, 1954
121. Hopefoldia Foldi, 1988
122. Hordeolicoccus Williams, 2004
123. Humoccoccus Ferris, 1953
124. Humococcus Ferris, 1953
125. Hypogeococcus Rau, 1938
126. Iberococcus Gomez-Menor Ortega, 1928
127. Idiococcus Takahashi & Kanda, 1939
128. Inopicoccus Danzig, 1971
129. Ityococcus Williams, 1985
130. Kaicoccus Takahashi, 1958
131. Kenmorea Williams, 1985
132. Kermicus Newstead, 1897
133. Kiritshenkella Borchsenius, 1948
134. Lachnodiella Hempel, 1910
135. Lachnodiopsis Borchsenius, 1960
136. Lacombia Goux, 1940
137. Laingiococcus Morrison, 1945
138. Laminicoccus Williams, 1960
139. Lanceacoccus Williams, 2004
140. Lantanacoccus Williams & Granara de Willink, 1992
141. Lenania De Lotto, 1964
142. Leococcus Kanda, 1959
143. Leptococcus Reyne, 1961
144. Leptorhizoecus Williams, 1998
145. Liucoccus Borchsenius, 1960
146. Lomatococcus Borchsenius, 1960
147. Londiania De Lotto, 1964
148. Longicoccus Danzig, 1975
149. Maconellicoccus Ezzat, 1958
150. Macrocepicoccus Morrison, 1919
151. Macrocerococcus Leonardi, 1907
152. Maculicoccus Williams, 1960
153. Madacanthococcus Mamet, 1959
154. Madagasia Mamet, 1962
155. Madangiacoccus Williams, 1985
156. Madeurycoccus Mamet, 1959
157. Malaicoccus Takahashi, 1950
158. Malekoccus Matile-Ferrero, 1988
159. Mammicoccus Balachowsky, 1959
160. Marendellea de Lotto, 1967
161. Mascarenococcus Mamet, 1940
162. Maskellococcus Cox, 1987
163. Mediococcus Kiritschenko, 1936
164. Melanococcus Williams, 1985
165. Metadenopsis Matesova, 1966
166. Metadenopus Sulc, 1933
167. Miconicoccus Williams & Miller, 1999
168. Mirococcopsis Borchsenius, 1948
169. Mirococcus Borchsenius, 1947
170. Miscanthicoccus Takahashi, 1958
171. Misericoccus Ferris, 1953
172. Mollicoccus Williams, 1960
173. Mombasinia De Lotto, 1964
174. Moystonia Williams, 1985
175. Mutabilicoccus Williams, 1960
176. Naiacoccus Green, 1919
177. Nairobia De Lotto, 1964
178. Natalensia Brain, 1915
179. Neochavesia Williams & de Willink, 1992
180. Neoclavicoccus Cohic, 1959
181. Neorhizoecus Hambleton, 1916
182. Neoripersia Kanda, 1943
183. Neosimmondsia Laing, 1930
184. Neotrionymus Borchsenius, 1948
185. Nesococcus Ehrhorn, 1916
186. Nesopedronia Beardsley, 1971
187. Nesticoccus Tang, 1977
188. Nipaecoccus Šulc, 1945
189. Octococcus Hall, 1939
190. Odacoccus Williams & Watson, 1988
191. Ohiacoccus Beardsley, 1971
192. Oracella Ferris, 1950
193. Orstomicoccus Mamet, 1962
194. Oudablis Signoret, 1882
195. Oxyacanthus Chevallier, 1836
196. Palaucoccus Beardsley, 1966
197. Palmicultor Williams, 1963
198. Paludicoccus Ferris, 1918
199. Pandanicola Beardsley, 1966
200. Papuacoccus Williams & Watson, 1988
201. Paracoccus Ezzat & McConnell, 1956
202. Paradiscococcus Williams, 1985
203. Paradoxococcus McKenzie, 1962
204. Paraferrisia Williams & de Boer, 1973
205. Paramococcus Foldi & Cox, 1989
206. Paramonostherium Williams, 1985
207. Paramyrmococcus Takahashi, 1941
208. Parapaludicoccus Mamet, 1962
209. Parapedronia Balachowsky, 1953
210. Paraputo Laing, 1929
211. Pararhodania Ter-Grigorian, 1964
212. Paratrionymus Borchsenius, 1948
213. Pedrococcus Mamet, 1942
214. Pedronia Green, 1922
215. Peliococcopsis Borchesenius, 1948
216. Peliococcus Borchsenius, 1948
217. Pellizzaricoccus Kozar, 1991
218. Penthococcus Danzig, 1972
219. Peridiococcus Williams, 1985
220. Perystrix Gavrilov, 2004
221. Phenacoccopsis Borchsenius, 1948
222. Phenacoccus Cockerell, 1893
223. Pilococcus Takahashi, 1928
224. Planococcoides Ezzat & McConnell, 1956
225. Planococcus Ferris, 1950
226. Pleistocerarius Matile-Ferrero, 1970
227. Plotococcus Miller & Denno, 1977
228. Poecilococcus Brookes, 1981
229. Polystomophora Borchsenius, 1948
230. Porococcus Cockerell, 1898
231. Promyrmococcus Williams, 2002
232. Prorhizoecus Miller & McKenzie, 1971
233. Prorsococcus Williams, 1985
234. Pseudantonina Green, 1922
235. Pseudococcus Westwood, 1840
236. Pseudorhizoecus Green, 1933
237. Pseudorhodania Borchsenius, 1962
238. Pseudoripersia Cockerell, 1899
239. Pseudotrionymus Beardsley, 1971
240. Pygmaeococcus McKenzie, 1960
241. Quadrigallicoccus Williams & Miller, 1999
242. Radicoccus Hambleton, 1946
243. Rastrococcus Ferris, 1954
244. Renicaula Cox, 1987
245. Rhizoecus Künckel d'Herculais, 1878
246. Rhodania Goux, 1935
247. Ripersia Signoret, 1875
248. Ritsemia Lichtenstein, 1879
249. Saccharicoccus Ferris, 1950
250. Saliococcus Kanda, 1934
251. Sarococcus Williams & de Boer, 1973
252. Scaptococcus McKenzie, 1964
253. Seabrina Neves, 1943
254. Serrolecanium Shinji, 1935
255. Seyneria Goux, 1990
256. Sinococcus Wu & Zheng, 2001
257. Spartinacoccus Kosztarab, 1996
258. Sphaerococcus Maskell, 1892
259. Spilococcus Ferris, 1950
260. Stachycoccus Borchsenius, 1962
261. Stemmatomerinx Ferris, 1950
262. Stipacoccus Tang, 1992
263. Strandanna De Lotto, 1969
264. Strombococcus Williams, 1985
265. Synacanthococcus Morrison, 1920
266. Syrmococcus Ferris, 1953
267. Takahashicoccus Kanda, 1959
268. Tasmanicoccus Williams, 1985
269. Thaimyrmococcus Williams, 2002
270. Tomentocera Beardsley, 1964
271. Trabutina Marchal, 1904
272. Trabutinella Borchsenius, 1948
273. Trechocorys Curtis, 1843
274. Tridiscus Ferris, 1950
275. Trimerococcus Balachowsky, 1952
276. Trionymus Berg, 1899
277. Trochiscococcus Williams & Pellizzari, 1997
278. Tylococcus Newstead, 1897
279. Tympanococcus Williams, 1967
280. Ventrispina Williams, 1985
281. Villosicoccus Williams, 1985
282. Volvicoccus Goux, 1945
283. Vryburgia De Lotto, 1967
284. Xenococcus Silvestri, 1924
285. Yudnapinna Williams, 1985

Extinct genera:

- †Electromyrmococcus Williams, 2001
- †Phyllococcus Ehrhorn, 1916 (monotypic)

Note:

- the genus Puto is now placed in its own family
- Lachnodius Maskell, 1896 is now placed in the Eriococcidae
