= List of invasive species in Africa =

Invasive species found in Africa include:

== Plants ==
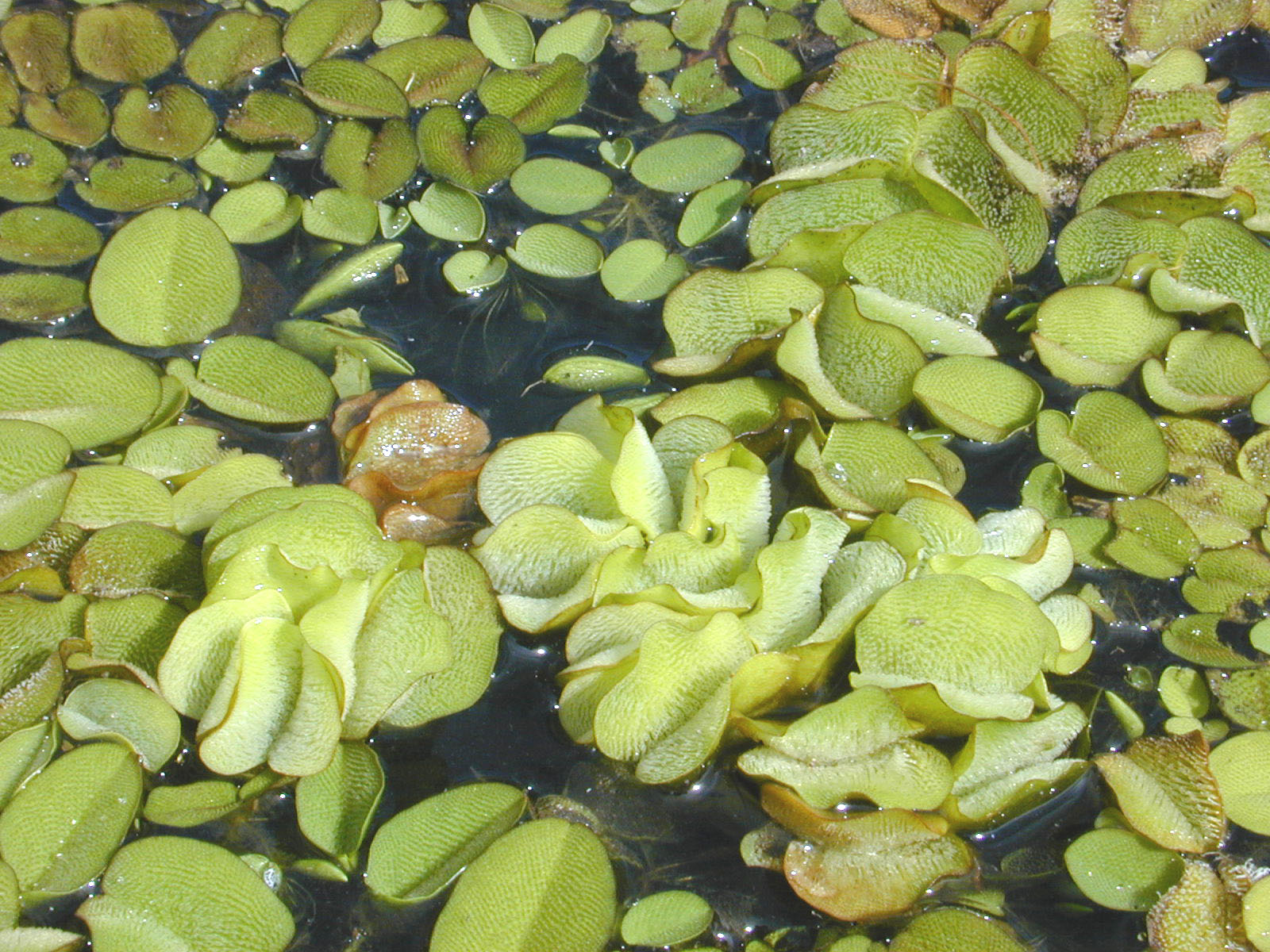
Giant salvinia covers the surface of a pond

- Acacia species (Australian wattles)
- Argemone mexicana (Mexican poppy)
- Caesalpinia decapetala (Mauritius thorn)
- Cereus jamacaru (Queen of the Night cactus)
- Chromolaena odorata (Triffid weed)
- Eichhornia crassipes (Water hyacinth)
- Eucalyptus spp. (Eucalyptus or gum trees)
- Hakea spp.
- Lantana camara
- Melia azedarach (Persian lilac, chinaberry)
- Myriophyllum aquaticum (Parrot's feather)
- Opuntia spp. (Prickly pear)
- Pereskia aculeata
- Pinus spp. (Pine)
- Prosopis spp. (Mesquite)
- Ricinus communis (Castor oil plant)
- Rubus spp. (Bramble)
- Salvinia molesta (Kariba weed, giant salvinia)
- Solanum mauritianum (Bugweed)

== Tunicates ==
- Ciona intestinalis (sea vase)

== Annelids ==
- Ficopomatus enigmaticus (Australian tubeworm)
- Boccardia proboscidea (shell worm)

== Molluscs ==
- Stenophysa marmorata (marbled tadpole snail)
- Bradybaena similaris (Asian trampsnail)
- Cochlicella barbara (potbellied helicellid)
- Cornu aspersum (garden snail)
- Deroceras invadens (tramp slug)
- Deroceras laeve (marsh slug)
- Euglandina rosea (rosy wolfsnail)
- Limax flavus (yellow slug)
- Milax gagates (greenhouse slug)
- Mytilus galloprovincialis (Mediterranean mussel)
- Pinctada radiata (Gulf pearl oyster)
- Pseudosuccinea columella (mimic lymnaea)
- Semimytilus algosus (Pacific mussel)
- Tarebia granifera (quilted melania)
- Theba pisana (white garden snail)
- Zonitoides arboreus (quick gloss)

== Crustaceans ==
- Carcinus maenas (European shore crab)
- Cherax quadricarinatus (redclaw crayfish)
- Limnoria quadripunctata (gribble)
- Percnon gibbesi (Sally Lightfoot crab)
- Procambarus clarkii (red swamp crawfish)
- Procambarus virginalis (Marbled crayfish)

== Arachnids ==
- Phalangium opilio

== Insects ==
- Aedes albopictus (Asian tiger mosquito)
- Aleurodicus dispersus (spiralling whitefly)
- Aleurothrixus floccosus (woolly whitefly)
- Aleurotrachelus atratus (palm-infesting whitefly)
- Anopheles stephensi
- Anoplolepis gracilipes (yellow crazy ant)
- Aphis spiraecola (green citrus aphid)
- Aulacaspis yasumatsui (cycad aulacaspis scale)
- Bactrocera cucurbitae (melon fly)
- Bactrocera dorsalis (Oriental fruit fly)
- Bactrocera invadens (Asian fruit fly)
- Bactrocera zonata (peach fruit fly)
- Bemisia tabaci (silverleaf whitefly)
- Cactoblastis cactorum (cactus moth)
- Ceratitis capitata (Mediterranean fruit fly)
- Ceratitis rosa (Natal fruit fly)
- Chionaspis pinifoliae (pine needle scale insect)
- Cinara cupressi (cypress aphid)
- Coptotermes formosanus (Formosan subterranean termite)
- Cosmopolites sordidus (banana root borer)
- Cryptotermes brevis (West Indian drywood termite)
- Ctenarytaina eucalypti (blue gum psyllid)
- Diuraphis noxia (Russian wheat aphid)
- Eulachnus rileyi (pine needle aphid)
- Euwallacea fornicatus (tea shot hole borer)
- Frankliniella occidentalis (western flower thrips)
- Harmonia axyridis (Asian lady beetle)
- Hylastes ater (black pine bark beetle)
- Hylurgus ligniperda (red-haired pine bark beetle)
- Icerya purchasi (cottony cushion scale)
- Linepithema humile (Argentine ant)
- Liriomyza trifolii (American serpentine leafminer)
- Maconellicoccus hirsutus (hibiscus mealybug)
- Orthotomicus erosus (Mediterranean pine engraver)
- Phenacoccus manihoti (cassava mealybug)
- Phenacoccus solenopsis (cotton mealybug)
- Pineus pini (pine woolly aphid)
- Polistes dominula (European paper wasp
- Prostephanus truncatus (larger grain borer)
- Pseudococcus calceolariae (Citrophilus mealybug)
- Sirex noctilio (Sirex woodwasp)
- Spodoptera frugiperda (fall armyworm)
- Technomyrmex albipes (white-footed ant)
- Thaumastocoris peregrinus (bronze bug)
- Trialeurodes ricini (castor bean whitefly)
- Trichomyrmex destructor (destructive trailing ant)
- Vespula germanica (European wasp)
- Wasmannia auropunctata (electric ant)
- Xyleborinus saxesenii (fruit-tree pinhole borer)
- Xyleborus perforans (island pinhole borer)
- Xylosandrus compactus (black twig borer)

== Fish ==
- Ctenopharyngodon idella (grass carp)
- Cyprinus carpio (common carp)
- Gambusia affinis (western mosquitofish)
- Gambusia holbrooki (eastern mosquitofish)
- Hypophthalmichthys molitrix (silver carp)
- Lates niloticus (Nile perch)
- Lepomis macrochirus (bluegill)
- Micropterus dolomieu (smallmouth bass)
- Micropterus floridanus (Florida bass)
- Micropterus punctulatus (spotted bass)
- Micropterus salmoides (largemouth bass)
- Oreochromis niloticus (Nile tilapia)
- Perca fluviatilis (European perch)
- Pterygoplichthys disjunctivus (vermiculated sailfin catfish)
- Salmo salar (Atlantic salmon)
- Tinca tinca (tench)

== Amphibians ==
- Amietophrynus gutturalis (guttural toad)

== Reptiles ==
- Emys orbicularis (European pond turtle)
- Gehyra mutilata (stump-tailed gecko)
- Hemidactylus frenatus (common house gecko)
- Lepidodactylus lugubris (mourning gecko)
- Tarentola mauritanica (Moorish wall gecko)
- Trachemys scripta ssp. elegans (red-eared slider)

== Birds ==
- Acridotheres tristis (common myna)
- Anas platyrhynchos (mallard)
- Columba livia (rock dove)
- Corvus splendens (house crow)
- Fringilla coelebs (common chaffinch)
- Passer domesticus (house sparrow)
- Psittacula krameri (rose-ringed parakeet)
- Quelea quelea (red-billed quelea)
- Sturnus vulgaris (common starling)
- Tyto alba (western barn owl)

== Mammals ==
- Ammotragus lervia (Barbary sheep)
- Canis lupus (feral dog)
- Capra aegagrus (wild goat)
- Dama dama (fallow deer)
- Equus africanus (feral donkey)
- Felis silvestris (feral cat)
- Funambulus palmarum (three-striped palm squirrel)
- Hemitragus jemlahicus (Himalayan tahr)
- Herpestes javanicus (small Asian mongoose)
- Macaca fascicularis (crab-eating macaque)
- Mus musculus (house mouse)
- Myocastor coypus (coypu)
- Oryctolagus cuniculus (European rabbit)
- Ovis orientalis (mouflon)
- Rattus norvegicus (brown rat)
- Rattus rattus (black rat)
- Suncus murinus (Asian house shrew)
- Sus scrofa (wild boar)
