= List of Phenacoccus species =

This is a list of 180 species in Phenacoccus, a genus of mealybugs in the family Pseudococcidae.

== Phenacoccus species ==
- Phenacoccus abditus Borchsenius, 1949^{c g}
- Phenacoccus acericola King, 1902^{c g}
- Phenacoccus aceris (Signoret, 1875)^{c g b} (apple mealybug)
- Phenacoccus affinis Ter-Grigorian, 1963^{c g}
- Phenacoccus alibotush Gavrilov^{g}
- Phenacoccus alienus De Lotto, 1961^{c g}
- Phenacoccus alleni McKenzie, 1964^{c g}
- Phenacoccus alonim Ben-Dov, 1991^{c g}
- Phenacoccus alticola Bazarov, 1967^{c g}
- Phenacoccus americanus King & Cockerell, 1897^{c g}
- Phenacoccus angophorae Williams, 1985^{c g}
- Phenacoccus angustatus Borchsenius, 1949^{c g}
- Phenacoccus arambourgi Balachowsky, 1954^{c g}
- Phenacoccus arctophilus (Wang, 1979)^{c g}
- Phenacoccus artemisiae Ehrhorn, 1900^{c g}
- Phenacoccus arthrophyti Archangelskaya, 1930^{c g}
- Phenacoccus asphodeli Goux, 1942^{c g}
- Phenacoccus asteri Takahashi, 1932^{c g}
- Phenacoccus avenae Borchsenius, 1949^{c g}
- Phenacoccus avetianae Borchsenius, 1949^{c g}
- Phenacoccus azaleae Kuwana, 1914^{c g}
- Phenacoccus baccharidis Williams, 1987^{c g}
- Phenacoccus balachowskyi Savescu, 1984^{c g}
- Phenacoccus balagnus Balachowsky, 1933^{c g}
- Phenacoccus basorae Bodenheimer, 1943^{c g}
- Phenacoccus bazarovi Ben-Dov, 1994^{c g}
- Phenacoccus betae Moghaddam^{g}
- Phenacoccus bicerarius Borchsenius, 1949^{c g}
- Phenacoccus borchsenii (Matesova, 1957)^{c g}
- Phenacoccus brachipodi (Savescu, 1985)^{c g}
- Phenacoccus caillardi (Balachowsky, 1930)^{c g}
- Phenacoccus cajonensis McKenzie, 1967^{c g}
- Phenacoccus capensis Ferris, 1950^{c g}
- Phenacoccus cassiniae Williams, 1985^{c g}
- Phenacoccus celtisifoliae Hollinger, 1917^{c g}
- Phenacoccus cerasi Savescu, 1985^{c g}
- Phenacoccus colemani Ehrhorn, 1906^{c g}
- Phenacoccus convolvuli Savescu, 1985^{c g}
- Phenacoccus cotyledonis De Lotto, 1964^{c g}
- Phenacoccus crassus Granara de Willink, 1983^{c g}
- Phenacoccus cynodontis Borchsenius, 1949^{c g}
- Phenacoccus cyrenaicus Ferris, 1922^{c g}
- Phenacoccus dearnessi King, 1901^{c g}
- Phenacoccus defectus Ferris, 1950^{c g}
- Phenacoccus desertus Bazarov & Nurmamatov^{g}
- Phenacoccus destitutus McKenzie, 1967^{c g}
- Phenacoccus dicoriae McKenzie, 1961^{c g}
- Phenacoccus discadenatus Danzig, 1978^{c g}
- Phenacoccus echeveriae McKenzie, 1960^{c g}
- Phenacoccus ejinensis Tang in Tang & Li, 1988^{c g}
- Phenacoccus eleabius Silvestri, 1915^{c g}
- Phenacoccus elongatus Kanda, 1943^{c g}
- Phenacoccus emansor Williams & Kozarzhevskaya, 1988^{c g}
- Phenacoccus eremicus Ferris, 1950^{c g}
- Phenacoccus eriogoni Ferris, 1918^{c g}
- Phenacoccus eschscholtziae McKenzie, 1961^{c g}
- Phenacoccus eugeniae Takahashi, 1942^{c g}
- Phenacoccus eurotiae Danzig, 1975^{c g}
- Phenacoccus evelinae (Tereznikova, 1968)^{c g}
- Phenacoccus ferulae Borchsenius, 1949^{c g}
- Phenacoccus fici Takahashi, 1940^{c g}
- Phenacoccus formicarum Leonardi, 1908^{c g}
- Phenacoccus franseriae Ferris, 1921^{c g}
- Phenacoccus fraxinus Tang, 1977^{c g}
- Phenacoccus giganteus McKenzie, 1964^{c g}
- Phenacoccus gobicus Danzig, 1987^{c g}
- Phenacoccus gorgasalicus Hadzibejli, 1960^{c g}
- Phenacoccus gossypii Townsend & Cockerell, 1898^{c g}
- Phenacoccus graminicola Leonardi, 1908^{c g}
- Phenacoccus grandicarpus Hollinger, 1917^{c g}
- Phenacoccus gregosus Williams & Granara de Willink, 1992^{c g}
- Phenacoccus gypsophilae Hall, 1927^{c g}
- Phenacoccus hakeae Williams, 1985^{c g}
- Phenacoccus halimiphylli Danzig, 1968^{c g}
- Phenacoccus halli Ezzat, 1962^{c g}
- Phenacoccus hargreavesi (Laing, 1925)^{c g}
- Phenacoccus helianthi (Cockerell, 1893)^{c g}
- Phenacoccus herbaceus Borchsenius, 1962^{c g}
- Phenacoccus herreni Cox & Williams, 1981^{c g}
- Phenacoccus hordei (Reuter, 1904)^{c g}
- Phenacoccus hortonarum Brachman & Kosztarab in Kosztarab, 1996^{c g}
- Phenacoccus hurdi McKenzie, 1964^{c g}
- Phenacoccus hystrix (Baerensprung, 1849)^{c g}
- Phenacoccus incertus (Kiritshenko, 1940)^{c g}
- Phenacoccus incomptus McKenzie, 1964^{c g}
- Phenacoccus indicus (Avasthi & Shafee, 1980)^{c g}
- Phenacoccus infernalis McKenzie, 1962^{c g}
- Phenacoccus insularis Danzig, 1971^{c g}
- Phenacoccus interruptus Green, 1923^{c g}
- Phenacoccus iranica Moghaddam^{g}
- Phenacoccus isadenatus Danzig, 1971^{c g}
- Phenacoccus juniperi Ter-Grigorian, 1964^{c g}
- Phenacoccus kaplini Danzig, 1983^{c g}
- Phenacoccus karaberdi Borchsenius & Ter-Grigorian, 1956^{c g}
- Phenacoccus kareliniae Borchsenius, 1949^{c g}
- Phenacoccus karkasicus Moghaddam^{g}
- Phenacoccus kokandicus Nurmamatov, 1986^{c g}
- Phenacoccus larvalis Borchsenius, 1949^{c g}
- Phenacoccus latipes Green, 1923^{c g}
- Phenacoccus longoi Russo, 1994^{c g}
- Phenacoccus lotearum McKenzie, 1960^{c g}
- Phenacoccus lycii (Ferris, 1919)^{c g}
- Phenacoccus madeirensis Green, 1925^{i c g}
- Phenacoccus manihoti Matile-Ferrero, 1977^{c g}
- Phenacoccus maritimus Danzig, 1971^{c g}
- Phenacoccus matricariae Savescu, 1984^{c g}
- Phenacoccus megaulus McKenzie, 1967^{c g}
- Phenacoccus memorabilis Borchsenius, 1949^{c g}
- Phenacoccus menieri Matile-Ferrero & Balachowsky, 1972^{c g}
- Phenacoccus meridionalis Gómez-Menor Ortega, 1948^{c g}
- Phenacoccus mexicanus (Miller & McKenzie, 1971)^{c g}
- Phenacoccus meymeryani Bodenheimer, 1943^{c g}
- Phenacoccus minimus Tinsley, 1898^{c g}
- Phenacoccus monieri Balachowsky, 1939^{c g}
- Phenacoccus montanus (Hadzibejli, 1959)^{c g}
- Phenacoccus multisetosus McKenzie, 1967^{c g}
- Phenacoccus neohordei Marotta, 1992^{c g}
- Phenacoccus nephelii Takahashi, 1939^{c g}
- Phenacoccus nurmamatovi Bazarov, 1979^{c g}
- Phenacoccus orcinus De Lotto, 1964^{c g}
- Phenacoccus parietariae (Lichtenstein, 1881)^{c g}
- Phenacoccus parietaricola Goux, 1938^{c g}
- Phenacoccus parvus Morrison, 1924^{i c g}
- Phenacoccus pauculus De Lotto, 1964^{c g}
- Phenacoccus pauperatus Ferris, 1950^{c g}
- Phenacoccus pergandei Cockerell, 1896^{c g}
- Phenacoccus perillustris Borchsenius, 1949^{c g}
- Phenacoccus persimplex Borchsenius, 1949^{c g}
- Phenacoccus peruvianus Granara de Willink, 2007^{g}
- Phenacoccus phenacoccoides (Kiritshenko, 1932)^{g}
- Phenacoccus piceae (Löw, 1883)^{c g}
- Phenacoccus poriferus Borchsenius, 1949^{c g}
- Phenacoccus pratti Takahashi, 1951^{c g}
- Phenacoccus prodigialis Ferris, 1950^{c g}
- Phenacoccus prosopidis Bodenheimer, 1943^{c g}
- Phenacoccus proximus De Lotto, 1974^{c g}
- Phenacoccus prunispinosi Savescu, 1984^{c g}
- Phenacoccus pseudopumilus Hadzibejli, 1960^{c g}
- Phenacoccus psidiarum Cockerell, 1903^{c g}
- Phenacoccus pumilus Kiritshenko, 1936^{c g}
- Phenacoccus pyramidensis Ezzat, 1960^{c g}
- Phenacoccus quadricaudata (Signoret, 1875)^{c g}
- Phenacoccus querculus (Borchsenius, 1949)^{c g}
- Phenacoccus radii Bodenheimer, 1943^{c g}
- Phenacoccus rehaceki Savescu, 1984^{c g}
- Phenacoccus rotundus Kanda, 1943^{c g}
- Phenacoccus rubivorus Cockerell, 1901^{c g}
- Phenacoccus sakai (Takahashi, 1951)^{c g}
- Phenacoccus salsolae Danzig, 1975^{c g}
- Phenacoccus salviacus Moghaddam^{g}
- Phenacoccus schmelevi Bazarov, 1980^{c g}
- Phenacoccus segnis (Brain, 1915)^{c g}
- Phenacoccus setiger Borchsenius, 1949^{c g}
- Phenacoccus sherbinovskyi Bodenheimer, 1943^{c g}
- Phenacoccus shutovae Danzig, 1971^{c g}
- Phenacoccus silvanae Longo & Russo in Longo et al., 1989^{c g}
- Phenacoccus similis Granara de Willink, 1983^{c g}
- Phenacoccus sogdianicus Nurmamatov & Bazarov, 1987^{c g}
- Phenacoccus solani Ferris, 1918^{i c g b} (solanum mealybug)
- Phenacoccus solenopsis Tinsley, 1898^{c g}
- Phenacoccus specificus Matesova, 1960^{c g}
- Phenacoccus sphaeralceae Williams, 1987^{c g}
- Phenacoccus sphagni (Green, 1915)^{c g}
- Phenacoccus stelli (Brain, 1915)^{c g}
- Phenacoccus stipae Nurmamatov, 1986^{c g}
- Phenacoccus strigosus Borchsenius, 1949^{c g}
- Phenacoccus subdeserticus Vayssière, 1932^{c g}
- Phenacoccus surinamensis ^{i}
- Phenacoccus tataricus Matesova, 1960^{c g}
- Phenacoccus tergrigorianae Borchsenius in Borchsenius & Ter-Grigorian, 1956^{c g}
- Phenacoccus tibialis Borchsenius, 1949^{c g}
- Phenacoccus transcaucasicus Hadzibejli, 1960^{c g}
- Phenacoccus transvcaucasicus Hadzibejli, 1960^{g}
- Phenacoccus trichonotus (Danzig, 1971)^{c g}
- Phenacoccus tucumanus Granara de Willink, 1983^{c g}
- Phenacoccus ulmi (Savescu, 1985)^{c g}
- Phenacoccus vaccinii (Danzig, 1960)^{c g}
- Phenacoccus viburnae Kanda, 1931^{c g}
- Phenacoccus wilmattae Cockerell, 1901^{c g}
- Phenacoccus yerushalmi Ben-Dov, 1985^{c g}

Data sources: i = ITIS, c = Catalogue of Life, g = GBIF, b = Bugguide.net
