= Keuphylia =

Scientific classification
- Kingdom: Animalia
- Phylum: Arthropoda
- Clade: Pancrustacea
- Class: Malacostraca
- Order: Isopoda
- Suborder: Limnoriidea
- Superfamily: Limnorioidea
- Family: Keuphyliidae
- Genus: Keuphylia; Bruce, 1980
- Species: K. nodosa

Binomial name
- Keuphylia nodosa Bruce, 1980

Genus of crustaceans

Keuphylia nodosa is a species of isopod crustacean closely related to gribbles. It is the only member of the genus Keyphylia and the family Keuphyliidae.

== Etymology ==
The name Keyphylia comes from the combination of the Ancient Greek words κεύθω (keúthō), meaning to hide, and φιλία (phĭ́los), meaning affection, alluding to the cryptic habitat this species lives in. The specific epithet is the Latin word nodosa, referring to the lumpy (or nodulose) body surface.

== Distribution and ecology ==
Keyphylia nodosa has only known from the Coral Sea, where it has been found in the Chesterfield Reefs (on Mellish Reef, Long Island and North Cay) and Marion Reefs (on Brodie Cay). It occurs in shallow waters on exposed reef slopes to a depth of 20 m (66 ft) and in lagoons to 6 m (20 ft). In high energy reef slope environments it has been found behind in crevices behind well-developed algae ridges experiencing the full force of the ocean crashing into the reef, where it co-occurs with a very flattened seapill. In sheltered lagoon environments, it has been found with the cowries Ipsa childreni and Pustularia cicercula, which prefer quieter water conditions. It is theorized that Keuphylia nodosa has a similar ecology to the seapill-relative Plakarthrium, although the lack of strong legs might indicate a preference for more sheltered environments.
