= P. globulus =

P. globulus may refer to:

- Pustularia globulus, a cowry, a sea snail species occurring in the Red Sea and Indian Ocean
- Podocarpus globulus, a conifer species found in Indonesia and Malaysia

== See also ==
- Globulus (disambiguation)
