= Paralimnoria =

Scientific classification
- Kingdom: Animalia
- Phylum: Arthropoda
- Clade: Pancrustacea
- Class: Malacostraca
- Order: Isopoda
- Suborder: Limnoriidea
- Genus: Paralimnoria; Menzies, 1957

Type species
- Limnoria andrewsi Calman, 1910

Species
- P. andrewsi (Calman, 1910); P. asterosa Cookson & Cragg, 1988

Genus of crustaceans

Paralimnoria is a genus of gribbles closely related to the genus Limnoria. Unlike that genus it only occurs in tropical regions.

== Distribution ==
The genus occurs across the central and eastern Indo-Pacific, occurring in the Cocos-Keeling Islands, Christmas Island, Philippines, Japan, Papua New Guinea, as well as the Caribbean and other parts of the tropical Atlantic, such as Florida, Puerto Rico and Ghana. They occur in very shallow waters, from the surface to 8 m (26 ft).

== Species ==
The genus Paralimnoria includes the following species:

- Paralimnoria andrewsi (Calman, 1910)
- Paralimnoria asterosa Cookson & Cragg, 1988
