= Hadromastax polynesica =

Scientific classification
- Kingdom: Animalia
- Phylum: Arthropoda
- Clade: Pancrustacea
- Class: Malacostraca
- Order: Isopoda
- Family: Hadromastacidae
- Genus: Hadromastax
- Species: H. polynesica

Binomial name
- Hadromastax polynesica Bruce & Müller, 1991

Species of isopods

Hadromastax polynesica is a species of isopod crustacean related to gribbles. It is known from shallow waters in French Polynesia.

== Description ==
Hadromastax polynesica is a very small isopod, measuring about 1.9–2.4 mm (0.075–0.094 in) long. Like other members of the genus, the body is very broad and depressed, with all coxal plates free from the dorsal pereon segments, including most notably segment 1. Sexual dimorphism is externally minor, with females usually being slightly larger than the males, although the mouthparts of the male are reduced compared to those of the female. The pleon has a pair of sharp-tipped dorsal lobes, with a U-shaped valley situated between them. The telson is domed dorsally, and the uropods are large, with the exopod sitting on the lateral margin of the "stalk" far basally of the endopod. The male appendix masculina (approximately equivalent to a penis) is extremely elongate, far surpassing the rest of the pleopod is it on, appearing very slender and whip-like.

Compared to the other two species in the genus, Hadromastax polynesica can be easiest distinguished from Hadromastax merga by having much sharper dorsal lobes on the pleon, pereon segment 1 much shorter (only a third as long as pereon segment 2 compared to half as long in H. merga), a broad-rounded telson tip and the much larger coxal plates on pereon segments 3–5. It is much more similar to Hadromastax dinamoraze, which it can be distinguished by the less elongate body, telson with a central ridge in males, a weakly setose dorsal surface, the fifth coxal plate extending to the pleon, and in the more close-set dorsal lobes on the pleon, as well as some minor details on the appendages.

== Distribution and ecology ==
Hadromastax polynesica is currently only known from the islands of Bora Bora and Moorea in the Society Islands. It is known from dead coral skeletons in very shallow water ranging from 0.5–2 m (1 ft 8 in – 6 ft 7 in) deep.
