= Pustularia =

Pustularia is the scientific name of two genera of organisms and may refer to:

- Pustularia (fungus), a genus of ascomycete fungi
- Pustularia (gastropod), a genus of sea snails in the family Cypraeidae
