= Hadromastax dinamoraze =

Scientific classification
- Kingdom: Animalia
- Phylum: Arthropoda
- Clade: Pancrustacea
- Class: Malacostraca
- Order: Isopoda
- Family: Hadromastacidae
- Genus: Hadromastax
- Species: H. dinamoraze

Binomial name
- Hadromastax dinamoraze Bruce, 2004

Species of isopods

Hadromastax dinamoraze is a species of isopod crustacean related to gribbles. It is known from shallow waters on Rodrigues.

== Description ==
Like other members of the genus, the body is very broad and depressed, with all coxal plates free from the dorsal pereon segments, including most notably segment 1. The pleon has 2 segments, each with a pair of large point-tipped dorsal lobes. The telson has a flat or truncate apex. The juveniles and females have enormous conical mandibles with dark-colored sclerotized incisors. The mature males lose these enormous mouthparts, with the mandibles being much smaller and unsclerotised. Like in H. polynesica, the male appendix masculina (functionally similar to a penis) is very long and slender.

Out of the two other species in the genus, Hadromastax dinamorazae is most similar to H. polynesica, which it differs from by the more elongate body, the telson of the males lacking a central ridge, the dorsal surface being densely hairy, the coxal plate of pereon segment 5 not approaching the pleon, the dorsal pleon lobes being set further apart, and in minor details on the appendages. It is much more noticeably different from the species H. merga, which it differs from by the non-serrate margins of the pereon coxal plates, the rounded telson tip and the pointed apexes of the pleon dorsal lobes.

== Distribution and ecology ==
Hadromastax dinamoraze is known from the island of Rodriques in the Mascarene Islands. It is known from dead corals and the coralline algae Porolithon from the intertidal zone on reef crests and 17–18 m (56–59 ft) below sea level on reef slopes.
