= IPSA =

IPSA or Ipsa may refer to:

== Organizations ==
- I. P. Sharp Associates, a Canadian company, creator of the IPSANET computer network
- Independent Parliamentary Standards Authority, a public body in the United Kingdom
- Institut polytechnique des sciences avancées, a French private aerospace engineering grande école
- International Political Science Association, a UNESCO scholarly association
- International Professional Surrogates Association, a non-profit organization dedicated to advancing sexual surrogate therapy
- International Professional Security Association, a membership association for individuals and companies working in the fire and security sector to ensure professionalism in the management of security operations

== Publications ==
- International Political Science Abstracts, an academic journal, published on behalf of the International Political Science Association

== People ==
- Kristijan Ipša (born 1986), Croatian footballer of Slovenian heritage

== Other uses ==
- Ipsa, a genus of sea snails
- Índice de Precio Selectivo de Acciones, a Chilean Stock Index
- Intimate partner sexual assault, a variant term for spousal rape

== See also ==
- International Public Sector Accounting Standards (IPSAS), a set of accounting standards
