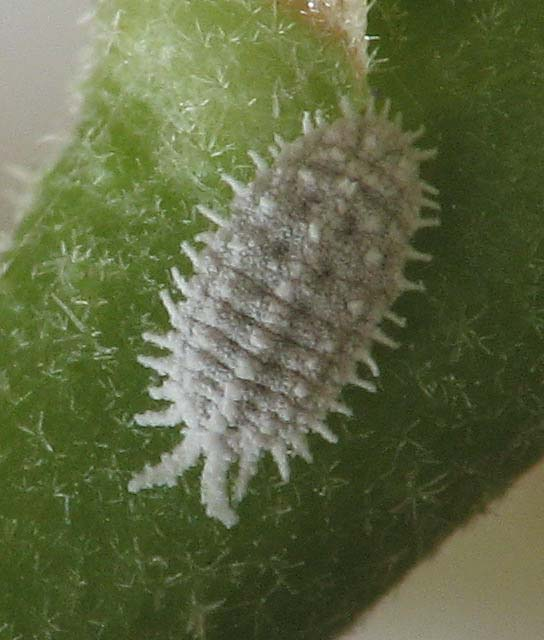
- Phenacoccus solani

Scientific classification
- Kingdom: Animalia
- Phylum: Arthropoda
- Class: Insecta
- Order: Hemiptera
- Suborder: Sternorrhyncha
- Family: Pseudococcidae
- Genus: Phenacoccus; Cockerell, 1902

Diversity
- at least 180 species

= Phenacoccus =

Genus of true bugs

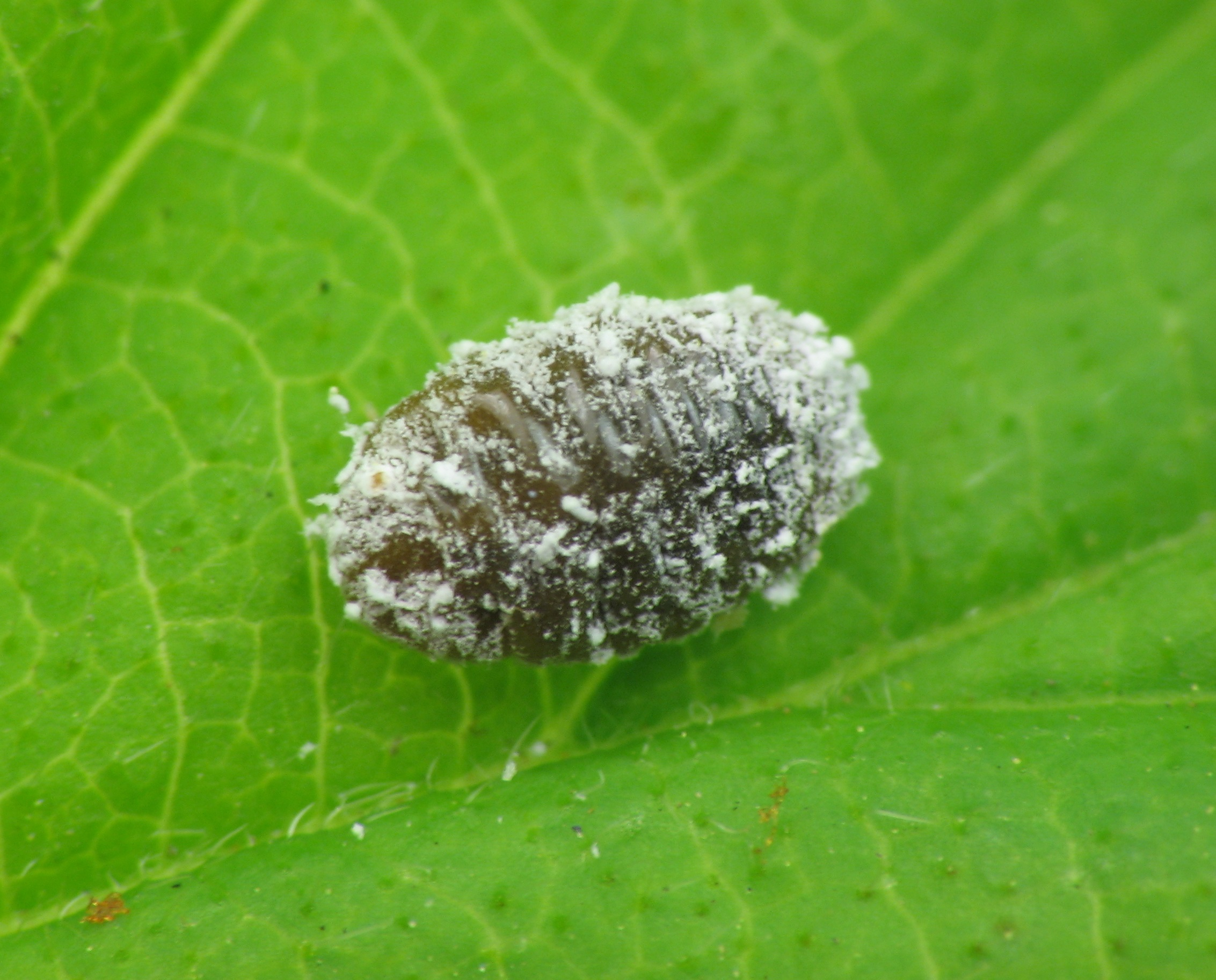
Phenacoccus aceris

Phenacoccus is a genus of mealybugs in the family Pseudococcidae. There are at least 180 described species in Phenacoccus.

== Selected species ==
- Phenacoccus aceris (Signoret, 1875) (apple mealybug)
- Phenacoccus betae Moghaddam, 2010
- Phenacoccus manihoti Matile-Ferrero, 1977
- Phenacoccus solani Ferris, 1918 (solanum mealybug)
- Phenacoccus solenopsis Tinsley, 1898

See: List of Phenacoccus species

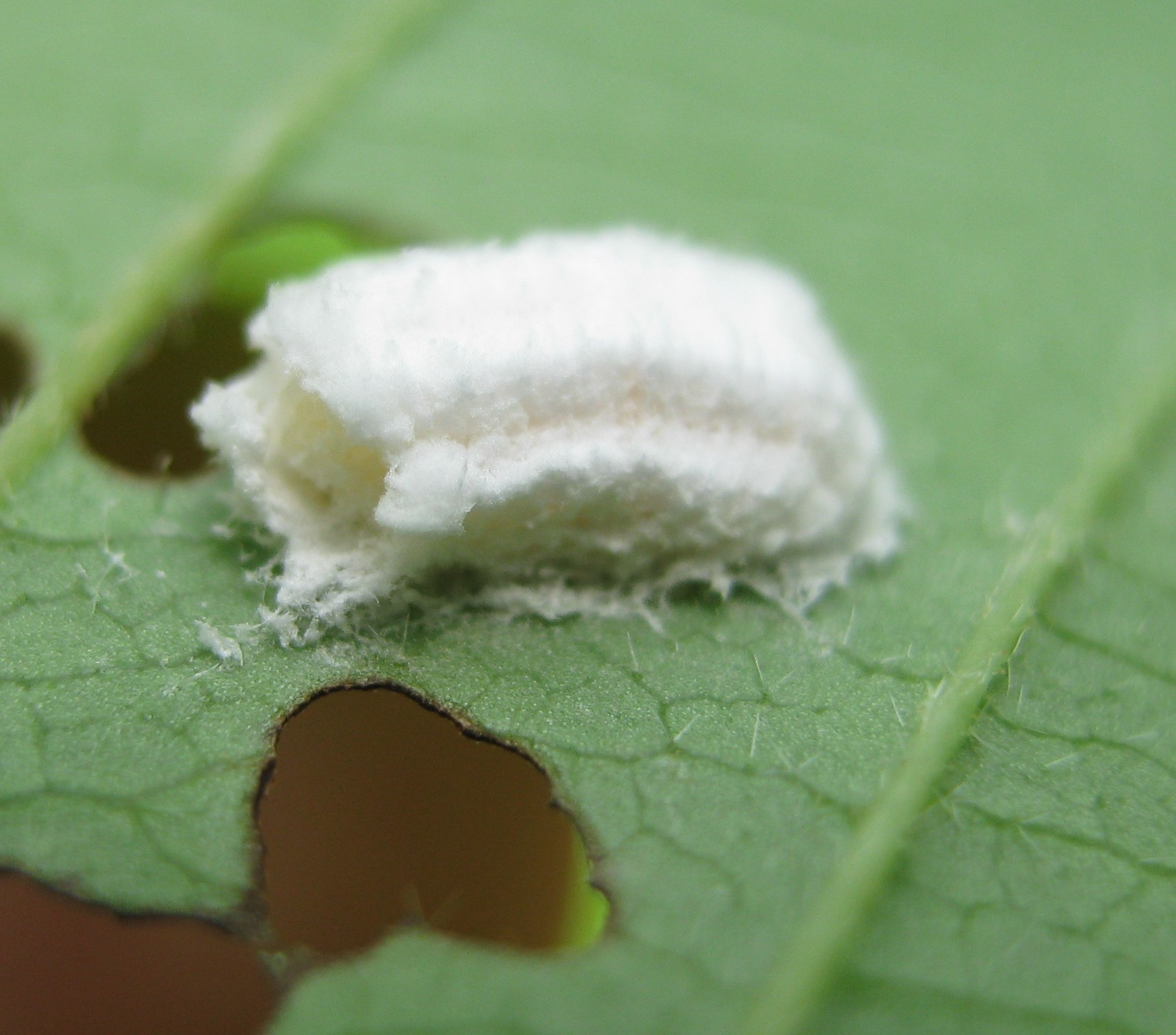
Phenacoccus aceris egg case
