= Pustularia chiapponii =

Scientific classification
- Kingdom: Animalia
- Phylum: Mollusca
- Class: Gastropoda
- Subclass: Caenogastropoda
- Order: Littorinimorpha
- Family: Cypraeidae
- Genus: Pustularia
- Species: P. chiapponii

Binomial name
- Pustularia chiapponii Lorenz, 1999

Species of gastropod

Pustularia chiapponii is a species of sea snail, a cowry, a marine gastropod mollusc in the family Cypraeidae, the cowries.
