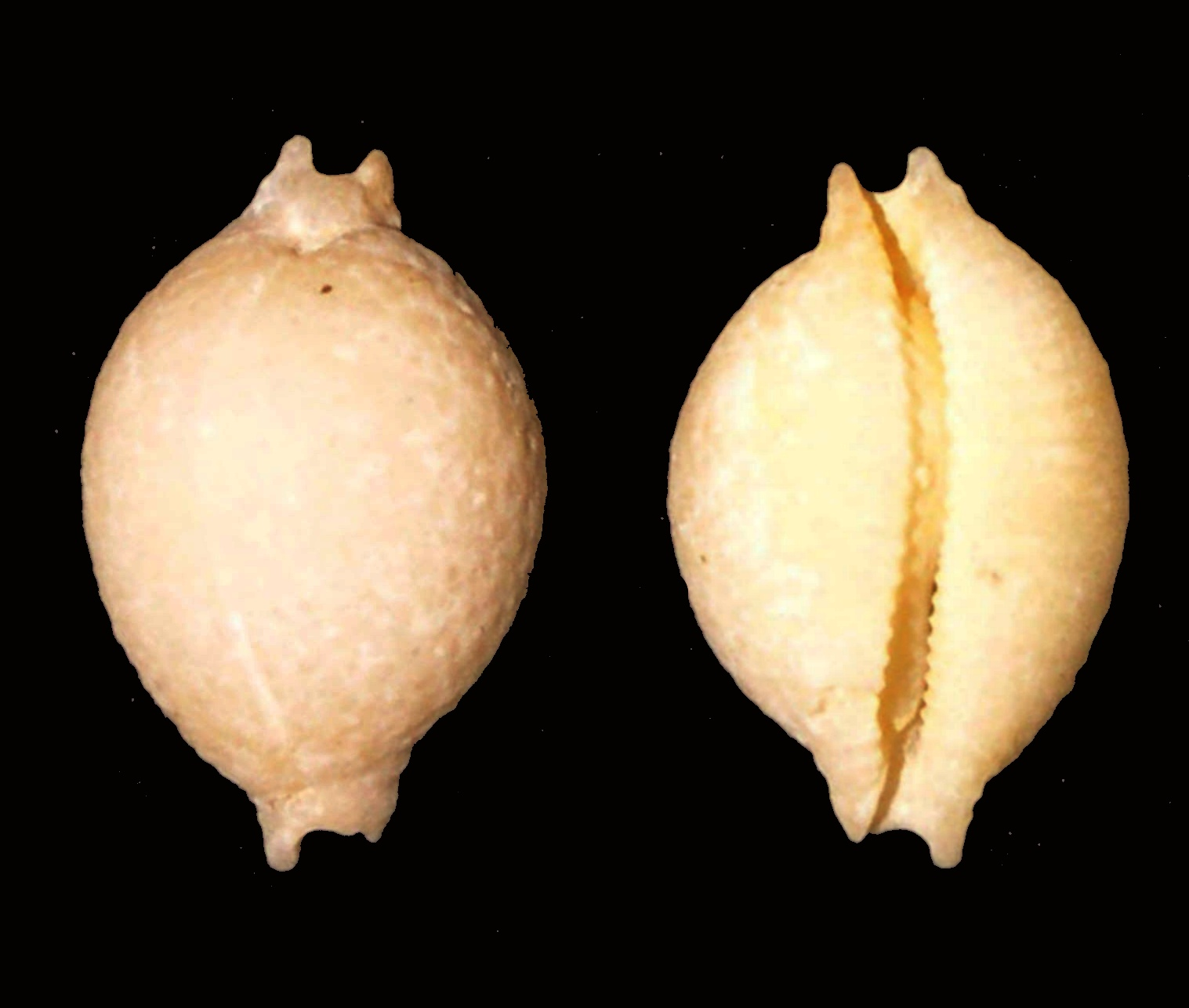
- Two views of a shell of Pustularia cicercula

Scientific classification
- Kingdom: Animalia
- Phylum: Mollusca
- Class: Gastropoda
- Subclass: Caenogastropoda
- Order: Littorinimorpha
- Superfamily: Cypraeoidea
- Family: Cypraeidae
- Genus: Pustularia; Swainson, 1840

Type species
- Cypraea cicercula Linnaeus, 1758

Synonyms
- Cypraea (Epona) H. Adams & A. Adams, 1854; Cypraea (Pustularia) Swainson, 1840 (superseded combination); Epona Adams & Adams, 1854; Pustularia (Pustularia) Swainson, 1840; Trivia (Epona) H. Adams & A. Adams, 1854 (original rank); Trivia (Pustularia) Swainson, 1840

= Pustularia (gastropod) =

Genus of gastropods

Pustularia is a small genus of medium-sized sea snails or cowries, marine gastropod molluscs in the subfamily Pustulariinae of the family Cypraeidae, the cowries.

== Distribution ==
These cowries are found along the coast of East Africa, Australia, Hawaii, the Philippines, the Red Sea and in the Indo-Pacific region in general.

== Species ==
Species within the genus Pustularia include:

- Pustularia bistrinotata Schilder & Schilder, 1937
- Pustularia chiapponii Lorenz, 1999
- Pustularia cicercula (Linnaeus, 1758)
- Pustularia globulus (Linnaeus, 1758)
- Pustularia keelingensis Schilder, F.A. & M. Schilder, 1940
- Pustularia jandeprezi Poppe & Martin, 1997 (synonym : Pustularia jandeprezi)
- † Pustularia korneli Fehse & Vicián, 2021
- † Pustularia lodanensis (F. A. Schilder, 1937)
- Pustularia marerubra Lorenz, 2009
- Pustularia margarita (Dillwyn, 1817) : Pearl cowry
  - Pustularia margarita africana Lorenz, F. Jr. & A. Hubert, 1993
  - Pustularia margarita tuamotensis Lorenz, F. Jr. & A. Hubert, 1993
- Pustularia mauiensis (Burgess, 1967) Maui chick-pea cowry (endemic to Hawaii)

Species brought into synonymy

- Pustularia childreni (Gray, 1825): synonym of Ipsa childreni (Gray, 1825)
- Pustularia mariae Schilder, 1927 accepted as Annepona mariae (Schilder, 1927) (original combination)
- Pustularia maricola C. N. Cate, 1976 accepted as Nesiocypraea lisetae maricola (C. N. Cate, 1976) (original combination)
- † Pustularia pisiformis F. A. Schilder, 1932 accepted as † Ficadusta pisiformis (F. A. Schilder, 1932) (original combination)
- † Pustularia rugifera Schilder, 1927 accepted as † Maestratia rugifera (Schilder, 1927) (original combination)
- Pustularia tricornis (Jousseaume, 1874) accepted as Pustularia cicercula tricornis (Jousseaume, 1874)
- Pustularia tuamotensis Lorenz & Huber, 1993: synonym of Pustularia margarita var. tuamotensis Lorenz & Huber, 1993 accepted as Pustularia margarita (Dillwyn, 1817)
- Pustularia wattsi Lorenz, 2000 accepted as Pustularia mauiensis wattsi Lorenz, 2000
