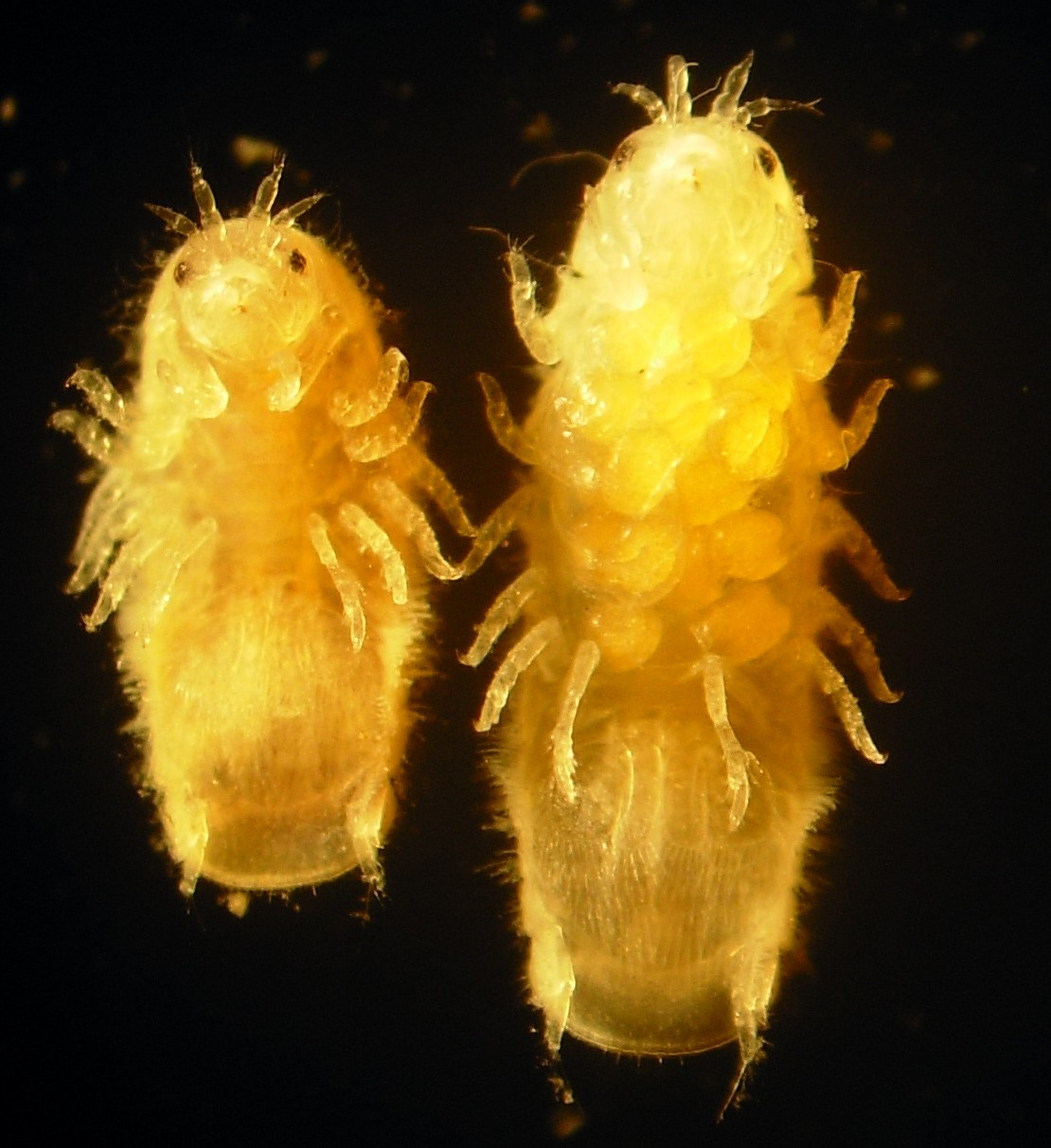
- Limnoria quadripunctata

Scientific classification
- Kingdom: Animalia
- Phylum: Arthropoda
- Clade: Pancrustacea
- Class: Malacostraca
- Order: Isopoda
- Suborder: Limnoriidea; Brandt & Poore in Poore, 2002

Families
- Hadromastacidae; Keuphyliidae; Limnoriidae

= Limnoriidea =

Suborder of crustaceans

The Limnoriidea are a suborder of marine isopod crustaceans.

== Families ==
The suborder contains three families in a single superfamily:

- Superfamily Limnorioidea White, 1850
  - Family Hadromastacidae Bruce & Müller, 1991
  - Family Keuphyliidae Bruce, 1980
  - Family Limnoriidae White, 1850
