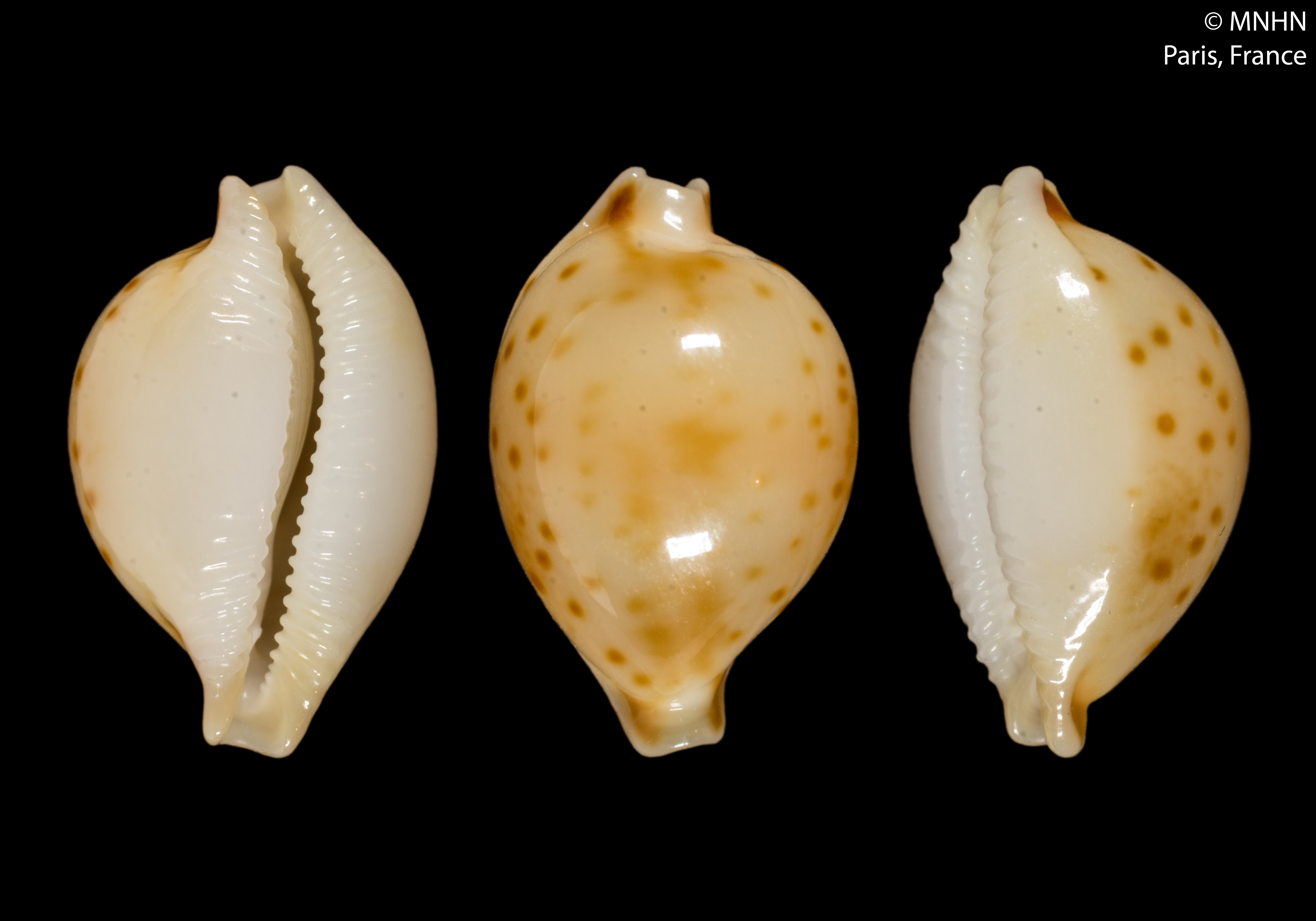
- Shell of Pustularia mauiensis wattsi (holotype aty MNHN, Paris)

Scientific classification
- Kingdom: Animalia
- Phylum: Mollusca
- Class: Gastropoda
- Subclass: Caenogastropoda
- Order: Littorinimorpha
- Family: Cypraeidae
- Genus: Pustularia
- Species: P. mauiensis

Binomial name
- Pustularia mauiensis Burgess, 1967

Synonyms
- Cypraea mauiensis Burgess, 1967 (original combination)

= Pustularia mauiensis =

Species of gastropod

Pustularia mauiensis, commonly known as Maui chickpea cowry or Maui's cowry, is a rare species of small sea snail, a cowry, a marine gastropod mollusc in the family Cypraeidae, the cowries.

== Subspecies ==
- Pustularia mauiensis mauiensis (Burgess, 1967)
- Pustularia mauiensis wattsi Lorenz, 2000- occurs off Hawaii.

== Description ==
The length of the shell attains 11.6 mm. It is a grazer on algae.

== Distribution ==
Like its subspecies, Pustularia mauinesis occurs off Hawaii.
