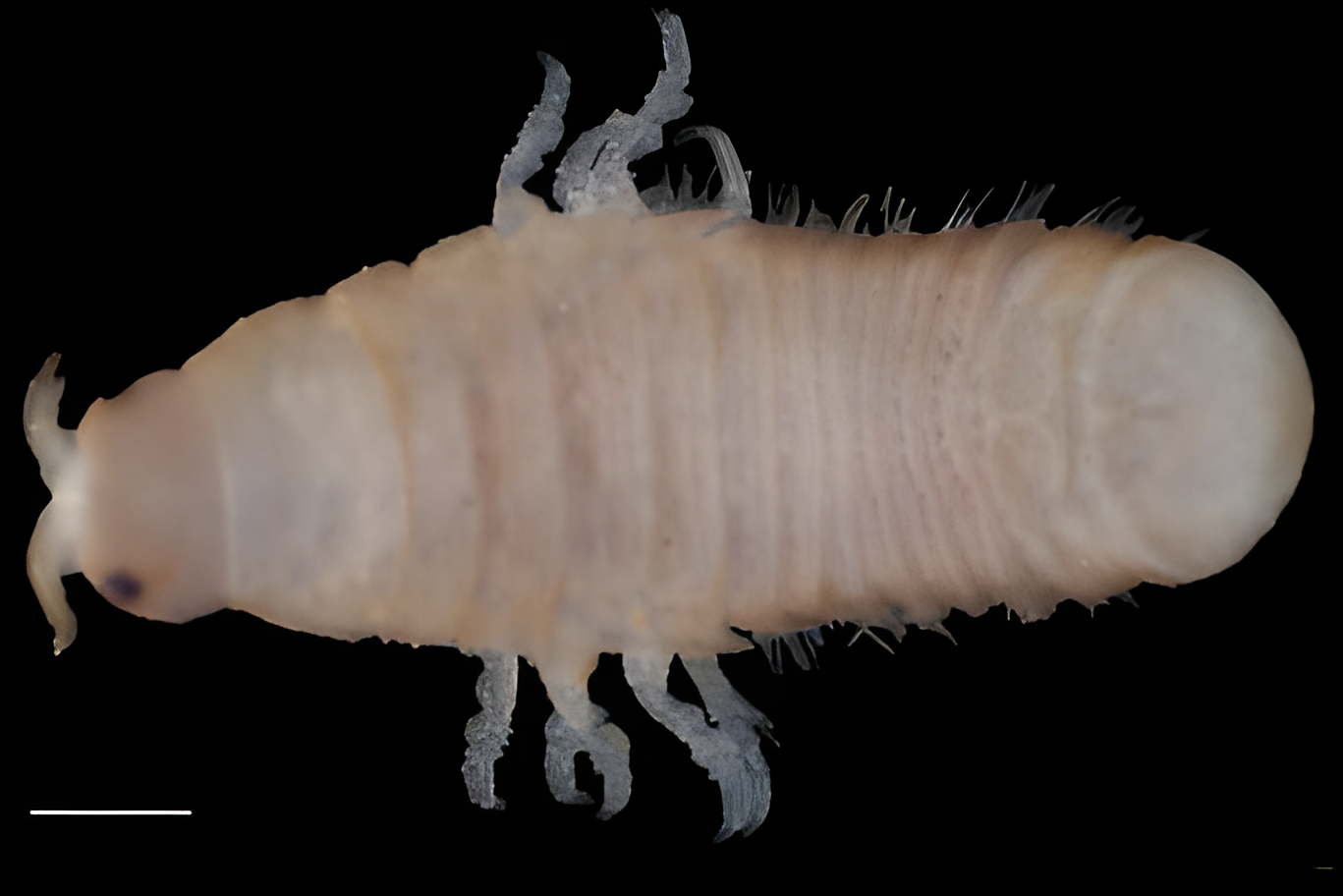

Scientific classification
- Kingdom: Animalia
- Phylum: Arthropoda
- Clade: Pancrustacea
- Class: Malacostraca
- Order: Isopoda
- Family: Limnoriidae
- Genus: Limnoria
- Species: L. lignorum

Binomial name
- Limnoria lignorum (Rathke, 1799)

Synonyms
- Cymothoa lignora Rathke, 1799; Cymothoa lignorum Rathke, 1799; Limnoria terebrans Leach, 1815

= Limnoria lignorum =

Species of crustacean

Limnoria lignorum, commonly known as the gribble, is a species of isopod in the family Limnoriidae. It is found in shallow water in the North Atlantic and North Pacific Ocean where it tunnels into wood and attacks and destroys submerged wooden structures.

== Description ==
Limnoria lignorum grows to a maximum length of 5.6 mm (0.22 in) but a more usual size range is 1 to 4 mm (0.04 to 0.16 in). It is a yellowish colour and is about three times as long as it is broad. It has a woodlouse-like body with fourteen segments. It bores its way into wood to a depth of about 12 mm (0.5 in).

== Distribution ==
Limnoria lignorum is found in the boreal and temperate seas of the northern Atlantic Ocean and North Sea and it is also known from the west coast of North America. Its range extends from Norway southwards to France, and from the Gulf of St Lawrence southwards to Cobscook Bay and Cape Cod. Its depth range is from the littoral zone to a depth of about 20 m (66 ft) It is unclear from exactly where it originated because it has spread widely, aided in its dispersal by tunnelling into the hulls of wooden ships and inside floating driftwood. It was first described by the German zoologist Martin Rathke in 1799 from a location is Norway.

== Biology ==
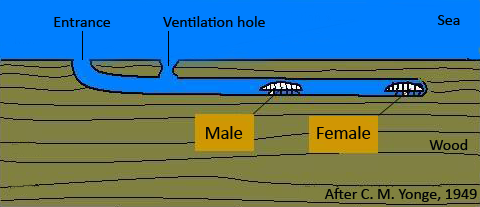
Gribbles tunnelling

Limnoria lignorum is a wood borer and in favourable conditions can be present in large numbers, with densities of as many as four hundred individuals per 1 in^{3} (16.4 cm^{3}) of wood. The isopods are very small and the damage is at first confined to near the surface of the wood. The tunnels are about 1 mm (0.04 in) in diameter and usually follow the line of less-lignified material. As the upper layer of wood crumbles away under this onslaught, deeper parts of the timber are attacked and in time, pilings and other wooden structures are eaten away.

Limnoria lignorum ingest wood fragments as they burrow. They do not seem to house bacteria in their gut that are able to digest lignin, as is the case in some other wood-boring species, and seem to rely on their cellulolytic enzymes to digest cellulose. They may also feed on fungal hyphae directly or may consume them indirectly in wood that is already softened as a result of attack by fungi and bacteria. The enzymes it produces to break up wood into sugars which it can digest are being investigated for producing biofuel.

The eggs of Limnoria lignorum are retained by the female in the brood pouch under her thorax. The eggs hatch directly into mancae, juveniles that are miniature versions of the adult, which means there is no free-living larval stage to aid dispersal of this species. It has been shown that the water temperature influences reproductive processes. Little tunnelling or reproduction takes place during the winter but activity starts earlier in the year and continues later, and the young develop more rapidly under the warmer conditions that exist near the exit of a water cooling system.

== Effect on piers ==
It has been known to damage wooden piles in piers, something first observed in 1810 by Robert Stevenson in the timbers he used in constructing the Bell Rock Lighthouse. In 1830 the Trinity Chain Pier had to be almost completely rebuilt after attack from the organism. The use of creosote does not protect wood against it.
