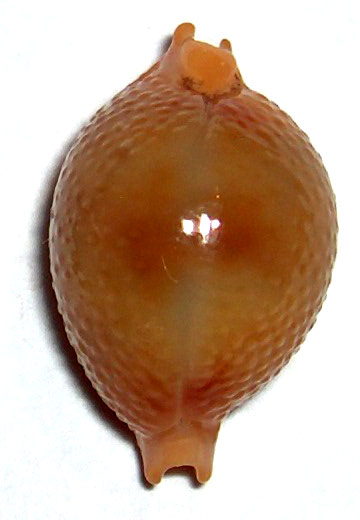

Scientific classification
- Kingdom: Animalia
- Phylum: Mollusca
- Class: Gastropoda
- Subclass: Caenogastropoda
- Order: Littorinimorpha
- Family: Cypraeidae
- Genus: Pustularia
- Species: P. bistrinotata

Binomial name
- Pustularia bistrinotata Schilder & Schilder, 1937

Synonyms
- Cypraea bistrinotata Schilder & Schilder, 1937

= Pustularia bistrinotata =

Species of gastropod

Pustularia bistrinotata is a species of sea snail, a cowry, a marine gastropod mollusc in the family Cypraeidae, the cowries.

== Subspecies ==
- Pustularia bistrinotata bistrinotata Schilder, F.A. & M. Schilder, 1937 Twice-triple-spotted cowry
- Pustularia bistrinotata excelsior F. Lorenz, 2014
- Pustularia bistrinotata ginoi F. Lorenz, 2014
- Pustularia bistrinotata jandeprezi Poppe, G.T. & P. Martin, 1997
- Pustularia keelingensis Schilder, F.A. & M. Schilder, 1940
- Pustularia bistrinotata mediocris Schilder, F.A. & M. Schilder, 1938 Mediocre bistrinotata
- Pustularia bistrinotata sublaevis Schilder, F.A. & M. Schilder, 1938 Almost smooth bistrinotata

== Description ==
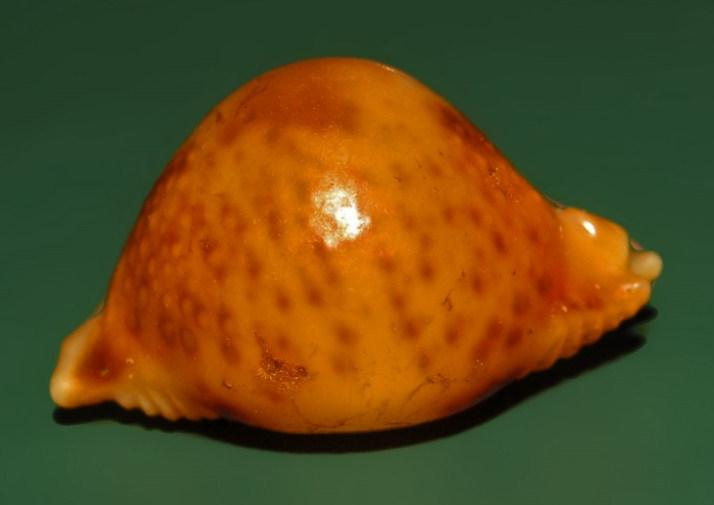
Pustularia bistrinotata, side view

This small species rarely exceed 20 millimetres (0.79 in) of length. The shape is globular and the basic color is reddish, with darker small spots.

== Distribution ==
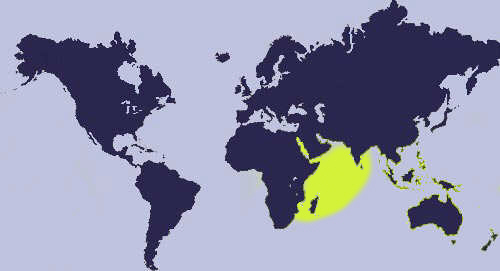
Distribution map of Pustularia bistrinotata

This species is distributed in the seas along Aldabra, Chagos, Kenya, the Mascarene Basin, Mauritius, the Red Sea, Réunion, the Seychelles and Tanzania.
