= Hadromastax =

Scientific classification
- Kingdom: Animalia
- Phylum: Arthropoda
- Clade: Pancrustacea
- Class: Malacostraca
- Order: Isopoda
- Suborder: Limnoriidea
- Family: Hadromastacidae; Bruce & Müller, 1991
- Genus: Hadromastax; Bruce, 1988

Type species
- Hadromastax merga Bruce, 1988

Species
- H. dinamoraze Bruce, 2004; H. merga Bruce, 1988; H. polynesica Bruce & Müller, 1991

Genus of isopods

Hadromastax is a genus of marine isopod crustaceans. It is the only member of the family Hadromastacidae.

== Description ==
Hadromastax is a small isopod, about 1–2 mm (0.039–0.079 in) long. The most distinctive features are the unfused coxal plates on pereon segment 1 and the uropod exopod set separately and basally to the endopod. The pleon is 2-segmented with 2 large dorsal lobes. The female has enormous conical jaws with conspicous sclerotized incisors, which gave the genus its name, derived from the Greek words ἁδρός (hădrós) and μάσταξ (mástax), meaning strong-jaws. These jaws are also present in juveniles, manca and even young still still in the marsupial pouch, where the large dark-colored incisors are visible through the pouch lining. The mature males loose these jaws upon maturity, being replaced by much smaller and simpler jaws, in an instance of sexual dimorphism.

== Distribution and ecology ==
Members of Hadromastax are known in coral rubble in the intertidal zone and shallow water in regions of the Indo-Pacific (the Society Islands and Rodrigues) as well as deeper environments off of New South Wales.

== Taxonomy ==
The genus Hadromastax includes three species:

- Hadromastax dinamoraze Bruce, 2004
- Hadromastax merga Bruce, 1988
- Hadromastax polynesica Bruce & Müller, 1991
