= Hadromastax merga =

Scientific classification
- Kingdom: Animalia
- Phylum: Arthropoda
- Clade: Pancrustacea
- Class: Malacostraca
- Order: Isopoda
- Family: Hadromastacidae
- Genus: Hadromastax
- Species: H. merga

Binomial name
- Hadromastax merga Bruce, 1988

Species of isopods

Hadromastax merga is a species of isopod related to gribbles. It is known from moderately deep waters in New South Wales.

== Description and taxonomy ==
Hadromastax merga only known from a single adult female, which is 2.5 mm (0.098 in) long. Like other members of the genus, the body is very broad and depressed, with all coxal plates free from the dorsal pereon segments, including most notably segment 1. Unlike other members of the genus, some of these coxal plates have serrate margins. The dorsal surface is covered in small fine-tipped bumps, a trait also unknown from other members of the genus. The pleon has two large blunt-tipped dorsal lobes, and the telson has a flat or truncate border to the apex. The mandibles are enormous on the only known specimen, with a huge dark-colored sclerotized tip, although this is now known to be a trait only occurring in females in the family. The uropods are unusual compared to related isopods (although similar to other members of the genus), with the exopod set far basally of the endopod and set on a different joint.

Hadromastax merga was given its own genus (Hadromastax) upon description due to its unique traits and was originally placed in the family Limnoriidae with the much more familiar Gribbles. It was moved to its own family a few years later due to its strange appearance and a multitude of traits that made it distinct from Limnoriidae. It is still placed closed to Limnoriidae in the same small suborder, Limnoriidea.

== Distribution and ecology ==
Hadromastax merga has only been collected once off the coast of Newcastle, New South Wales in the photic zone, 154–165 m (505–541 ft) deep, in 1982 aboard the RV Tangaroa.
