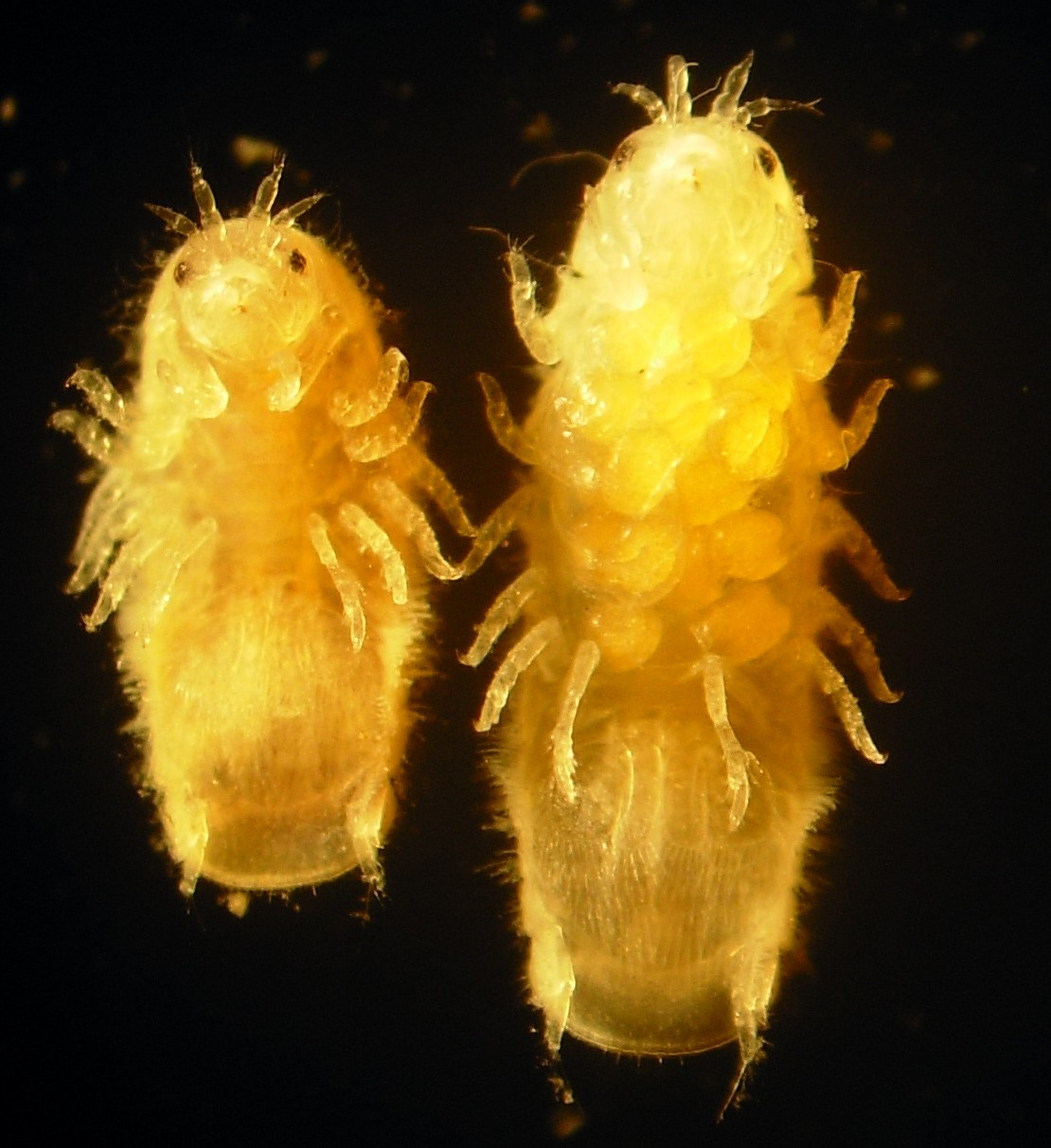
- Limnoria quadripunctata

Scientific classification
- Kingdom: Animalia
- Phylum: Arthropoda
- Clade: Pancrustacea
- Class: Malacostraca
- Order: Isopoda
- Family: Limnoriidae
- Genus: Limnoria; Leach, 1814

Species
- About 50; see text

= Limnoria =

Genus of crustaceans

Limnoria is a genus of isopods from the family Limnoriidae.

== Species ==
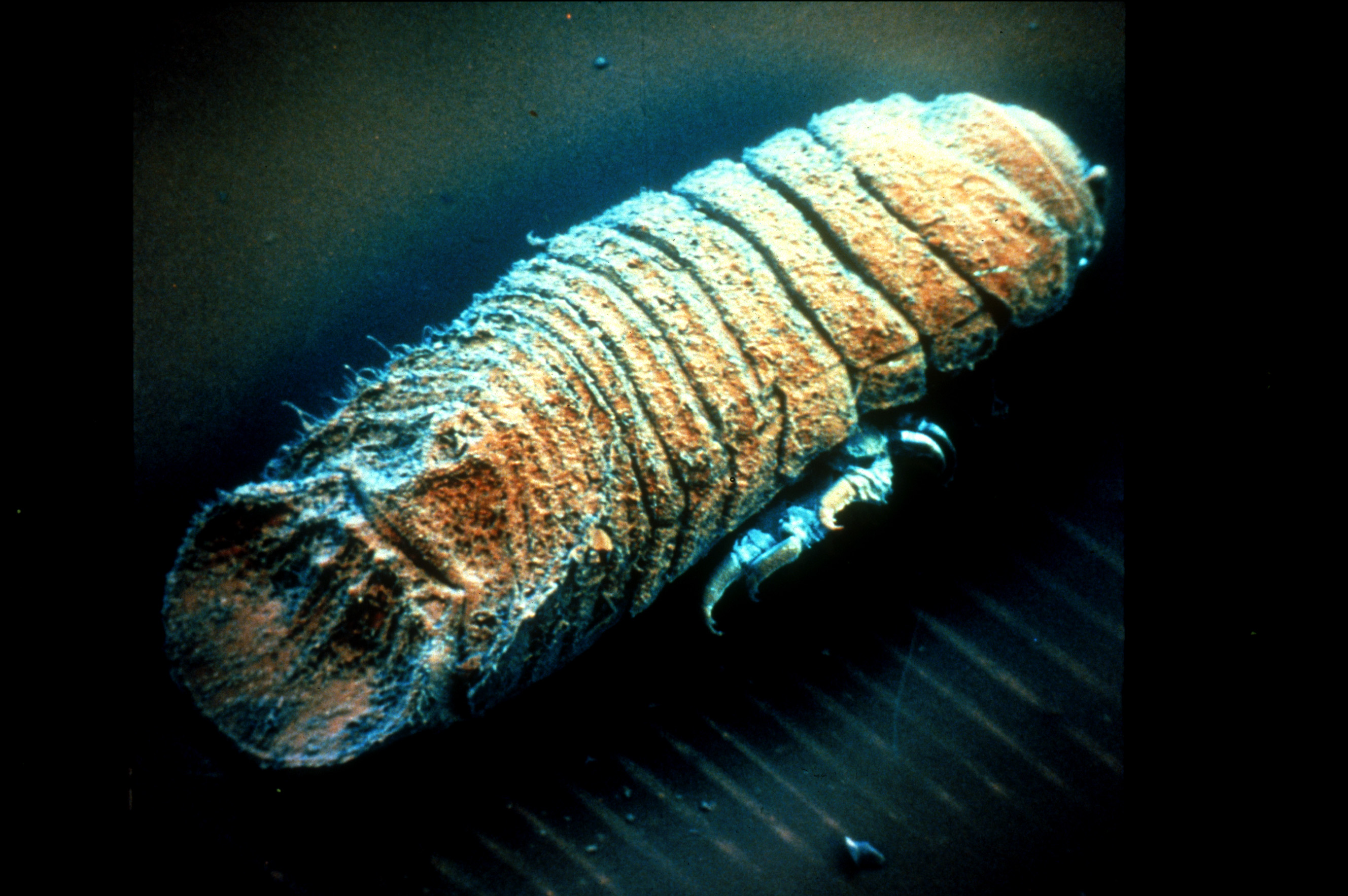
Limnoria quadripunctata

- Limnoria agrostisa (Cookson, 1991)
- Limnoria algarum (Menzies, 1957)
- Limnoria andamanensis (Rao & Ganapati, 1969)
- Limnoria antarctica (Pfeffer, 1887)
- Limnoria bacescui (Ortiz & Lalana, 1988)
- Limnoria bituberculata (Pillai, 1957)
- Limnoria bombayensis (Pillai, 1961)
- Limnoria borealis (Kussakin, 1963)
- Limnoria carinata (Menzies & Becker, 1957)
- Limnoria carptora (Cookson, 1997)
- Limnoria chilensis (Menzies, 1962)
- Limnoria clarkae (Kensley & Schotte, 1987)
- Limnoria convexa (Cookson, 1991)
- Limnoria cristata (Cookson & Cragg, 1991)
- Limnoria echidna (Cookson, 1991)
- Limnoria emarginata (Kussakin & Malyutina, 1989)
- Limnoria foveolata (Menzies, 1957)
- Limnoria gibbera (Cookson, 1991)
- Limnoria glaucinosa (Cookson, 1991)
- Limnoria hicksi (Schotte, 1989)
- Limnoria indica (Becker & Kampf, 1958)
- Limnoria insulae (Menzies, 1957)
- Limnoria japonica (Richardson, 1909)
- Limnoria kautensis (Cookson & Cragg, 1988)
- Limnoria lignorum (Rathke, 1799)
- Limnoria loricata (Cookson, 1991)
- Limnoria magadanensis (Jesakova, 1961)
- Limnoria mazzellae (Cookson & Lorenti, 2001)
- Limnoria multipunctata (Menzies, 1957)
- Limnoria nonsegnis (Menzies, 1957)
- Limnoria orbellum (Cookson, 1991)
- Limnoria pfefferi (Stebbing, 1904)
- Limnoria platycauda (Menzies, 1957)
- Limnoria poorei (Cookson, 1991)
- Limnoria quadripunctata (Holthuis, 1949)
- Limnoria raruslima (Cookson, 1991)
- Limnoria reniculus (Schotte, 1989)
- Limnoria rugosissima (Menzies, 1957)
- Limnoria saseboensis (Menzies, 1957)
- Limnoria segnis (Chilton, 1883)
- Limnoria segnoides (Menzies, 1957)
- Limnoria sellifera (Cookson et al., 2012)
- Limnoria septima (Barnard, 1936)
- Limnoria sexcarinata (Kuhne, 1975)
- Limnoria simulata (Menzies, 1957)
- Limnoria stephenseni (Menzies, 1957)
- Limnoria sublittorale (Menzies, 1957)
- Limnoria torquisa (Cookson, 1991)
- Limnoria tripunctata (Menzies, 1951)
- Limnoria tuberculata (Sowinsky, 1884)
- Limnoria uncapedis (Cookson, 1991)
- Limnoria unicornis (Menzies, 1957)
- Limnoria zinovae (Kussakin, 1963)

== See also ==
- Gribble
