= Globulus =

Globulus may refer to:

- a Roman cognomen
- an Amiga game
