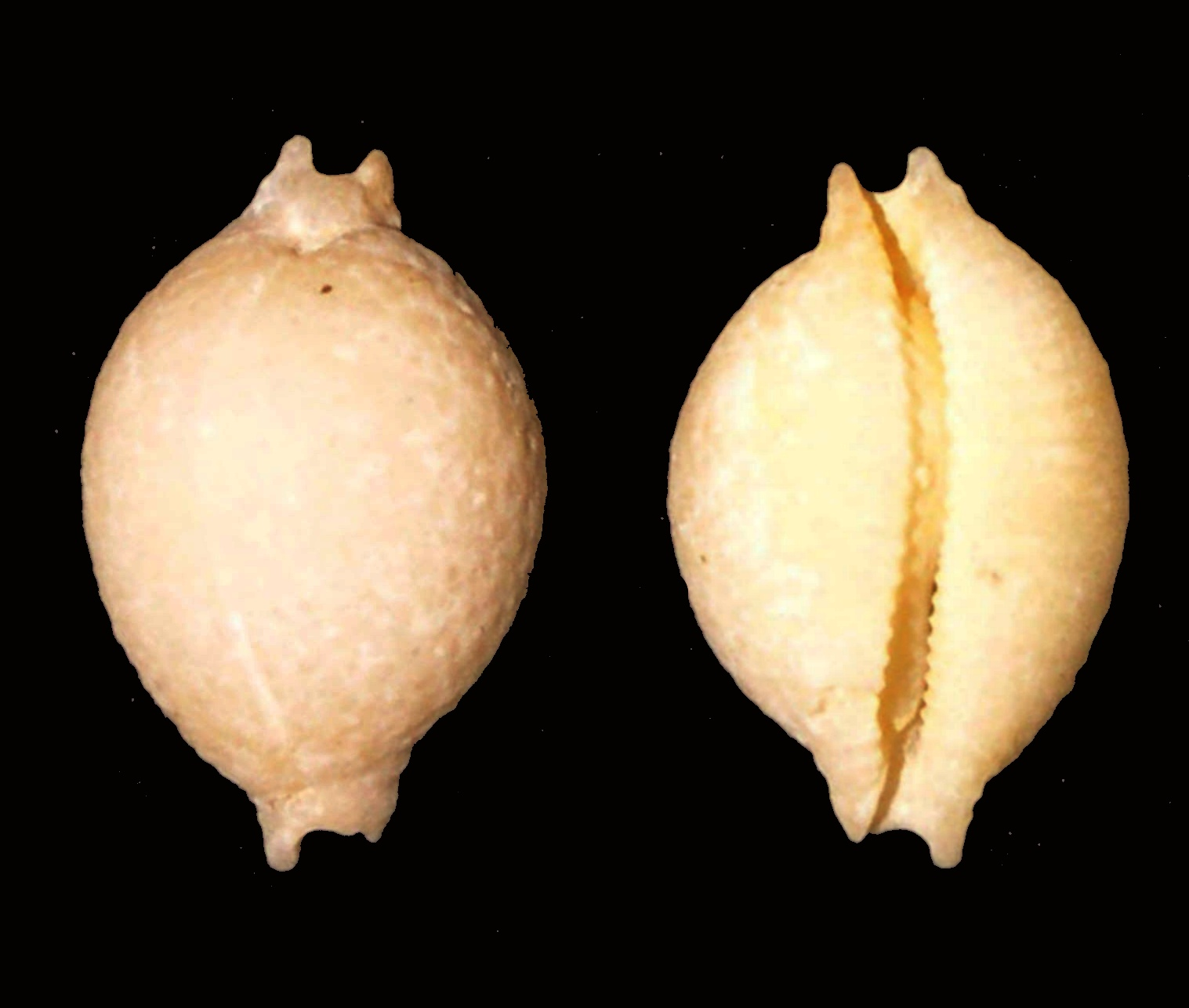

Scientific classification
- Kingdom: Animalia
- Phylum: Mollusca
- Class: Gastropoda
- Subclass: Caenogastropoda
- Order: Littorinimorpha
- Family: Cypraeidae
- Genus: Pustularia
- Species: P. cicercula

Binomial name
- Pustularia cicercula (Linnaeus, 1758

Synonyms
- Cypraea cicercula Linnaeus, 1758; Pustularia (Pustularia) cicercula (Linnaeus, 1758)

= Pustularia cicercula =

Species of gastropod

Pustularia cicercula is a species of sea snail, a cowry, a marine gastropod mollusc in the family Cypraeidae, the cowries.

== Subspecies ==
The following subspecies are recognized:

- Pustularia cicercula cicercula (Linnaeus, 1758)
- Pustularia cicercula takahashii Moretzsohn, 2007
- Pustularia cicercula tricornis (Jousseaume, 1874)
- Pustularia cicercula tuamotensis Lorenz, 1999
- Pustularia cicercula avrilae Heiman, 2009: synonym of Pustularia cicercula tuamotensis Lorenz, 1999
- Pustularia cicercula lienardi (Jousseaume, 1874): synonym of Pustularia cicercula tricornis (Jousseaume, 1874)

== Description ==
The length of the shell attains 20.3 mm, lateral diameter is 13.6 mm, and dorsoventral diameter is 11.8 mm

The shell is highly inflated, its extremities produced and slightly upturned; the granulose dorsal surface bears a shallow central crease.

== Distribution ==
This species and its subspecies occur in the Red Sea and in the Indian Ocean off Kenya, the Mascarene Basin, Mauritius, Réunion, and Tanzania.

A single fossil of the type species was collected from the post-Tertiary limestones of the New Hebrides.
