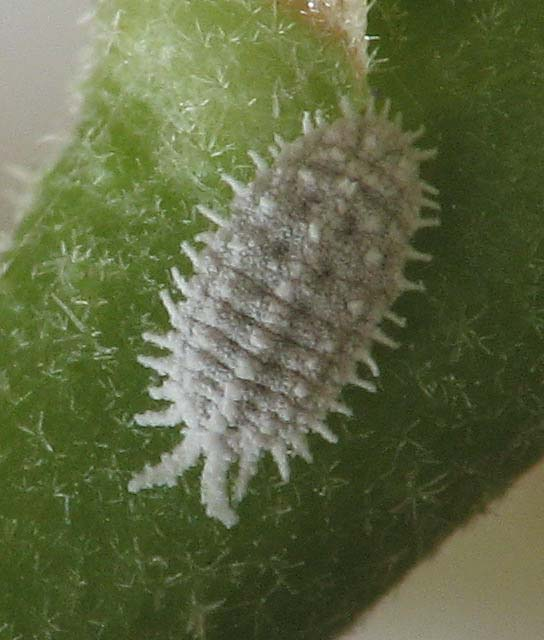

Scientific classification
- Domain: Eukaryota
- Kingdom: Animalia
- Phylum: Arthropoda
- Class: Insecta
- Order: Hemiptera
- Suborder: Sternorrhyncha
- Family: Pseudococcidae
- Genus: Phenacoccus
- Species: P. solani

Binomial name
- Phenacoccus solani Ferris, 1918

= Phenacoccus solani =

Species of true bug

Phenacoccus solani, the solanum mealybug, is a species of mealybug in the family Pseudococcidae.
