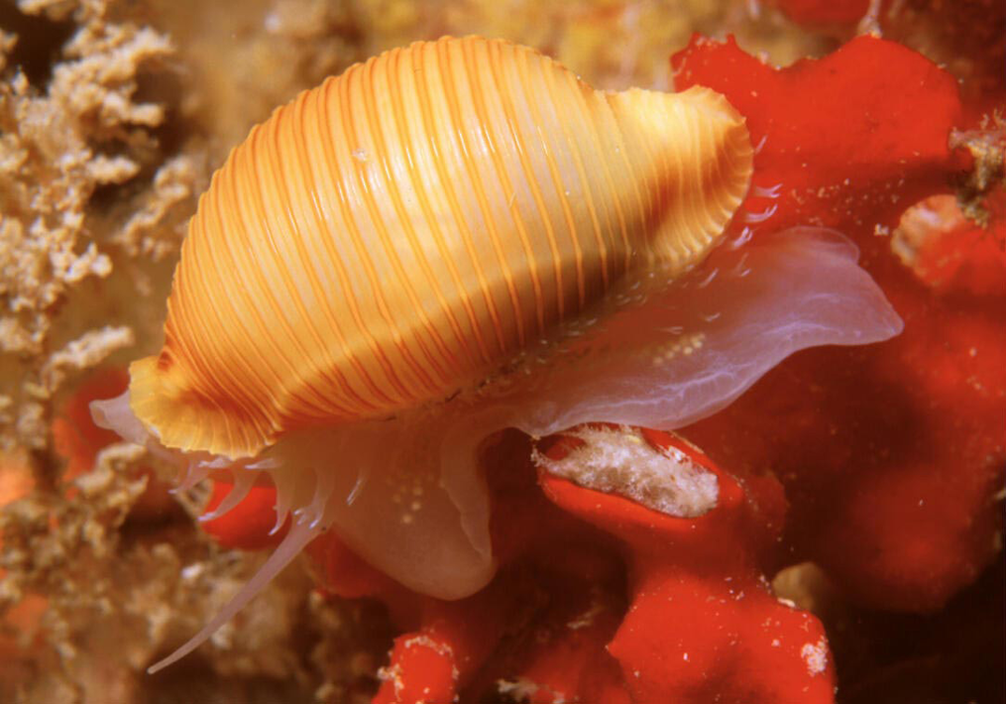
- A live individual of Ipsa childreni

Scientific classification
- Kingdom: Animalia
- Phylum: Mollusca
- Class: Gastropoda
- Subclass: Caenogastropoda
- Order: Littorinimorpha
- Family: Cypraeidae
- Genus: Ipsa; Jousseaume, 1884

= Ipsa =

Genus of gastropods

Ipsa is a genus of small or medium-sized sea snails, cowries, marine gastropod mollusks in the family Cypraeidae, the cowries.

== Species ==
Species within the genus Ipsa include:

- Ipsa childreni (Gray, 1825)
