= Jens Rathke =

Norwegian zoologist (1769–1855)

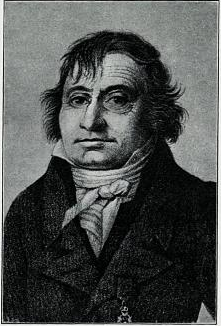
Jens Rathke

Jens Rathke (14 November 1769 – 28 February 1855) was Norway's first professor of zoology.

== Biography ==
Rathke was born in Christiania (now Oslo), Norway. He was the son of Casper Elias Rathke (1729–1777) and Margaretha Madsdatter Schultz (1735–1812). He was a student at the Christiania Cathedral School until 1787. Rathke took Cand.theol. at the University of Copenhagen in 1792, but soon left theology and began to study natural sciences.

In 1810, he became a zoology professor at the University of Copenhagen, where he also taught lessons in botany and mineralogy. In 1813, he moved to the University of Christiania (now University of Oslo) as a professor of natural history. He made several trips along the Norwegian coast from Bergen to Lofoten to investigate the conditions of fisheries. He presented the results of these studies in Beiträge zur Fauna Norwegens, which was published in 1843. Upon his death, he bequeathed his estate, funding a trust (Rathkes legat) at the University of Oslo to use for study of Norway's natural conditions.
