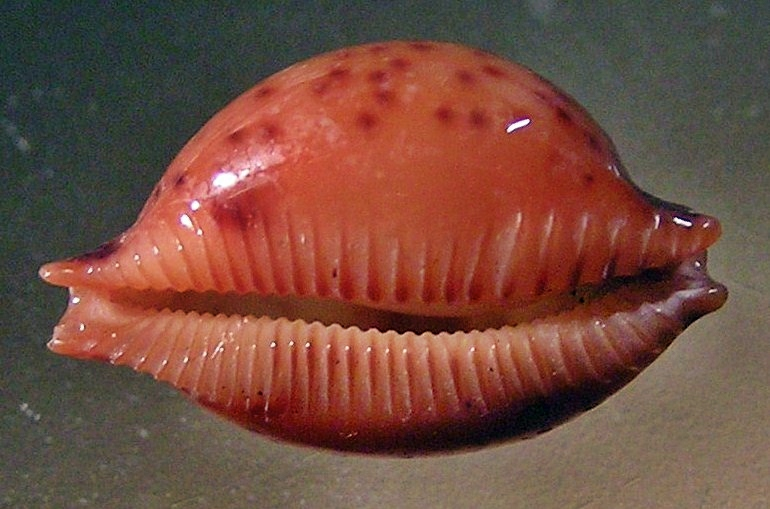
- Pustularia globulus globulus

Scientific classification
- Kingdom: Animalia
- Phylum: Mollusca
- Class: Gastropoda
- Subclass: Caenogastropoda
- Order: Littorinimorpha
- Family: Cypraeidae
- Genus: Pustularia
- Species: P. globulus

Binomial name
- Pustularia globulus (Linnaeus, 1758)

Synonyms
- Cypraea globulus Linnaeus, 1758

= Pustularia globulus =

Species of gastropod

Pustularia globulus is a species of sea snail, a marine gastropod mollusc in the family Cypraeidae, the cowries.

== Subspecies ==
- Pustularia globulus brevirostris Schilder & Schilder, 1938
- Pustularia globulus globulus (Linnaeus, 1758)
- Pustularia globulus sphaeridium Schilder & Schilder, 1938

Pustularia globulus marerubra Lorenz, 2009: synonym of Pustularia marerubra Lorenz, 2009 (original rank)

== Description ==
This species is characterized particularly by its globular form, beaked extremities and nongranular surface.

== Distribution ==
This marine species occurs in the Red Sea and in the Indian Ocean off Aldabra, Chagos, Kenya, Madagascar, the Mascarene Basin, Mauritius, Réunion, the Seychelles, and Tanzania.

A fossil has been found in Pliocene or Pleistocene strata on Guam, Mariana Islands.

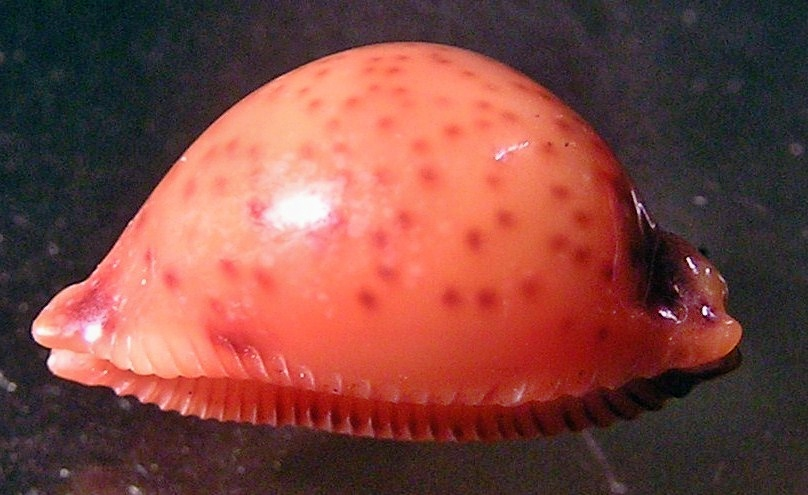

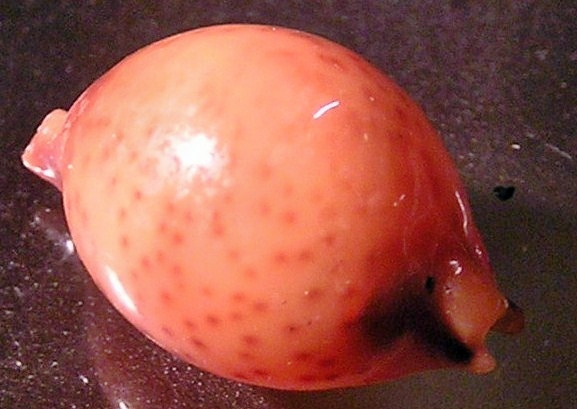
