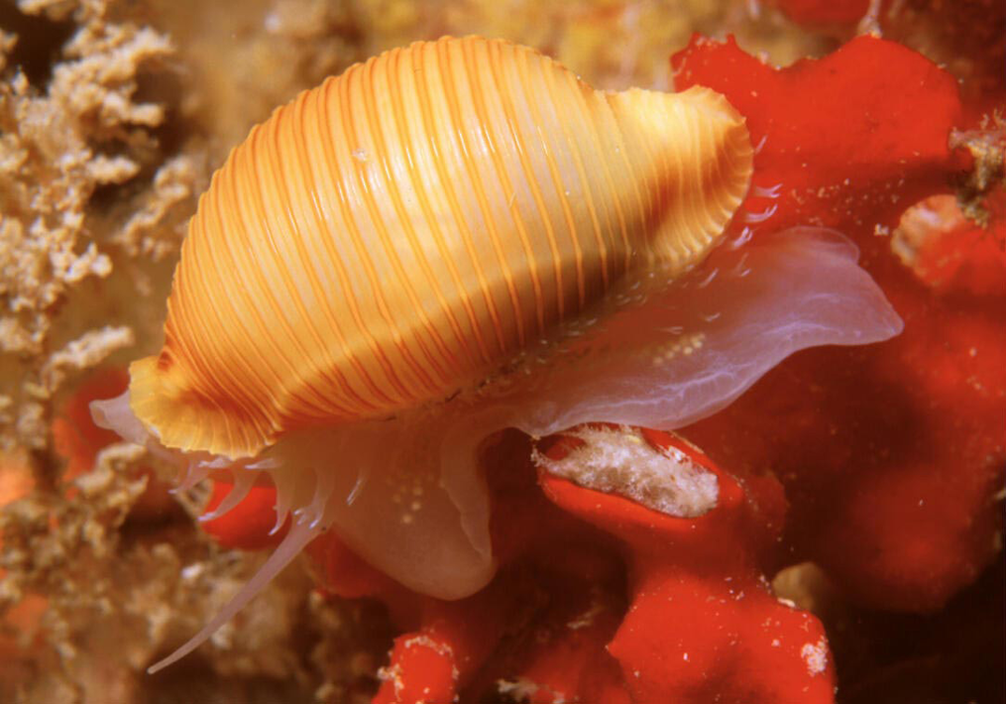
- A live individual of Ipsa childreni, head end towards the right

Scientific classification
- Domain: Eukaryota
- Kingdom: Animalia
- Phylum: Mollusca
- Class: Gastropoda
- Subclass: Caenogastropoda
- Order: Littorinimorpha
- Family: Cypraeidae
- Genus: Ipsa
- Species: I. childreni

Binomial name
- Ipsa childreni (Gray, 1825)

Synonyms
- Cypraea childreni J. E. Gray, 1825 superseded combination; Ipsa childreni childreni (J. E. Gray, 1825) superseded combination (no subspecies recognised); Ipsa childreni leforti Heiman, 2009 junior subjective synonym; Ipsa childreni lemurica F. A. Schilder & M. Schilder, 1938 junior subjective synonym; Ipsa childreni novaecaledoniae F. A. Schilder & M. Schilder, 1952 junior subjective synonym; Ipsa childreni samurai (F. A. Schilder & M. Schilder, 1940) junior subjective synonym; Pustularia (Ipsa) childreni (J. E. Gray, 1825); Pustularia (Ipsa) childreni samurai F. A. Schilder & M. Schilder, 1940; Pustularia childreni Gray, 1825

= Ipsa childreni =

Species of gastropod

Ipsa childreni is a species of small or medium-sized sea snail, a cowry, a marine gastropod mollusk in the family Cypraeidae, the cowries.

== Shell description ==
The length of the shell attains 22.4 mm, lateral diameter 15.3 mm, dorsoventral diameter 12.1 mm.

Two views of a shell of Ipsa childreni:

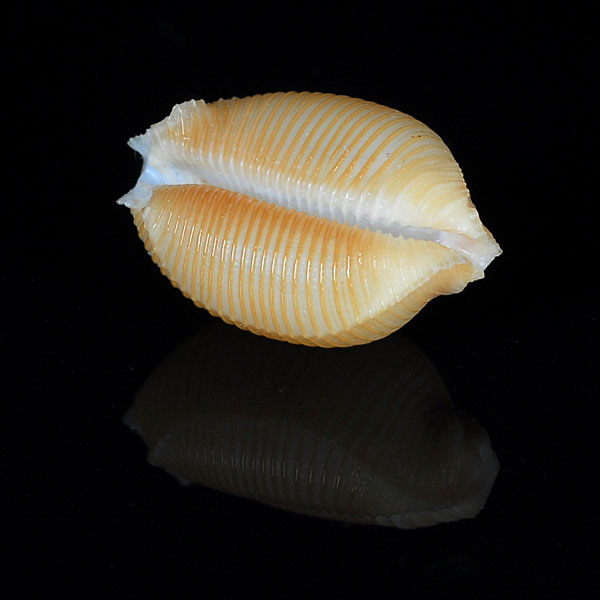

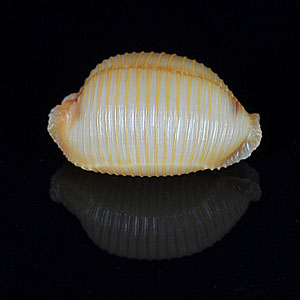

== Distribution ==
The species lives on many island groups from Mauritius in the Indian Ocean, eastward to Fiji and Hawaii.
