= Phenacoccus manihoti =

Scientific classification
- Domain: Eukaryota
- Kingdom: Animalia
- Phylum: Arthropoda
- Class: Insecta
- Order: Hemiptera
- Suborder: Sternorrhyncha
- Family: Pseudococcidae
- Genus: Phenacoccus
- Species: P. manihoti

Binomial name
- Phenacoccus manihoti Matile-Ferrero, 1977

Species of true bug

Phenacoccus manihoti is a mealybug insect species.

In the early 1970s, the cassava mealybug P. manihoti was accidentally introduced to Africa. Within 15 years of its discovery, it had invaded most of West and Central Africa and was spreading to the East. It soon became an important pest, and methods to control it became a topic of interest. The cassava mealybug was successfully suppressed at a continent-wide scale by the introduction of a specialist parasitic wasp, originally discovered in the mealybug's region of origin (i.e., Paraguay, Southern Brazil). This biological control endeavor was awarded with the 1995 World Food Prize being handed to Swiss entomologist Hans Rudolf Herren.

== Description ==
P. manihoti is a type of mealybug. It is commonly called the cassava mealybug because it feeds on cassava. It is an oligophagous insect that demonstrates an aphid-like phloem feeding behavior. P. manihoti reproduces by thelytokous parthenogenesis and goes through four in-star larval forms which have differing numbers of antennal segments. Mealybugs are noted for the production of dermal wax secretions. The body is covered with wax producing pores which have been well studied but the function of wax to particular species is based on speculation. Predictions about the function of dermal wax in the cassava mealybug suggest it is to prevent desiccation and to deter predators. The longer coils of wax secreted would be bitten first by a predator and give the cassava mealybug a chance to escape. Females have the highest fecundity on the first or second day of oviposition. The optimal temperature for populations of the cassava mealybug is between 20 and 30 degrees Celsius. The cassava mealybug has poor survivability during rainy season because it gets washed off the plant and drowns.

== Sensory structures ==
The cassava mealybug has similar host plant detection behavior to aphids. It uses sight and smell to detect a possible host, once it lands, it walks along the leaf surface and uses specialized sensory organs to determine viability. After this, it penetrates the plant using a stylet and tests the phloem for quality and quantity. Generally the cassava mealybug can determine if a plant will be a suitable host within the first step of walking on the leaf surface. It damages the cassava plant by causing deformation, defoliation, and stunted growth which leads to the death of the plant. The cassava mealybug uses antennae and receptors on the labium as a way to identify its host plant. The labium has thirty sensilla that include trichoid hairs and sensilla chaetica. The trichoid hairs function as mechanoreceptors, while the sensilla chaetica or pegs serve as mechanoreceptors, chemoreceptors and olfactory organs. There are several types of sensilla chaetica. Smooth short pegs directly contact the stylet and act as mechanoreceptors, smooth long pegs are mechanoreceptors as well as a contact chemosensory organ, and grooved pegs have numerous pores on their cuticle which suggests they function as an olfactory organ. The cassava mealybug also uses antennal sensilla as a way to identify host-plants. The antenna are thought to be useful in detecting volatile substances given off by the plant. The antenna have similar ultrastructures that are found on the labium except studies showed that there was up to 58 sensilla on the antenna, which is more than what is found on the labium. The sensilla can work as mechanoreceptors, thermo-hygro receptors, chemoreceptors and olfactory sensory organs.

== Damage ==
The cassava mealybug can destroy up to 54% of roots and 100% of leaves in locations of infestation. When it infests cassava it deteriorates the tissue mineral and nutrient contents. If the plant becomes stressed during dry season it is even more susceptible to infestation.

== Control ==
Pesticides were used as an initial response to the cassava mealybug problem. Many different kinds were used and studied and they did seem to be effective, but they were costly. The most effective pesticide tested was methidathion; in trials the infested cassava showed significant recovery.

Contrary to insecticide use, biological pest control provided a self-sustaining, cost-effective and environmentally-sound solution for mealybug suppression across the African cassava belt. The use of the introduced parasitoid Anagyrus lopezi proved to be a spectacular success story in the biological control of the cassava mealybug. The parasitoid attacks the second and third instar stages of the cassava mealybug. Within a few years of its release it covered the entire country, and within five years there were no high concentrations of the cassava mealybug present. The successful elimination of the cassava mealybug across the African continent increased cassava yields and improved farmer livelihoods, without any negative environmental side-effects. Biological control of the cassava mealybug generated economic benefits of over US$120 billion, averted widespread famine across subSaharan Africa and purportedly saved the lives of 20 million people.

This biological control effort was replicated in Southeast Asia, where P. manihoti had made its unfortunate arrival in 2008. The introduction of A. lopezi lowered mealybug infestation levels to considerable extent, restored cassava yields, exerted stabilizing effects on prices and inter-country trade of different cassava products - including starch.
