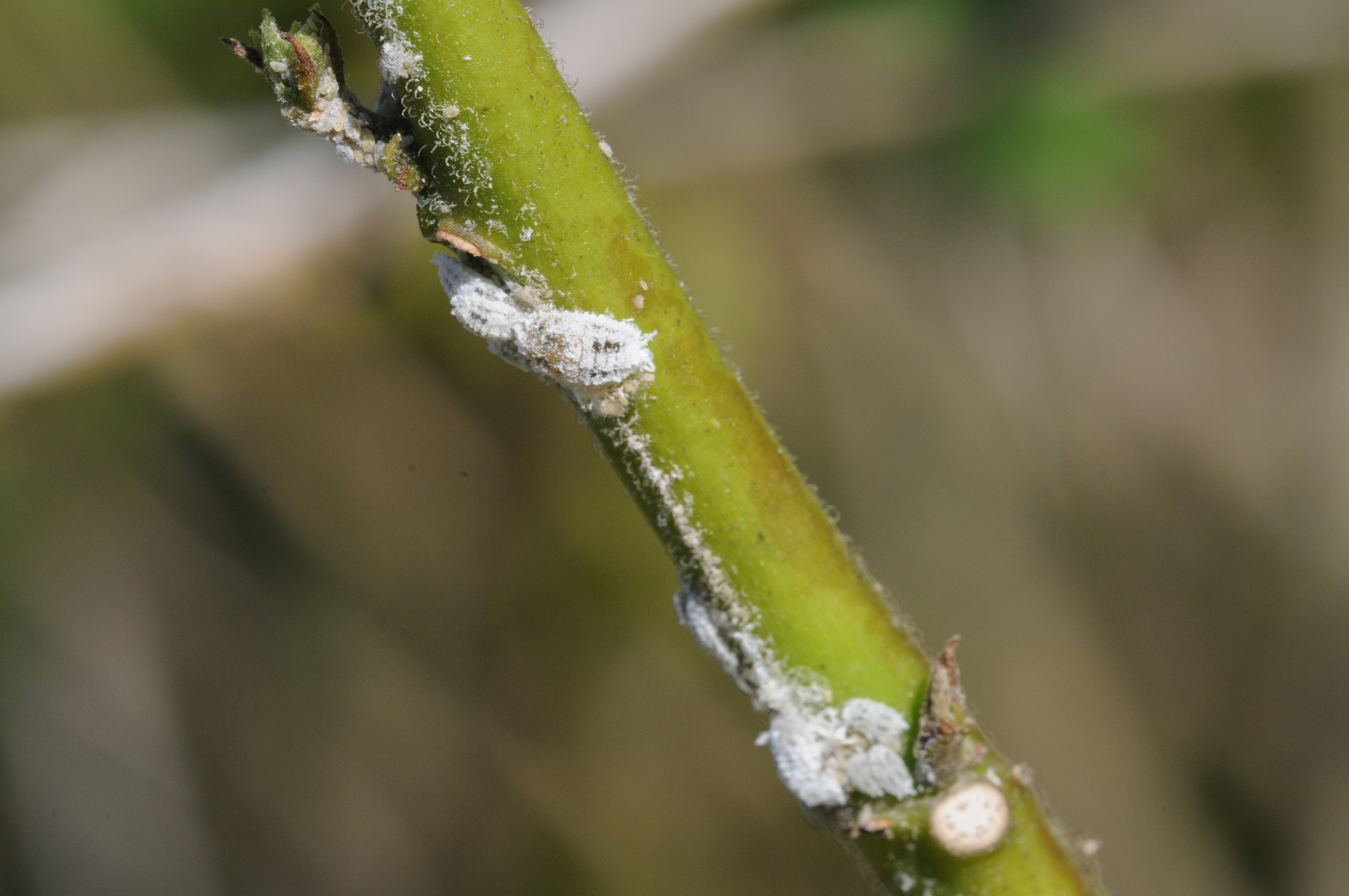

Scientific classification
- Domain: Eukaryota
- Kingdom: Animalia
- Phylum: Arthropoda
- Class: Insecta
- Order: Hemiptera
- Suborder: Sternorrhyncha
- Family: Pseudococcidae
- Genus: Phenacoccus
- Species: P. solenopsis

Binomial name
- Phenacoccus solenopsis Tinsley, 1898

= Phenacoccus solenopsis =

Species of true bug

Phenacoccus solenopsis, the cotton mealybug or solenopsis mealybug, is a species of mealybug in the family Pseudococcidae. Having originated in North America, it has spread to other parts of the world and become a major pest of cotton crops.

== Description ==
The adult female is ellipsoidal in shape, about 5 mm (0.2 in) long and 3 mm (0.12 in) wide, with a convex dorsal surface and a flat ventral surface. The body is yellowish-grey but this is largely obscured by the waxy secretions that cover the body, although the segmentation can still be seen. There is a transverse, darker bar on the dorsal surface. There are 18 pairs of very short, lateral wax filaments, and several slightly longer caudal filaments.

== Distribution and hosts ==
This species was discovered and first described in New Mexico in 1898 by the American entomologist J. D. Tinsley; he found it in an underground ants' nest where it was feeding on the roots and stems of Boerhavia spicata and Kallstroemia californica, and described it from stems of the four wing saltbush (Atriplex canescens). It was not reported again until 1967 when it was detected in Arizona, California, Colorado, Mississippi, Texas and Washington D.C.. By 1988 it was found on cotton in a number of areas of Texas and had adapted to feed on 29 different species of plant. It continued to spread in North America and later to other parts of the world, being reported in India in 2004, Pakistan and Brazil in 2005, and China and Sri Lanka in 2008. It is now additionally present in other countries in Asia, Europe, Canada, South America, Africa and Australasia. In India, where the mealybug has become a serious pest of cotton, the winter cherry Withania somnifera has been reported as a new reservoir host of the insect.

== Ecology ==
The adult female cotton mealybug lays several hundred eggs in an ovisac. On hatching, the nymphs crawl away, dispersing to other parts of the plant. In dry conditions, they move to the roots and the lower leaves and stems, however in wetter conditions they prefer the upper parts of the plant. They may be carried inadvertently by birds or animals to other plants. The adults and nymphs suck sap from the host plant, and secrete the excess fluid as honeydew. Sooty mould tends to grow on the honeydew, and ants are often found among the mealybugs feeding on the secretion. Natural predators of adults and nymphs include ladybirds, and an encyrtid wasp is an effective parasitoid.

== Damage ==
An infestation of this mealybug on cotton causes stunting of plants and yellowing, distortion and premature shedding of leaves; the presence of sooty mould reduces photosynthesis, bolls may not develop properly and yields of lint are reduced by an average of 35% in India.
