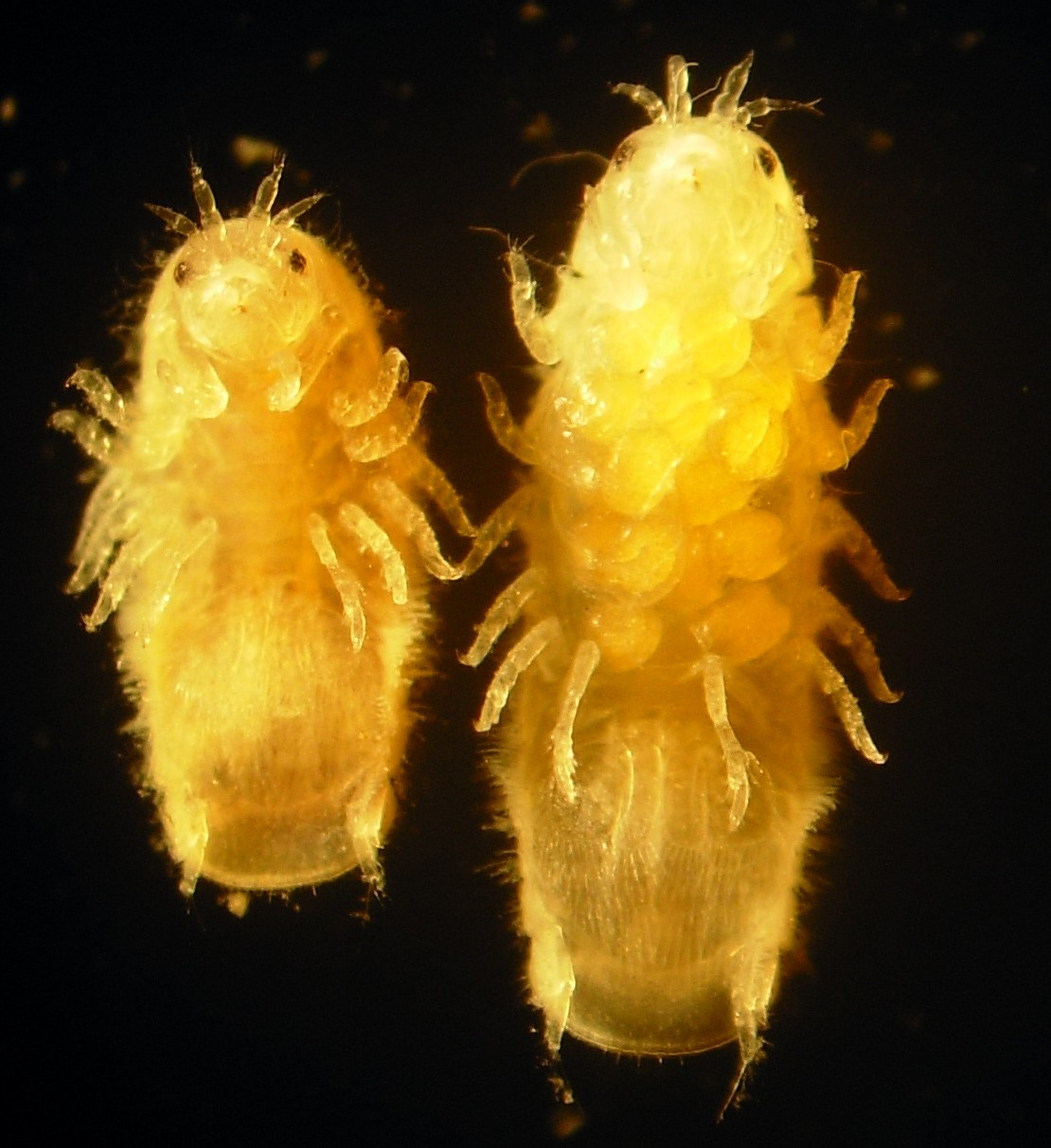

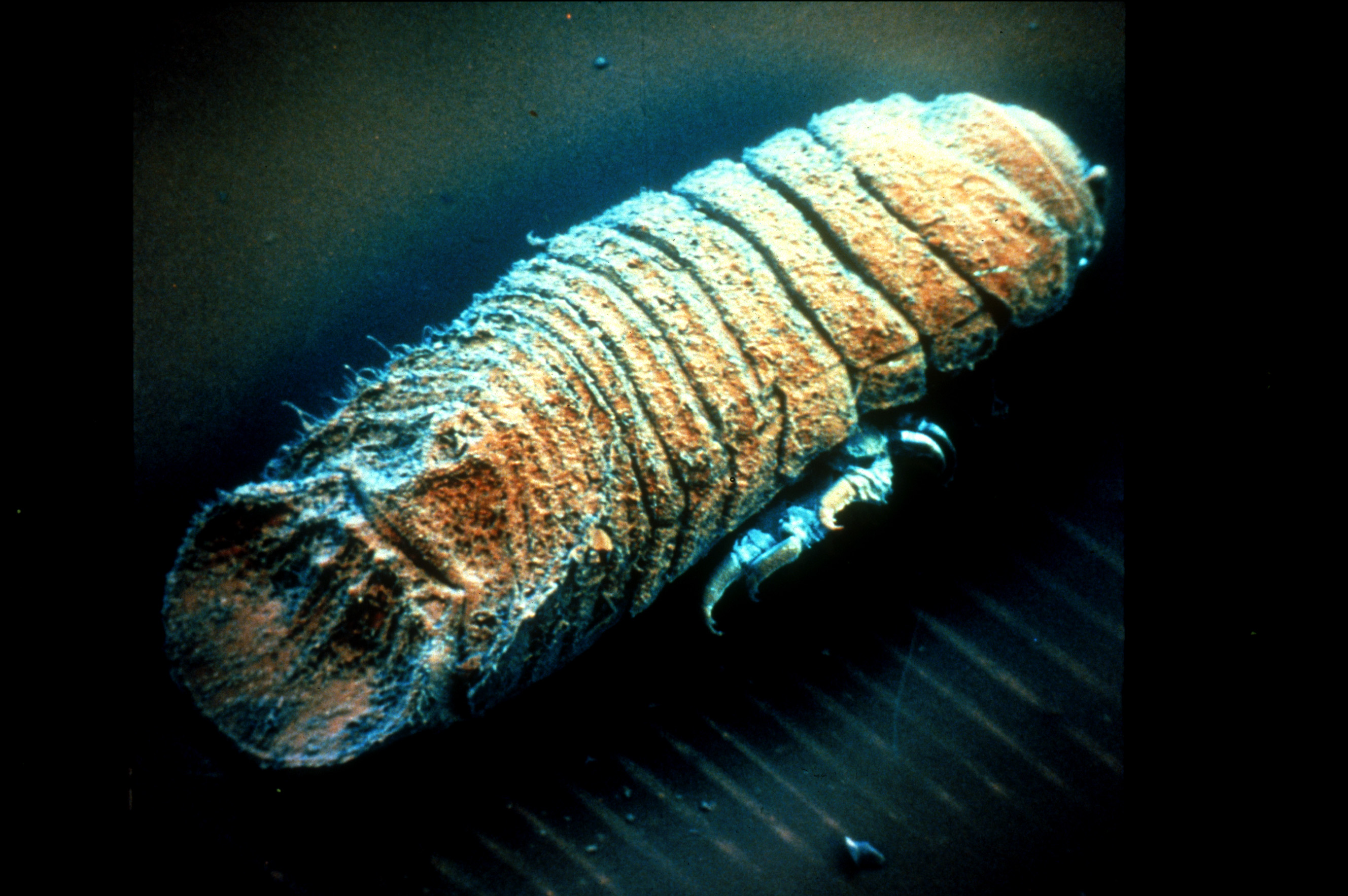

Scientific classification
- Kingdom: Animalia
- Phylum: Arthropoda
- Clade: Pancrustacea
- Class: Malacostraca
- Order: Isopoda
- Family: Limnoriidae
- Genus: Limnoria
- Species: L. quadripunctata

Binomial name
- Limnoria quadripunctata Holthius, 1949

= Limnoria quadripunctata =

Species of isopod

Limnoria quadripunctata is a species of isopod from the family Limnoriidae.

== Description ==
Limnoria quadripunctata can reach up to 4 mm in length, however are more typically 3 mm or less. Anatomical structure of the species conforms to typical isopod patterns. The pleotelson has a square, anteromedial array of four punctae, characteristic to L. quadripunctata.

== Distribution ==
The species has been reported in southwestern Ireland, southern UK, western France, Portugal, southwestern Italy, the West Coast of the US, Chile, New Zealand, southern Australia, the southern Indian Ocean in Saint Paul and Amsterdam Islands, and between Table Bay and Port Elizabeth in South Africa.

== Habitat ==
Limnoria quadripunctata lives in wooden structures, such as fallen trees or branches carried to the ocean by river. The species is mainly observed in the intertidal zone, though some specimens have been collected from 30 m. Its distribution may suggest L. quadripunctata is limited to temperate water.
