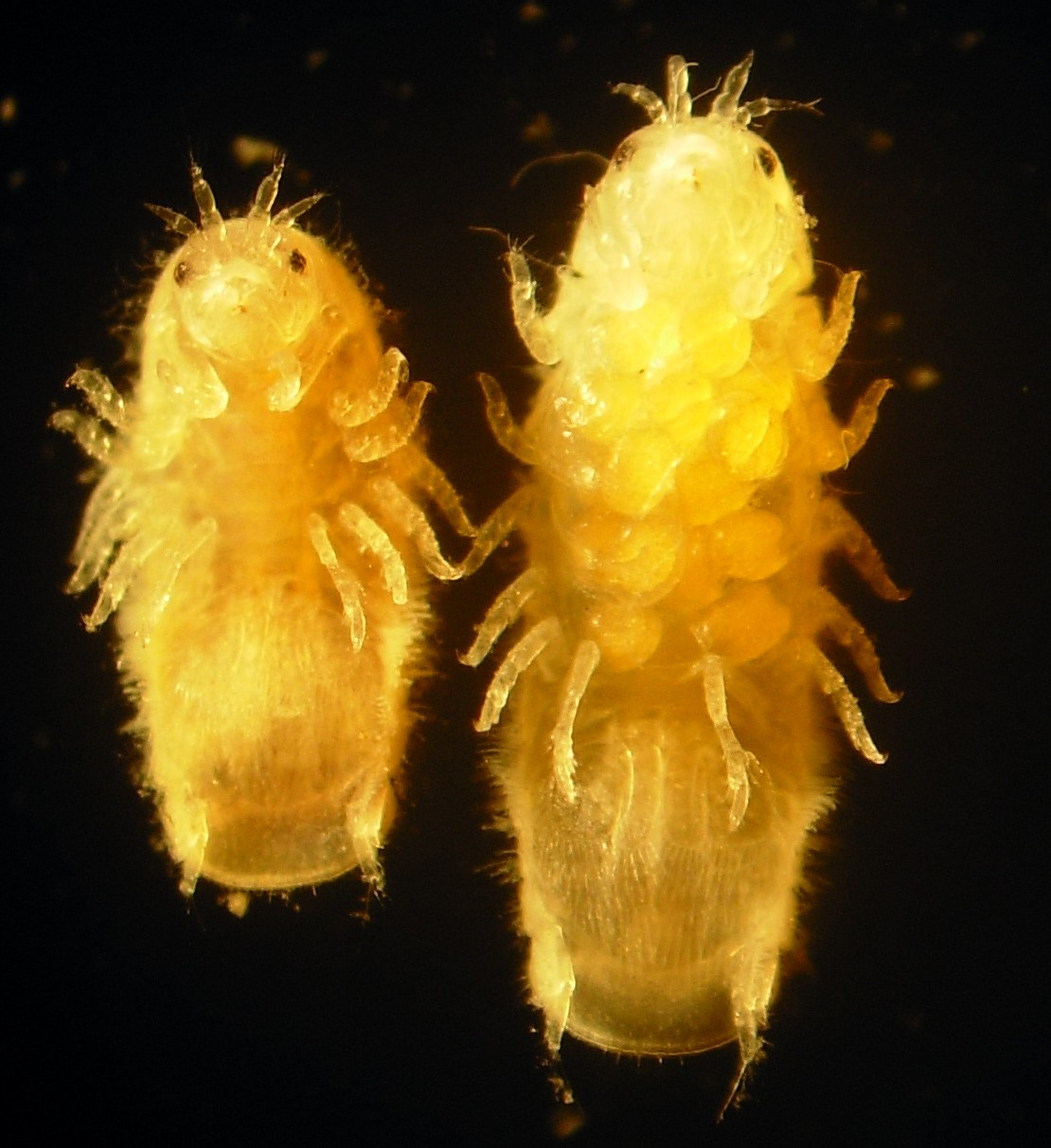
- Limnoria quadripunctata

Scientific classification
- Kingdom: Animalia
- Phylum: Arthropoda
- Clade: Pancrustacea
- Class: Malacostraca
- Order: Isopoda
- Superfamily: Limnorioidea
- Family: Limnoriidae; White, 1850

Genera
- Limnoria Leach, 1814; Lynseia Poore, 1987; Paralimnoria Menzies, 1957

= Gribble =

Limnoriidae

Family of crustaceans

A gribble (/ˈɡrɪbəl/) or gribble worm is any of about 56 species of marine isopod from the family Limnoriidae. They are mostly pale white and small (1–4 millimetres or 0.04–0.16 inches long) crustaceans, although Limnoria stephenseni from subantarctic waters can reach 10 mm (0.4 in).

== Classification ==
The term "gribble" was originally assigned to the wood-boring species, especially the first species described from Norway by Jens Rathke in 1799, Limnoria lignorum. The Limnoriidae are now known to include seaweed and seagrass borers, as well as wood borers. Those gribbles able to bore into living marine plants are thought to have evolved from a wood (dead plant) boring species.

== Ecology ==
Gribbles bore into wood and plant material, and the material is ingested for food; the cellulose of wood is digested, most likely with the aid of cellulases produced by the gribbles themselves. The most destructive species are Limnoria lignorum, L. tripunctata and L. quadripunctata. Due to dispersal while inhabiting wooden ships, it is uncertain where these three mentioned species ultimately originated from; the habitat that they first evolved in is unknown.

Gribbles play an ecologically important role by helping to degrade and recycle driftwood. Most seaweed-boring gribbles attack holdfasts which can cause the seaweed to come adrift especially during storms. For example, Limnoria segnis and L. stephenseni inhabit the holdfasts of Durvillaea antarctica and other species of southern bull-kelp; these isopods have rafted thousands of kilometres across the Southern Ocean inside of these holdfasts.

For defence, gribbles can jam themselves within their burrows using their uropods and block the tunnel with their rear disc-shaped segment, the pleotelson, an example of phragmosis.

A number of crustaceans have evolved as commensals with Limnoriidae. Species of Chelura are amphipods that inhabit the more severely attacked regions of gribble-attacked wood. Donsiella are tiny copepods that inhabit the brood pouch and body of Limnoriidae.

== Relation to humans ==
Limnoriidae are second only to the Teredinidae (the shipworms) in the amount of destruction caused to marine timber structures such as jetties and piers. L. tripunctata is unusually tolerant of creosote, a preservative often used to protect timber piles, due to symbiosis with creosote-degrading bacteria. Gribbles bore the surface layers of wood, unlike the Teredinidae which attack more deeply. Their burrows are 1–2 mm diameter, may be several centimetres long, and have the burrow’s roof punctured with a series of smaller "ventilation" holes. Attacked wood can become spongy and friable.

It has been suggested that the enzymes used by Limnoriidae to break down wood may be useful for producing sugar from non-food biomass, such as wood or straw, in a sustainable way. This could then be used to produce alternative fuels. "Enzymes produced by the tiny creatures are able to break down woody cellulose and turn it into energy-rich sugars meaning that gribble could convert wood and straw into liquid biofuel." One particular enzyme produced in the gribble's hepatopancreas and secreted into its gut has recently been identified and characterized: the GH7 cellobiohydrolase, LqCel7B. This enzyme has been shown to be highly effective in a saline environment such as that in which the gribble lives.
