= Pometia =

Pometia may refer to:

- Suessa Pometia, an ancient Roman city
- Pometia (plant), a genus of plants in the maple family
  - Pometia pinnata, a species of Pometia
