= Manna =

Edible substance described in the Bible

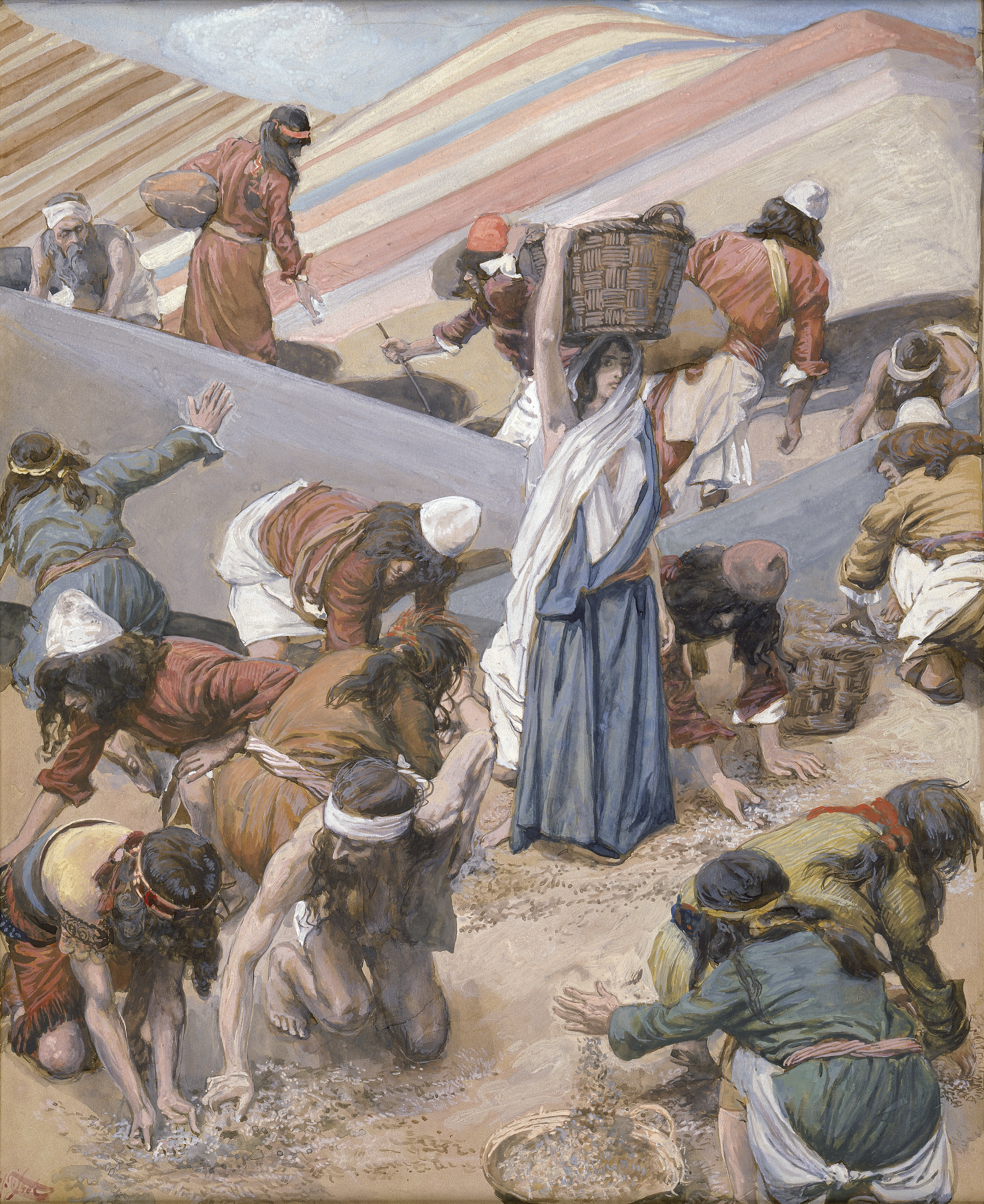
The Gathering of the Manna by James Tissot

Manna (Hebrew: מָן, romanized: mān, Greek: μάννα; Arabic: اَلْمَنُّ), sometimes or archaically spelled mana, is described in the Bible and the Quran as an edible substance that God bestowed upon the Israelites while they were wandering the desert during the 40-year period that followed the Exodus and preceded the conquest of Canaan.

== Description ==
=== Biblical narrative ===
In the Hebrew Bible, manna is described twice: once in Exodus 16:1–36 with the full narrative surrounding it, and once again in Numbers 11:1–9 as a part of a separate narrative. In the description in the Book of Exodus, manna is described as being "a fine, flake-like thing" like the frost on the ground. It is described in the Book of Numbers as arriving with the dew during the night. Exodus adds that it had to be collected before it was melted by the heat of the Sun, and that it was like a coriander seed in size, but white in colour.

Numbers describes it as having the appearance of bdellium, adding that the Israelites ground it and pounded it into cakes, which were then baked, resulting in something that tasted like cakes baked with oil. Exodus states that raw manna tasted like wafers that had been made with honey. The Israelites were instructed to eat only the manna they had gathered for each day. Stored manna "bred worms and stank", the exception being that stored the day before the Sabbath (Preparation Day), when twice the amount of manna was gathered. This manna did not spoil overnight. Exodus 16:23–24 states:

This is what the LORD commanded: "Tomorrow is to be a day of rest, a holy Sabbath to the LORD. So bake what you want to bake and boil what you want to boil. Save whatever is left and keep it until morning". So they saved it until morning, as Moses commanded, and it did not stink or get maggots in it.

=== Quranic narrative ===
The word mana appears three times in the Quran, at 2:57, 7:160, and 20:80. It is narrated in Sahih Muslim that Muhammad said: "Truffles are part of the 'manna' which God sent to the people of Israel through Moses, and its juice is a medicine for the eye."

=== Identification ===
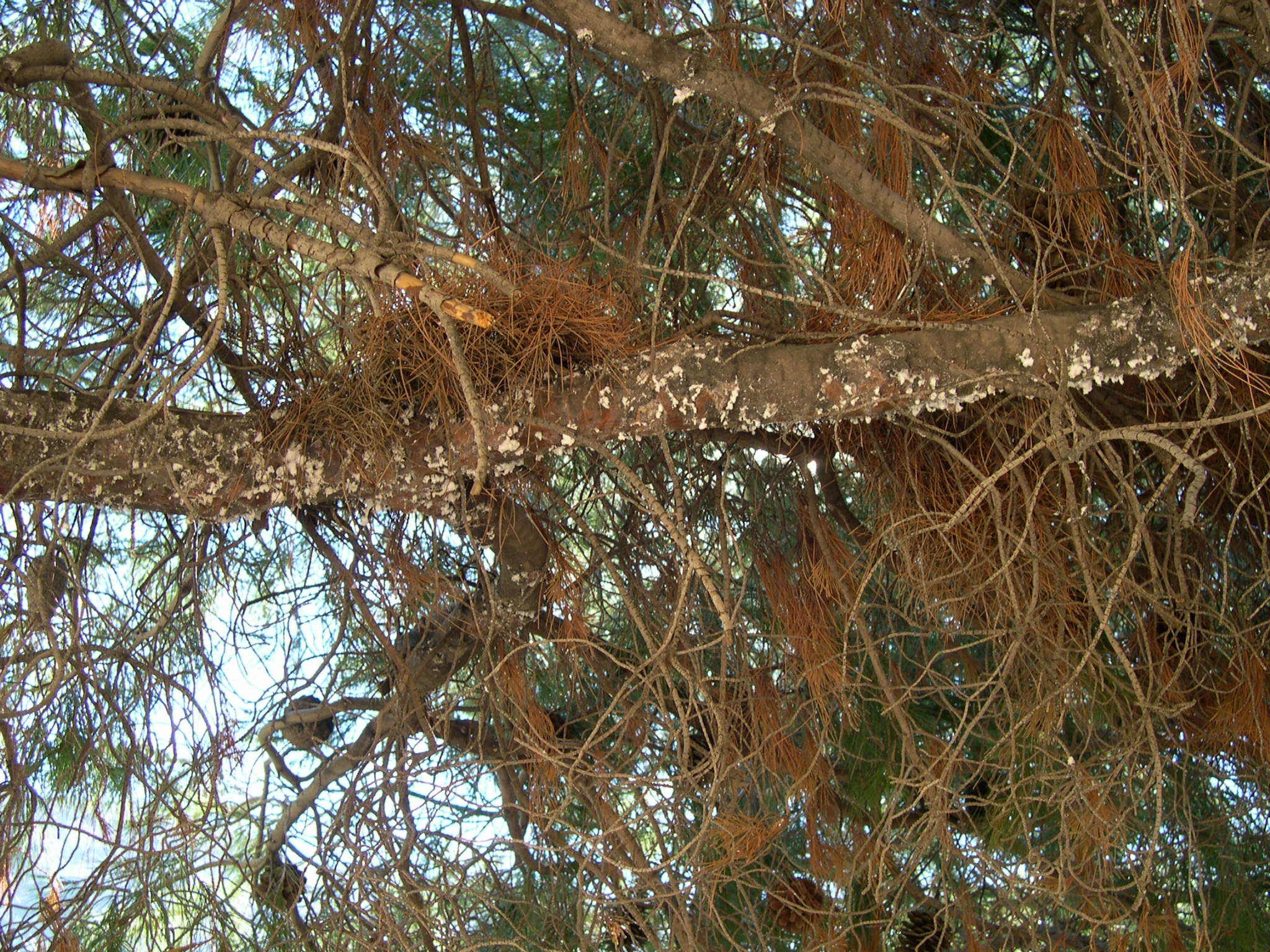
Pine branch with Marchalina hellenica honeydew

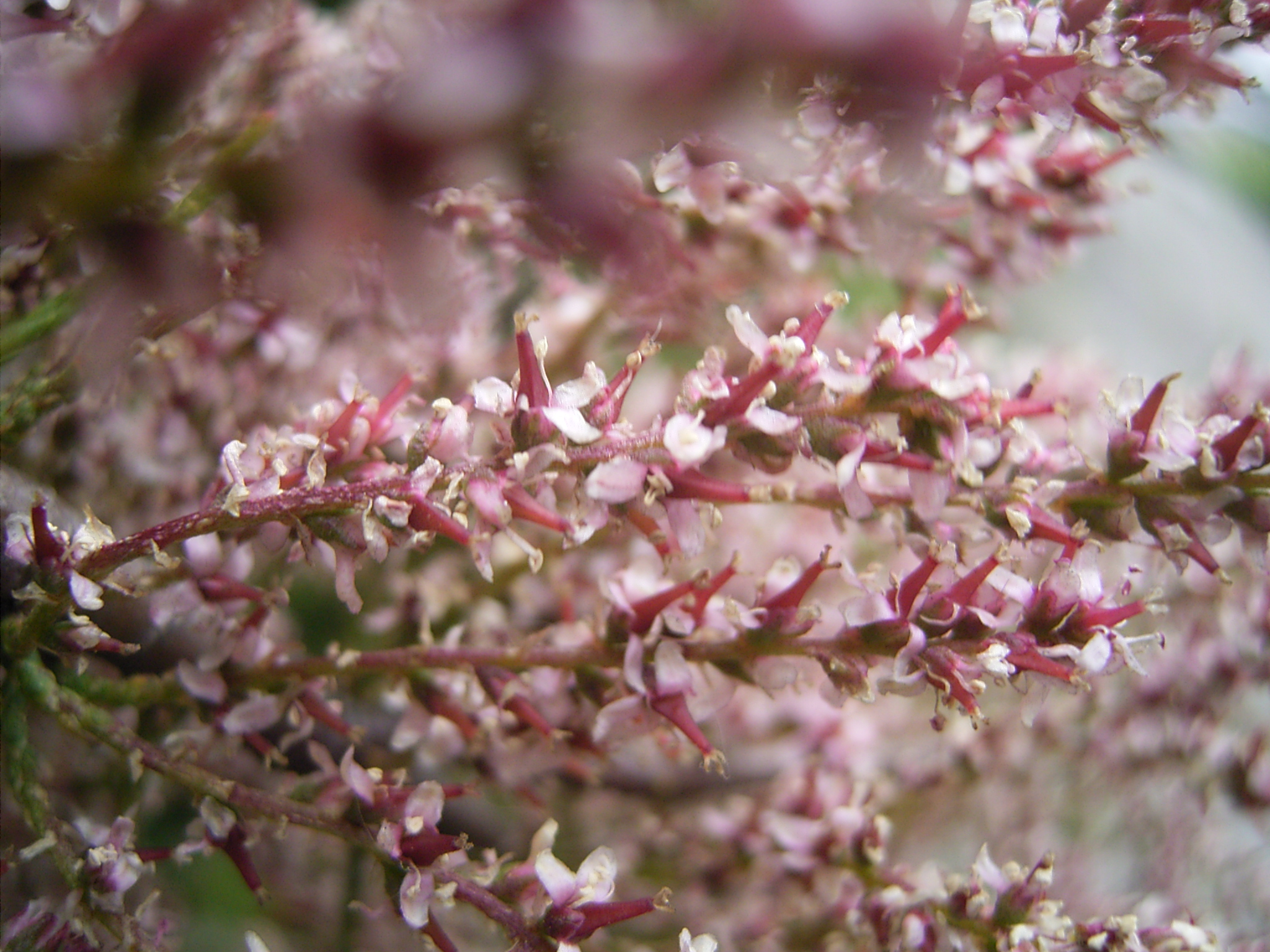
Tamarix gallica

In the biblical account, the name Manna is said to derive from the question "man hu?" (Hebrew: מן הוא, romanized: mān hū), seemingly meaning "What is it?", which is perhaps derived from Aramaic, not Hebrew. Man is possibly cognate with the Arabic term man (من), meaning aphids, with man hu thus meaning "this is aphids", which fits one widespread modern identification of manna as the crystallized honeydew of certain scale insects (lerp). In the environment of a desert, such honeydew rapidly dries due to evaporation of its water content, becoming a sticky solid, and later turning whitish, yellowish, or brownish.

In particular, there is a scale insect that feeds on tamarisk, the Tamarisk manna scale (Trabutina mannipara), the secretions of which are often considered to be the prime candidate for biblical manna. At the turn of the twentieth century, Arabs of the Sinai Peninsula were selling this substance as man es-simma من السما, roughly meaning "heavenly manna". Tamarisk trees (particularly Tamarix gallica) were once comparatively extensive throughout the southern Sinai, and the honeydew produced by the Tamarisk manna scale is similar to wax, melts in the sun, is sweet and aromatic (like honey), and has a dirty-yellow color, fitting somewhat with the biblical descriptions of manna. However, being mostly composed of sugar, it would be unlikely to provide sufficient nutrition for a population to survive over long periods of time, and it would be very difficult for it to have been compacted into cakes.

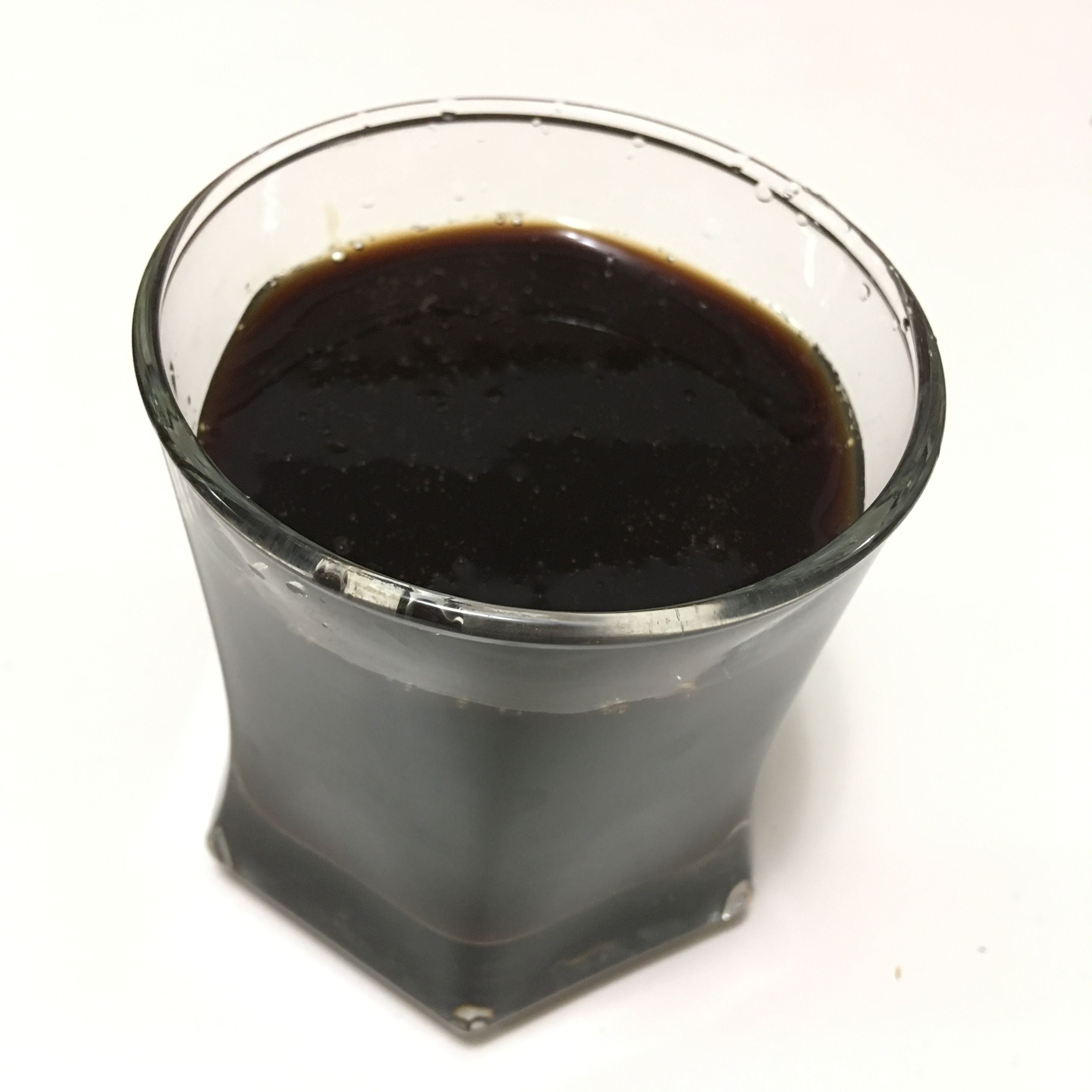
Syrup of Kurdish manna also known as gezo consumed as food in Kurdistan

Another type of honeydew is turkey oak manna, also called Persian gezengevi-gezo, men, Turkish kudret helvasi, man-es-simma, also Diarbekir manna, or Kurdish manna. It is called gezo and shoka. It is formed by aphids and appears white. It is common across Iranian Kurdistan, Iraqi Kurdistan and Turkish Kurdistan. When dried it forms into crystalline lumps which are hard and look like stone. They are pounded before inclusion in breads.

Some scholars have proposed that manna is cognate with the Egyptian term mennu (mnw), which designated a substance that figured in offerings; a white aromatic plant that smelled of antiu (possibly myrrh).

Other researchers have believed manna to be a form of lichen – a plant-like colony that often has a low mass per unit volume density and a large "sail area". In particular, Lecanora esculenta has been postulated. Known natural aerial falls of various lichens have been described as occurring in accounts separate from that in the Bible. "In some parts of Asia Lecanora esculenta covers the soil to such a degree that, according to Parrot, it forms beds 15 to 20 centimetres thick."

In 1921, the American consul in Jerusalem reported to the American government that he had identified manna as a "form of dew" that "hardens and assumes the form of a grain" when it falls on the leaves of oak trees.

=== Differences ===
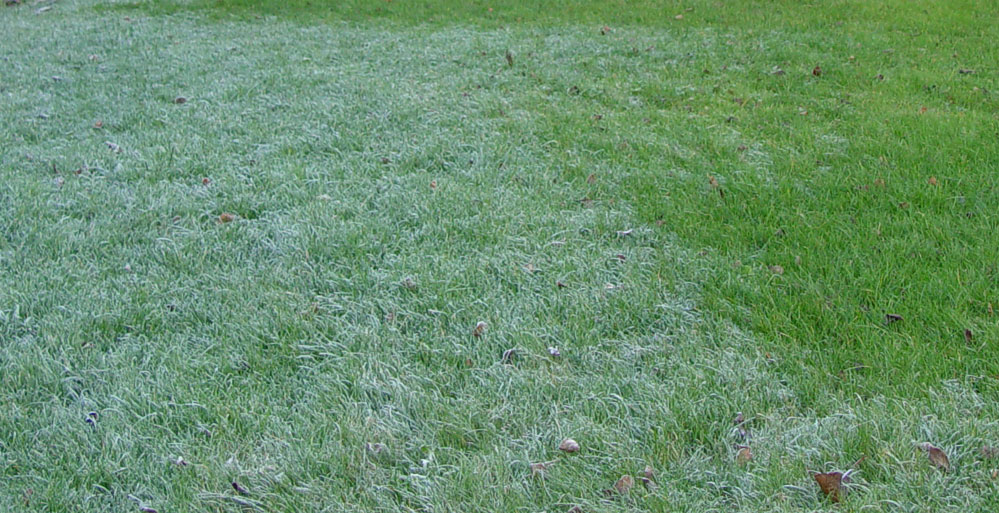
Hoarfrost on grass lawn. Manna is described as white and comparable to hoarfrost in colour.

Some form critics posit conflicting descriptions of manna as derived from different lore, with the description in Numbers being from the Jahwist tradition, and the description in Exodus being from the later Priestly tradition. The Babylonian Talmud states that the differences in description were due to the taste varying depending on who ate it, with it tasting like honey for small children, like bread for youths, and like oil for the elderly. Similarly, classical rabbinical literature rectifies the question of whether manna came before or after dew, by holding that the manna was sandwiched between two layers of dew, one falling before the manna, and the other after.

== Origin ==
Manna is from Heaven, according to the Hebrew Bible and to Jesus in the New Testament, but the various identifications of manna are naturalistic. In the Mishnah, manna is treated as a natural but unique substance, "created during the twilight of the sixth day of Creation", and ensured to be clean, before it arrives, by the sweeping of the ground by a northern wind and subsequent rains. According to classical rabbinical literature, manna was ground in a heavenly mill for the use of the righteous, but some of it was allocated to the wicked and left for them to grind themselves.

== Use and function ==
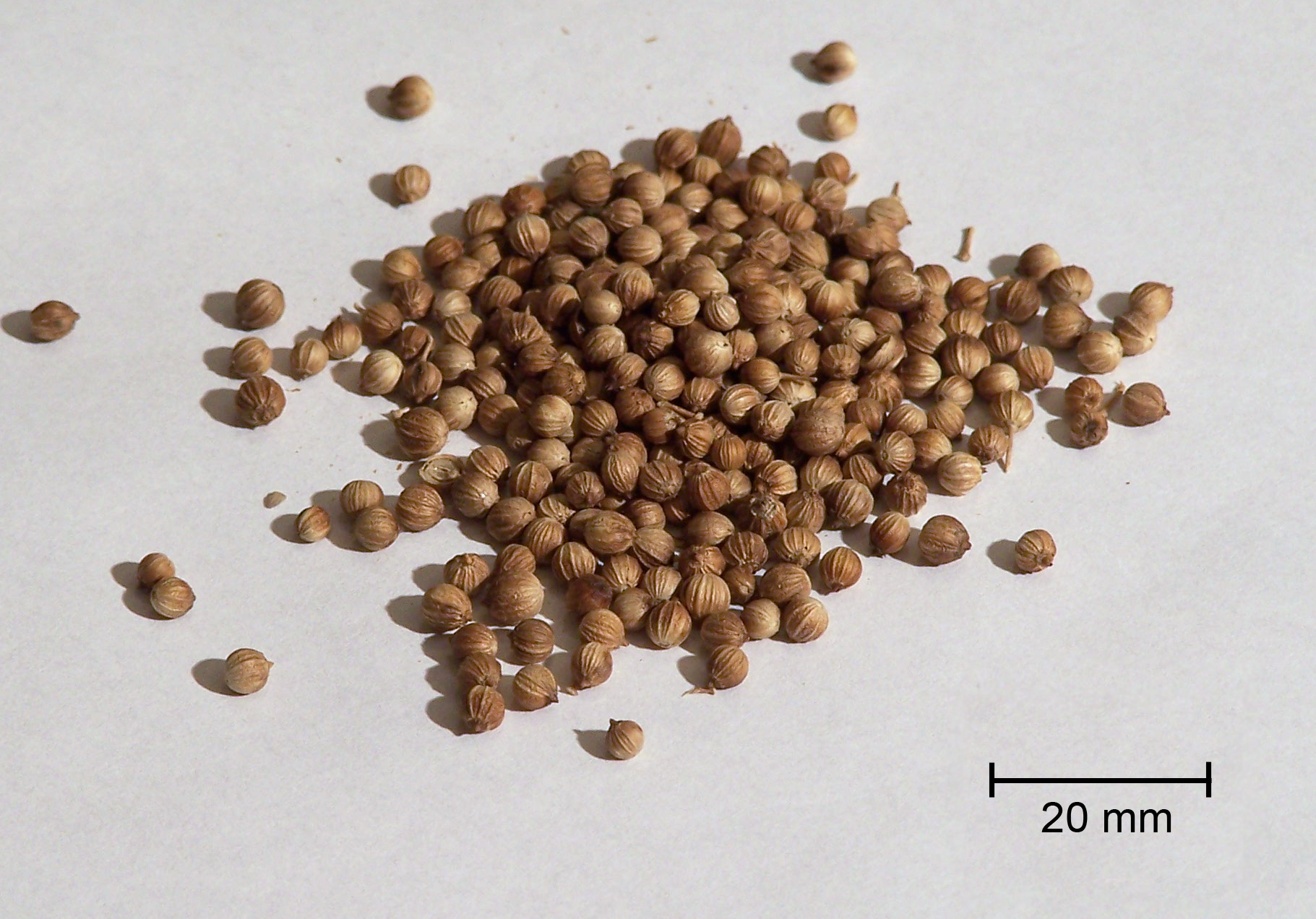
According to the book of Exodus, manna is like a coriander seed in size but is white (this is explained by ancient commentaries as a comparison to the round shape of the coriander seed).

Until they reached Canaan, the Israelites are implied by some passages in the Bible to have eaten only manna during their desert sojourn, despite the availability of milk and meat from the livestock with which they traveled, and the references to provisions of fine flour, oil, and meat, in parts of the journey's narrative.

As a natural food substance, manna would produce waste products; but in classical rabbinical literature, as a supernatural substance, it was held that manna produced no waste, resulting in no defecation among the Israelites until several decades later, when the manna had ceased to fall. Modern medical science suggests the lack of defecation over such a long period of time would cause severe bowel problems, especially when other food later began to be consumed again. Classical rabbinical writers say that the Israelites complained about the lack of defecation, and were concerned about potential bowel problems.

Many Christian vegetarians say that God had originally intended that man would not eat meat, because plants cannot move and killing them would not be sinful: manna, a non-meat substance, is used to support this theory. Further, when the people complained and wished for quail, God gave it to them, but they apparently still complained and some greedily gathered the quail. "While the meat was still between their teeth, before it was chewed, the anger of the Lord was kindled against the people."

Food was not manna's only use; one classical rabbinical source states that the fragrant odor of manna was used in a Jewish perfume.

== Gathering ==
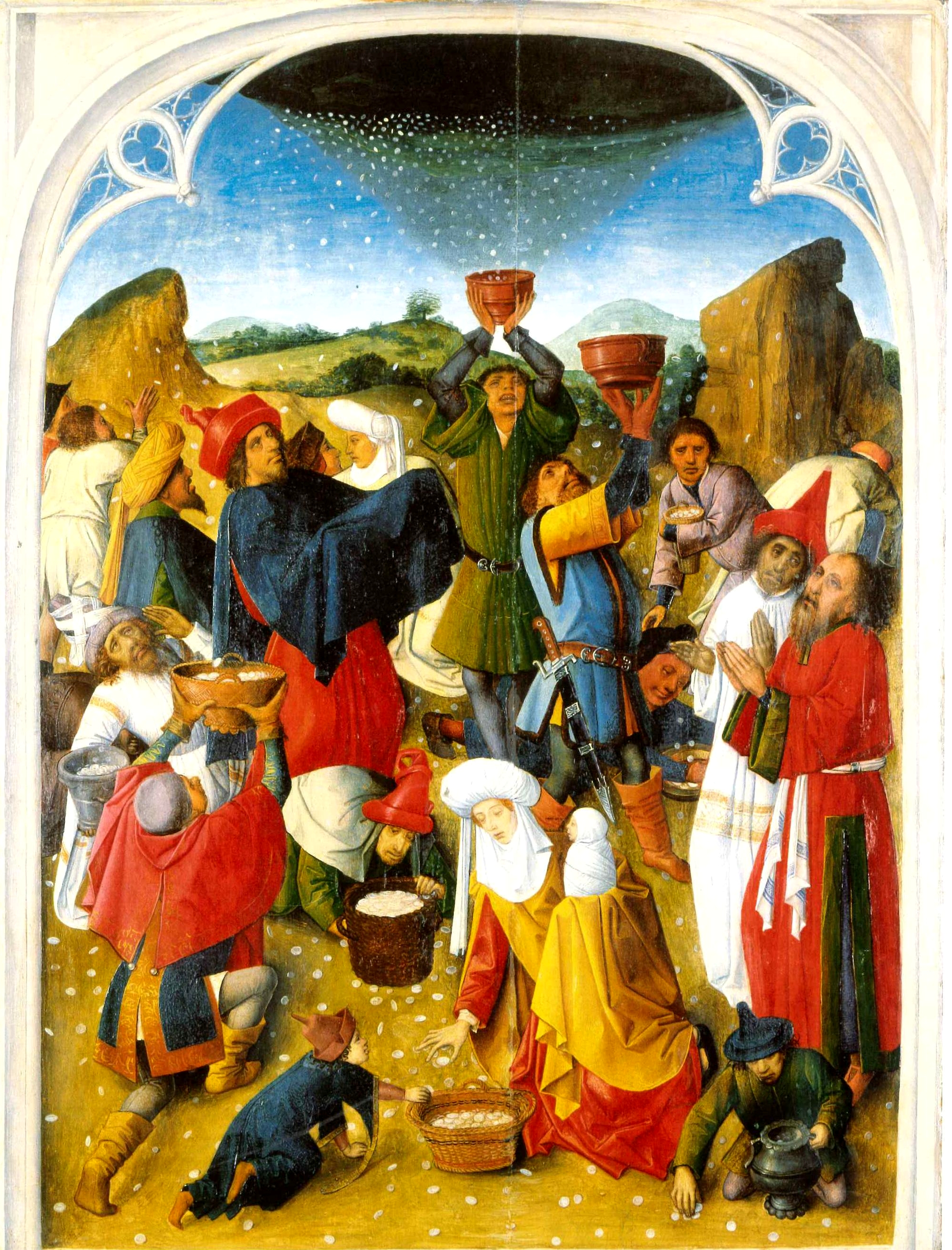
The Gathering of the Manna, c. 1460–1470.

Exodus says each day one omer of manna was gathered per family member (about 3.64 litres), and may imply this was regardless of how much effort was put into gathering it. A midrash attributed to Rabbi Tanhuma remarks that although some were diligent enough to go into the fields to gather manna, others just lay down lazily and caught it with their outstretched hands. The Talmud states that this factor was used to solve disputes about the ownership of slaves, since the number of omers of manna each household could gather would indicate how many people were legitimately part of the household. The omers of manna for stolen slaves could be gathered only by legitimate owners, and therefore legitimate owners would have spare omers of manna.

According to the Talmud, manna was found near the homes of those with strong belief in God, and far from the homes of those with doubts; indeed, one classical midrash says that manna was intangible to Gentiles, as it would inevitably slip from their hands. The Midrash Tanhuma holds that manna melted, formed liquid streams, was drunk by animals, flavored the animal flesh, and was thus indirectly eaten by Gentiles, this being the only way that Gentiles could taste manna.

Despite these hints of uneven distribution, classical rabbinical literature expresses the view that manna fell in very large quantities each day. It holds that manna was layered out over 2,000 cubits square, between 50 and 60 cubits in height, enough to nourish the Israelites for 2,000 years and to be seen from the palaces of every king in the East and West.

=== Sabbath ===
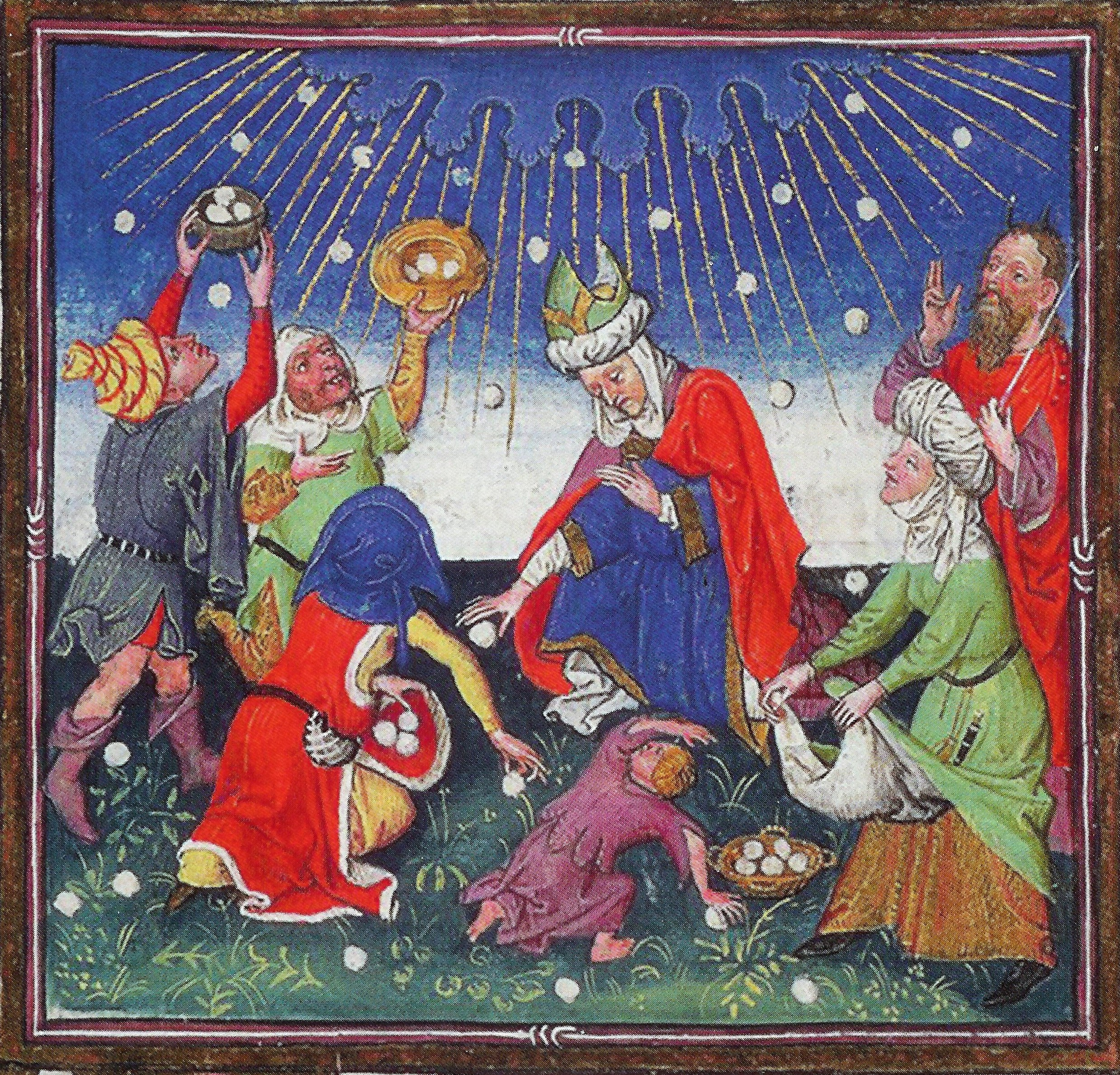
The Gathering of the Manna, a cropped image from Hours of Catherine of Cleves. Manuscript MS M. 917–945 ff 137v, Morgan Library & Museum, New York, around 1440.

According to Exodus, Shabbat (Sabbath) was reinstituted the first week manna appeared. It states that twice as much manna as usual was available on the sixth morning of the week, and none at all could be found on the seventh day; although manna usually rotted and became maggot-infested after a single night, that which had been collected on the sixth day remained fresh until the second night. Moses stated that the double portion of Preparation Day was to be consumed on Shabbat; and that God instructed him that no one should leave his place on Shabbat, so that the people could rest during it.

Form critics regard this part of the manna narrative to be spliced together from the Yahwist and Priestly traditions, with the Yahwist tradition emphasizing rest during Shabbat, while the Priestly tradition merely states that Shabbat exists, implying that the meaning of "Shabbat" was already known. These critics regard this part of the manna narrative as an etiological supernature story designed to explain the origin of Shabbat observance, which in reality was probably pre-Mosaic.

== Duration of supply ==
Exodus states that the Israelites consumed the manna for 40 years, starting from the fifteenth day of the second month (Iyar 15), but that it then ceased to appear once they had reached a settled land, and once they had reached the borders of Canaan (inhabited by the Canaanites). Form critics attribute this variation to the view that each expression of the manna ceasing derives from different lore; the "settled land" is attributed to the Priestly tradition, and "Canaan's borders" to the Yahwist tradition, or to a hypothetical later redaction to synchronize the account with that of the Book of Joshua, which states that the manna ceased to appear on the day after the annual Passover festival (Nisan 14), when the Israelites had reached Gilgal. The duration from Iyar 15 to Nisan 14, taken literally, is forty years less one month.

There is also a disagreement among classical rabbinical writers as to when the manna ceased, particularly in regard to whether it remained after the death of Moses for a further 40 days, 70 days, or 14 years; indeed, according to Joshua ben Levi, the manna ceased to appear at the moment that Moses died.

Despite the eventual termination of the supply of manna, Exodus states that a small amount of it survived within an omer-sized pot or jar, which was kept facing the Testimony (possibly, adjacent to the Ark of the Covenant); it indicates that God instructed this of Moses, who delegated it to Aaron. The Epistle to the Hebrews states that the pot was stored inside the Ark. Classical rabbinical sources believe the pot was made of gold; some say it was only there for the generation following Moses, and others that it survived at least until the time of Jeremiah. However, the First Book of Kings states that it was absent earlier than Jeremiah, during Solomon's reign in the tenth century B.C. Form critics attribute the mention of the pot to the Priestly tradition, concluding that the pot existed in the early sixth century B.C.

== Later cultural references ==
By extension, "manna" has been used to refer to any divine or spiritual nourishment.

At the Basilica di San Nicola in Bari, Italy, there is an annual ceremony of collecting a clear liquid from the tomb of Saint Nicholas; legend credits the pleasant perfume of this liquid with warding off evil, and it is sold to pilgrims as "the Manna of Saint Nicholas". The liquid gradually seeps out of the tomb, but it is unclear whether it originates from the body within the tomb, or from the marble itself; since the town of Bari is a harbor, and the tomb is below sea level, there are several natural explanations for the manna fluid, including the transfer of seawater to the tomb by capillary action.

In the 17th century, a woman marketed a clear, tasteless product as a cosmetic, "the Manna of Saint Nicholas of Bari". After the deaths of some 600 men, Italian authorities discovered that the alleged cosmetic was a preparation of arsenic, used by their wives.

Robert Nozick references "manna from heaven" in a thought experiment about distributive justice.

In a modern botanical context, manna is often used to refer to the secretions of various plants, especially of certain shrubs and trees, and in particular the sugars obtained by evaporating the sap of the manna ash, extracted by making small cuts in the bark. The manna ash, native to Southern Europe and Southwest Asia, produces a blue-green sap, which has medicinal value as a mild laxative, demulcent, and weak expectorant.

The names of both the sugar mannose and its hydrogenated sugar alcohol, mannitol, are derived from manna.

=== Manna in medicine ===
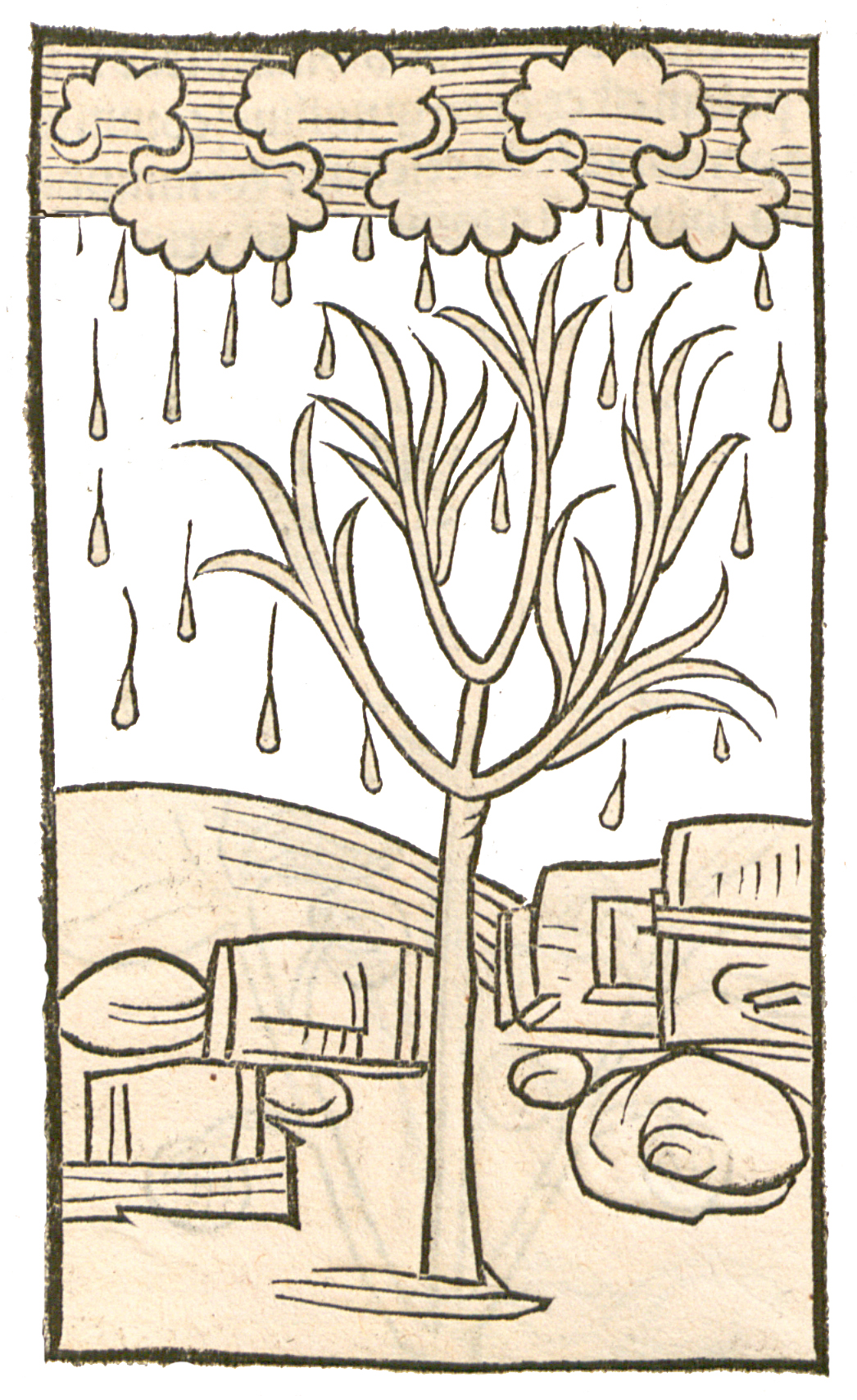
Hortus sanitatis, Mainz 1491. Woodcut showing manna

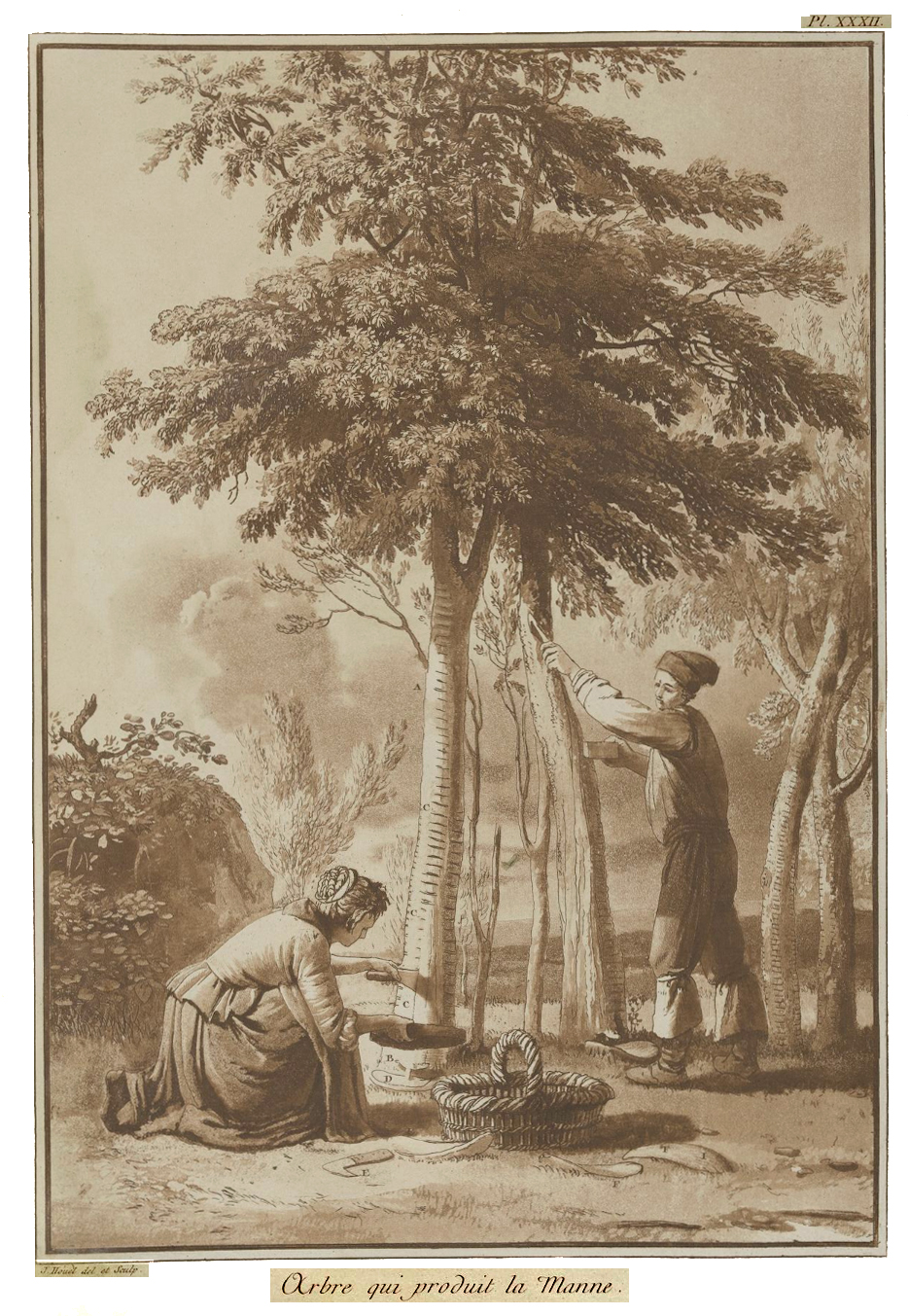
Jean-Pierre Houël 1782. Collection of manna in Cinisi

Greek and Latin physicians and encyclopedists of the 1st century AD (Dioskurides and Plinius) held manna for crumbs of Frankincense, fallen from Boswellia sacra.

Starting with Avicenna, the physicians of the Arabian and Latin Middle Ages held that manna was a dew (ros) falling on stones and trees, and that it was sweet like honey. This manna was believed to incorporate the nature of whatever it fell upon. Its virtues were to soften the abdomen, eradicate acute fever, and to be useful to the chest and lungs as well as to the choleric and hot natures.

==== References in medieval Muslim works ====
- Avicenna 10th–11th century
- Constantine the African 11th century
- Circa instans 12th century
- Pseudo-Serapion 13th century
- Ibn al-Baitar 13th century

==== References in medieval Christian works ====
- Conrad of Megenberg 14th century
- Herbarius moguntinus 1484
- Gart der Gesundheit 1485
- Hortus sanitatis 1491

In 1586 the German physician Joachim Camerarius the Younger wrote in his herbal, that manna, that was used to purge humours, was collected in Welschland from species of Fraxinus. In the same article he showed a woodcut of Fraxinus excelsior. A woodcut of Fraxinus ornus had been published earlier in 1554 and in 1562 by Pietro Andrea Mattioli.

Until the end of the 19th century, manna was brought to Northern Europe from Calabria (manna calabrina) and from Sicilia. It was collected as a secrete from species of Fraxinus, mainly of Fraxinus ornus and of Fraxinus excelsior. Following the rules of Humorisme, physicians in Northern Europe prescribed this manna as a mild laxative.

==== References in the 17th and 18th centuries ====
- Pierre Pomet. Histoire générale des drogues ... 1694. – Nicolas Lemery. Dictionnaire universel des drogues simples ... 1699. – Joseph Pitton de Tournefort 1717 – Pomet – Lémery – Tournefort
- Lettere del signor abate Domenico Sestini ... 1780. – Jean-Pierre Houël. Voyage pittoresque des isles de Sicile ... 1782.
- Johann Andreas Murray. Apparatus Medicaminum ... 1784.
- William Cullen. A treatise of the materia medica ... 1789.

== See also ==
- Alhagi maurorum
- Ambrosia and Amrita
- Bread of Life Discourse
- Gum arabic
- Golden calf
- The Manna Machine
- Soma and haoma, sacraments of the Rigveda and Zoroastrian canons, respectively
