= Trabutina =

Scientific classification
- Kingdom: Animalia
- Phylum: Arthropoda
- Class: Insecta
- Order: Hemiptera
- Suborder: Sternorrhyncha
- Family: Pseudococcidae
- Genus: Trabutina

Genus of true bugs

Trabutina is a genus of "blue-green" mealybugs, containing five species: T. crassispinosa, T. elastica, T. mannipara, T. serpentina, and T. tenax. This genus of scale insects feeds solely on plants of the genus Tamarix. Its type species is T. mannipara.

Trabutina insects produce a sweet excretion which is used as a food in Israel and Iraq. Polyrhachis simplex, a species of weaver ants, also feeds on the sugary secretions.
