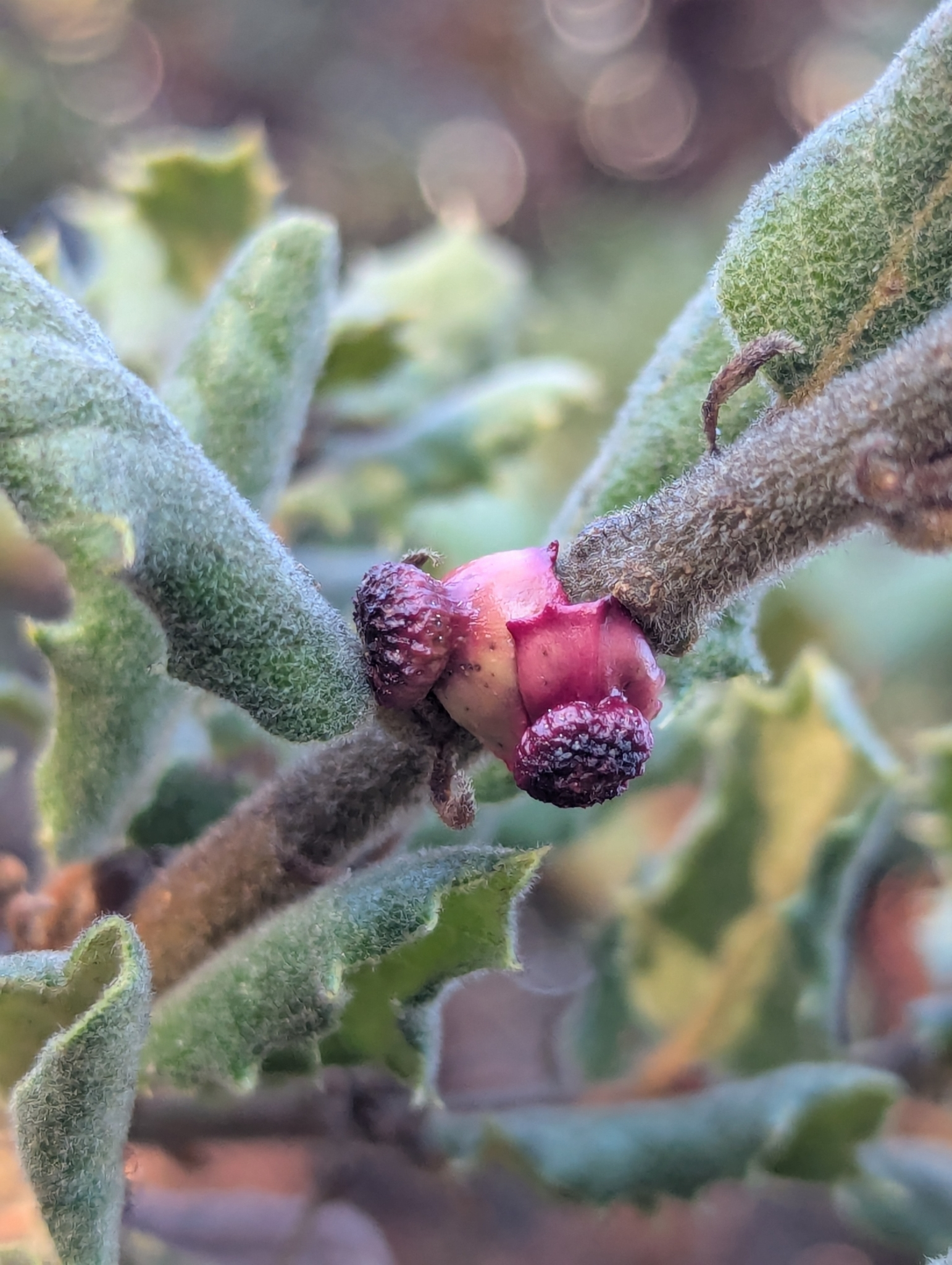
- The gall formed by the asexual generation of D. prehensa, on the leaf of Quercus durata, San Mateo County, 2025

Scientific classification
- Kingdom: Animalia
- Phylum: Arthropoda
- Class: Insecta
- Order: Hymenoptera
- Family: Cynipidae
- Genus: Disholcaspis
- Species: D. prehensa

Binomial name
- Disholcaspis prehensa Weld, 1957

= Disholcaspis prehensa =

Species of wasp

Disholcaspis prehensa, also known as the clasping twig gall wasp, is a species of gall-inducing wasp. It is native to California, where it induces galls on both scrub oak and leather oak.

== Life cycle ==
The life cycle of Disholcaspis prehensa alternates between an asexual (agamic) generation and a sexual generation, producing two different types of galls at different seasons of the year.

In the spring, females from the previous sexual generation oviposit in young twig tissue, forming conspicuous mushroom-shaped galls which mature by early summer. The base of each gall has sharp edges and broadly wraps around the twig it rests on, giving rise to the common name, clasping twig gall wasp. The galls are 7–10 mm high and around 10 mm wide at the base. They tend to be more red in color on the sun-facing side, and more yellow on the shaded side, eventually browning with age. The larvae are housed in an elliptical chamber at the base of the gall, and they emerge from the sides as adults in late winter or early spring.

The adults that emerge are all female, and they reproduce parthenogenetically, laying their eggs into the dormant leaf buds of the California scrub oak. The new galls develop the next spring as the oak's leaves begin to open. Unlike the galls of the asexual generation, these spring galls remain hidden within the bud. They are only 2.2–3.5 mm and oblong, with a light brown color. By late spring, the new sexual generation emerges from holes near the apices of their respective galls. At this stage, the adult males and females will mate to begin the cycle again.

== Ecology ==
The young agamic galls often induce the host tree to exude a honeydew-like phloem sap that attracts ants, yellowjackets, and bees. Ants in particular are believed to protect the developing larvae from parasitoid wasps.
