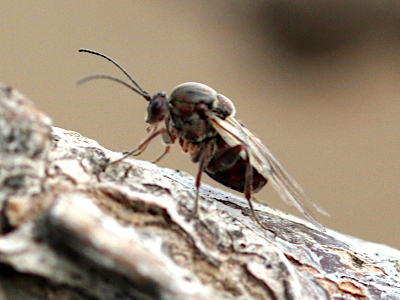
- Winged adult
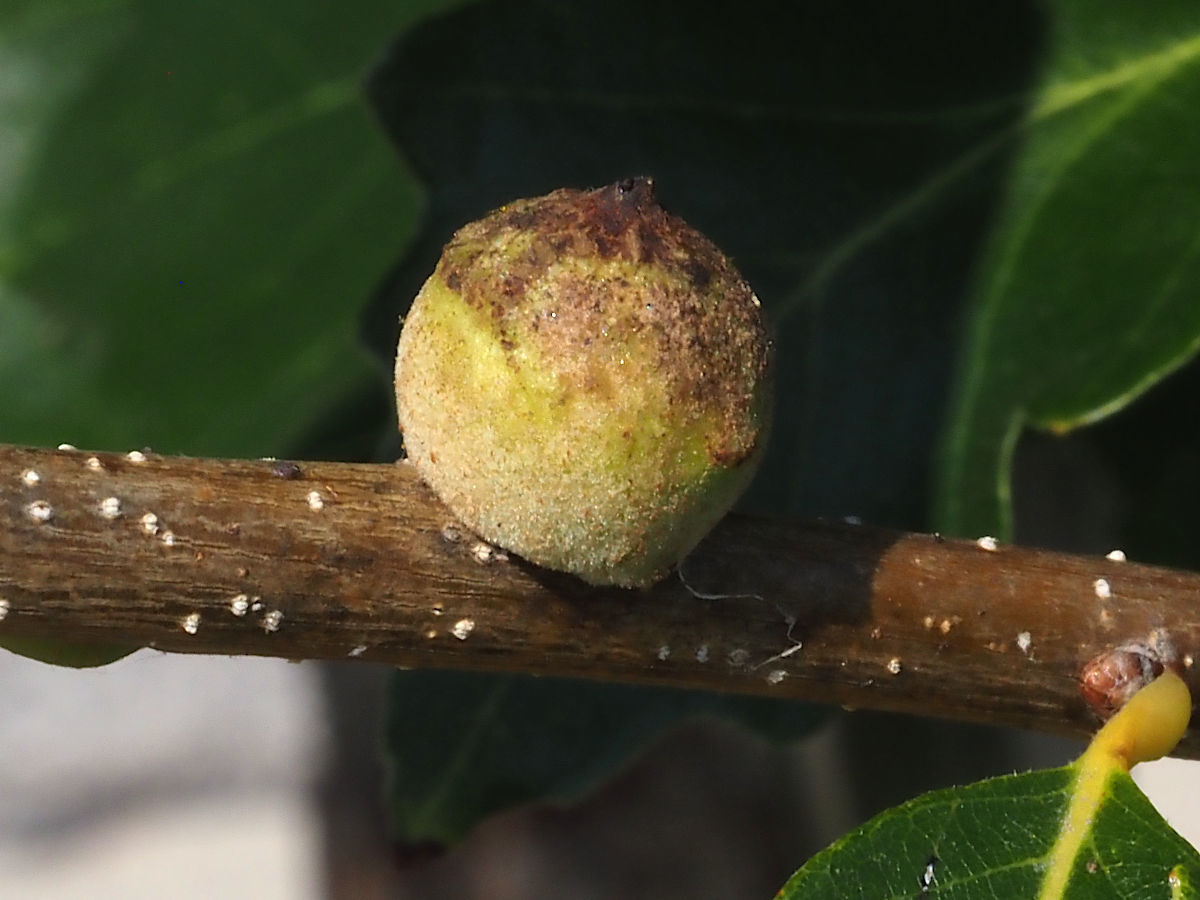
- Bullet gall

Scientific classification
- Kingdom: Animalia
- Phylum: Arthropoda
- Clade: Pancrustacea
- Class: Insecta
- Order: Hymenoptera
- Family: Cynipidae
- Genus: Disholcaspis
- Species: D. quercusmamma

Binomial name
- Disholcaspis quercusmamma (Walsh and Riley, 1869)

= Disholcaspis quercusmamma =

Species of wasp

Disholcaspis quercusmamma, the oak rough bulletgall wasp, is a species of gall wasp in the family Cynipidae. The quercus in its name is the genus name for oak, while "mamma" is Latin for "breast", presumably a reference to the "nipple" on the gall.

The galls formed by several species in the Disholcaspis genus are called "bullet galls" due to their shape and size. Disholcaspis quercusmamma galls are similar in appearance to those formed by Disholcaspis quercusglobulus; the distinguishing characters are a velvety surface and pointed apex ("nipple").

The host plants are white oaks, including bur oak, swamp white oak, and overcup oak.

== Life cycle ==
As in all Hymenoptera, sex-determination in Disholcaspis quercusmamma is governed by haplodiploidy: males develop from unfertilized eggs and are haploid, and females develop from fertilized eggs and are diploid.

The life cycle of Disholcaspis quercusmamma alternates between an asexual (agamic) generation and a sexual generation, producing two different types of galls at different seasons of the year.

=== Asexual generation ===
The conspicuous bullet galls seen in summer and fall contain only female larvae. When mature, female adults emerge in late fall and reproduce parthenogenetically.

The females are self-fertile and lay a single egg in a dormant leaf bud. These eggs along with the resulting wasp larvae stimulate the tree to produce small, inconspicuous leaf galls in the spring.

=== Sexual generation ===
Both male and female wasps develop inside the spring leaf galls and adults emerge in mid-to-late spring.

The mated females fly or crawl to newly elongated twigs where they insert their eggs through the phloem to be in contact with the cambium, where undifferentiated (meristematic) cells are stimulated to grow the fall bullet galls.

== Ecology ==
The larva within the gall can be parasitized by parasitoid wasps, including Sycophila dubia (Eurytomidae), Torymus denticulatus (Torymidae), Mesopolobus sp. and Pteromalus sp. (Pteromalidae).

The bullet gall can induce the host tree to exude a honeydew-like sweet material that fosters growth of sooty mold. This extrafloral nectar attracts stinging insects such as bald-faced hornets and yellowjackets as well as biting insects such as carpenter ants, perhaps offering protection of the developing female wasp larva in the gall.

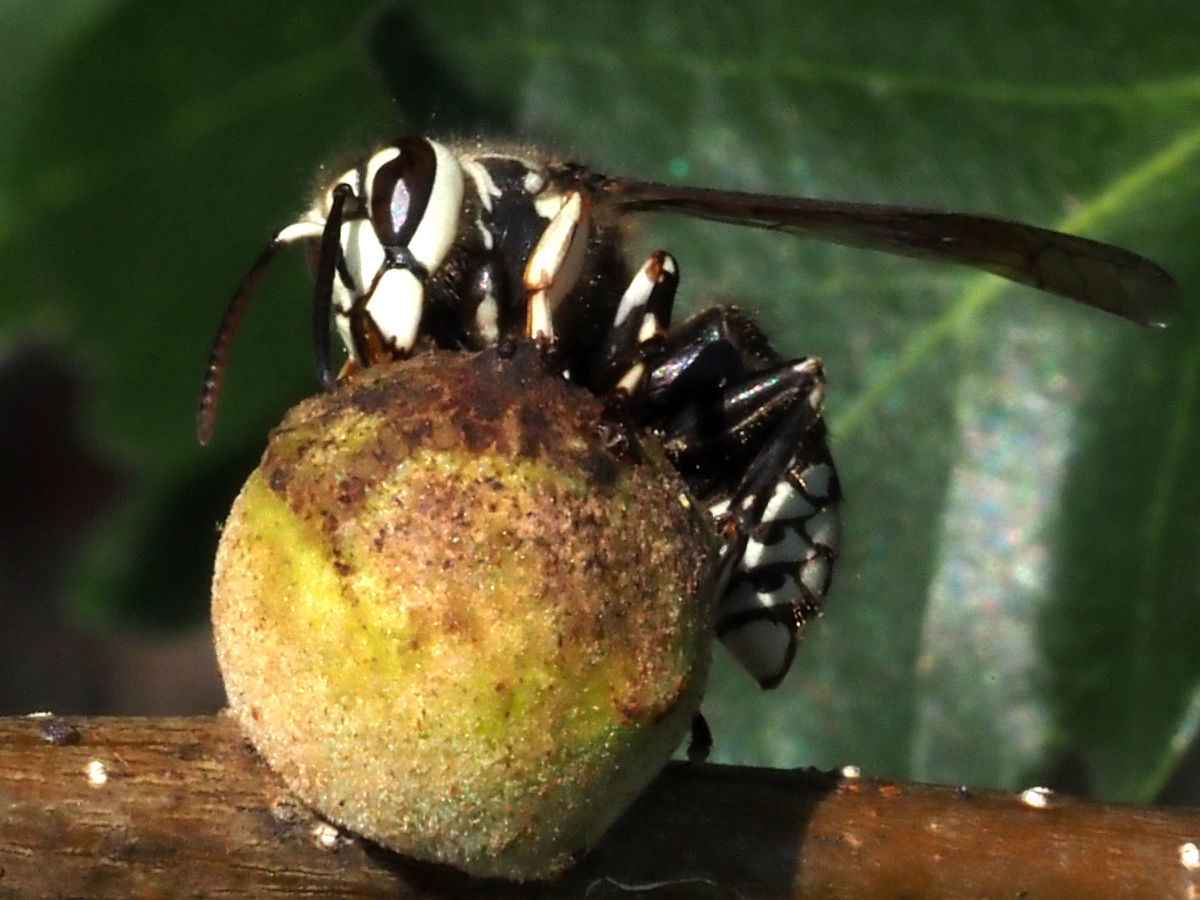
A bald-faced hornet sips nectar from a gall
