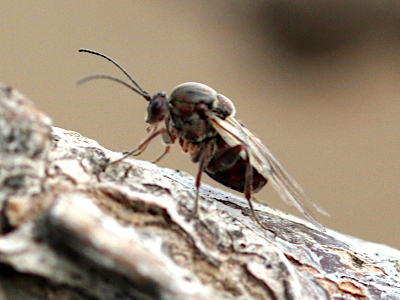
- Adult Disholcaspis quercusmamma

Scientific classification
- Kingdom: Animalia
- Phylum: Arthropoda
- Class: Insecta
- Order: Hymenoptera
- Family: Cynipidae
- Tribe: Cynipini
- Genus: Disholcaspis; Dalla Torre & Kieffer, 1910

Type species
- Callispidia quercus-globulus Fitch, 1859

= Disholcaspis =

Genus of gall wasps

Disholcaspis is a genus of gall wasps in the family Cynipidae. There are more than 40 species described in the genus Disholcaspis. Some Disholcaspis species induce galls that produce honeydew, a sweet liquid that attracts yellow jackets, ants, and bees. These insects then protect the galls from parasitic wasps.

== Species ==
These 42 species belong to the genus Disholcaspis:

- Disholcaspis acetabula (Weld, 1921)
- Disholcaspis bassetti (Gillette, 1888)
- Disholcaspis bettyannae Medianero & Nieves-Aldrey, 2011
- Disholcaspis bisethiae Medianero & Nieves-Aldrey, 2011
- Disholcaspis brevinota Weld, 1921
- Disholcaspis canescens Weld, 1957 - Round honeydew gall wasp
- Disholcaspis cinerosa (Bassett, 1881) - Mealy oak gall wasp
- Disholcaspis colorado Gillette, 1893
- Disholcaspis costaricensis Melika & Pujade-Villar, 2021
- Disholcaspis crystalae Pujade-Villar, 2018
- Disholcaspis edura Weld, 1957
- Disholcaspis eldoradensis (Beutenmuller, 1909) - Honeydew gall wasp
- Disholcaspis erugomamma Cooke-McEwen & Gates, 2020
- Disholcaspis fungiformis Kinsey, 1920
- Disholcaspis globosa Weld, 1921
- Disholcaspis insulana Kinsey, 1938
- Disholcaspis lacuna Weld, 1921
- Disholcaspis laetae Kinsey, 1937
- Disholcaspis largior Kinsey, 1938
- Disholcaspis mamillana Weld, 1957
- Disholcaspis mellifica Pujade-Villar, 2017
- Disholcaspis mexicana Weld, 1957
- Disholcaspis pallens Kinsey, 1938
- Disholcaspis pattersoni Kinsey, 1922
- Disholcaspis pedunculoides Weld, 1926
- Disholcaspis perniciosa (Bassett, 1890)
- Disholcaspis potosina Kinsey, 1937
- Disholcaspis prehensa Weld, 1957 - Clasping twig gall wasp
- Disholcaspis pruniformis Kinsey, 1920
- Disholcaspis pulla Kinsey, 1937
- Disholcaspis purlans Kinsey, 1937
- Disholcaspis purpurea Kinsey, 1937
- Disholcaspis quercusglobulus (Fitch, 1859) - Round bullet gall wasp
- Disholcaspis quercusmamma (Walsh, 1869) - Oak rough bulletgall wasp
- Disholcaspis quercusomnivora Weld, 1959
- Disholcaspis quercusvirens (Ashmead, 1881)
- Disholcaspis regina Kinsey, 1937
- Disholcaspis rubens (Gillette, 1893)
- Disholcaspis simulata Kinsey, 1922 - Dried peach gall wasp
- Disholcaspis spissa Weld, 1957
- Disholcaspis spongiosa Weld, 1926
- Disholcaspis terrestris Weld
