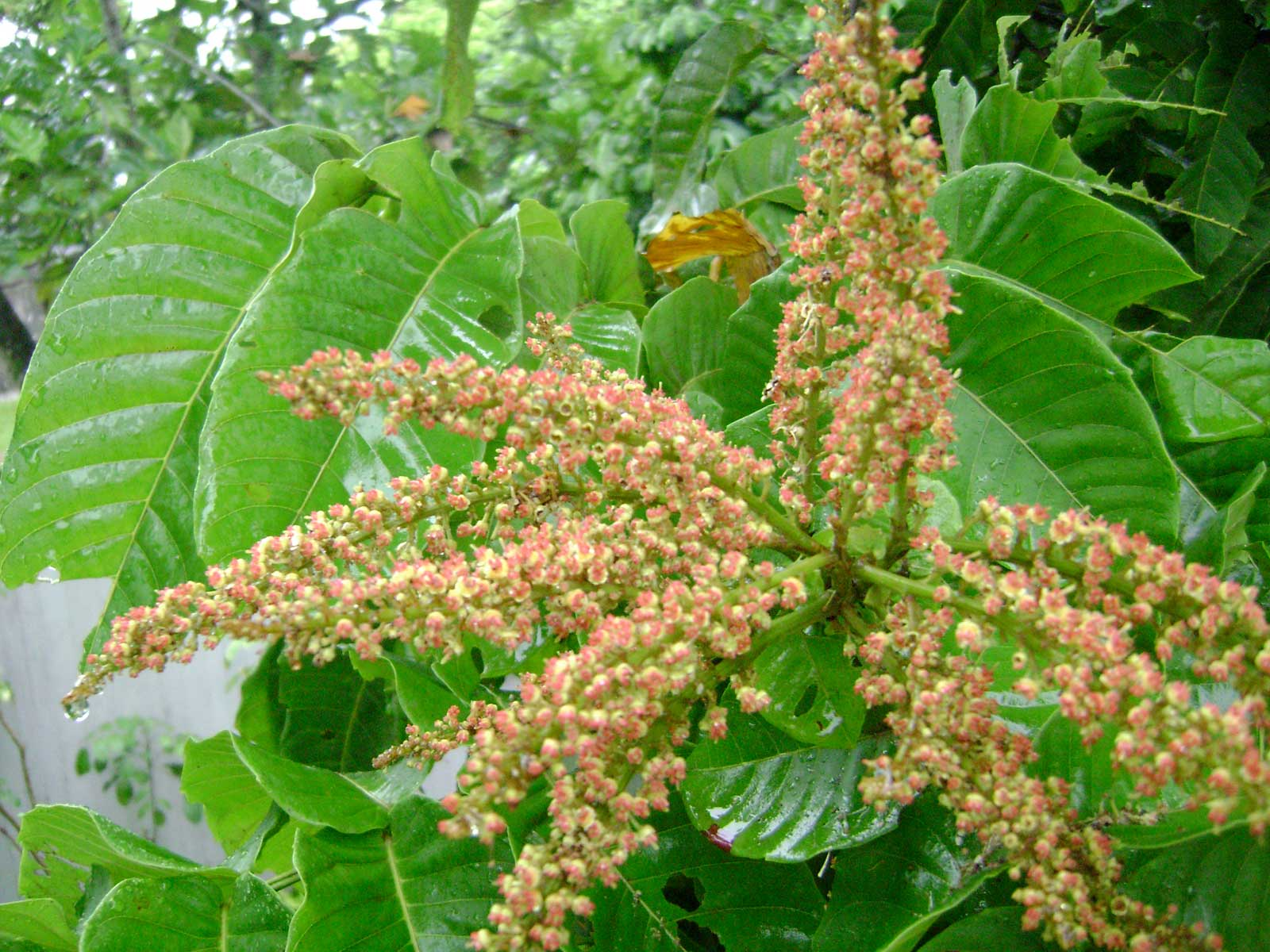
- In flower, Tonga
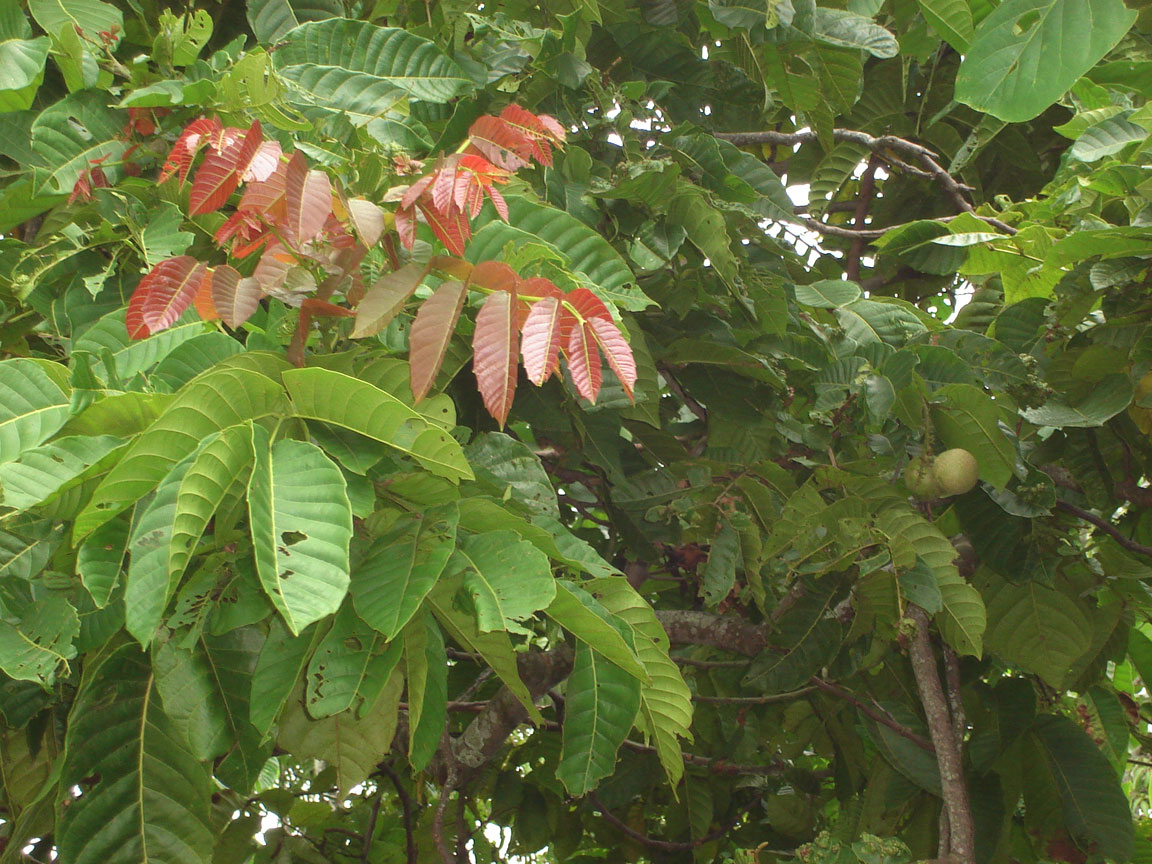
- New growth and developing fruit

Conservation status
- Least Concern (IUCN 3.1)

Scientific classification
- Kingdom: Plantae
- Clade: Embryophytes
- Clade: Tracheophytes
- Clade: Spermatophytes
- Clade: Angiosperms
- Clade: Eudicots
- Clade: Rosids
- Order: Sapindales
- Family: Sapindaceae
- Genus: Pometia
- Species: P. pinnata

Binomial name
- Pometia pinnata J.R.Forst. and G.Forst.

= Pometia pinnata =

Species of tree

The Pometia pinnata is a tropical hardwood tree species that is widespread in the Pacific and Southeast Asian regions. The tree species has many common names, including matoa, tava (in Samoa and Tonga), taun tree, Island lychee and Pacific lychee. The species comes from the Sapindaceae family and comes from the clades of Tracheophytes, Angiosperms, and the order Sapindales.

== Characteristics ==
The hardwood tree species occurs and grows in a wide variety of habitats and vegetation. The size of the tree varies, ranging from 12–20 metres (39–66 ft) tall with a 10–20 m (33–66 ft) wide canopy. The tree grows an average of 1–2 m (3.3–6.6 ft) per year. Its canopy is made up of lush, evergreen leaves that create wide coverage.

Pometia pinnata is a fruiting and flowering species, and it produces white to green-yellow flowers. The male and female flowers are similar in size and color, so it is hard to differentiate between them. They grow in long stalks, 2–2.5 millimetres (0.08–0.10 in) in length, and produce flowers that can potentially fruit. The fruiting process takes 2–3 months and the fruit is green-yellow when developing. They are under developed when the fruit is tough and fleshy. When it is ripe and edible, the fruit will turn red-black in color, and become softer in texture. The species is also self-pruning, and can reproduce rapidly even in tropical forests.

== Habitat and range ==
Pometia pinnata is a widespread type of timber tree species. The species originated from Sri Lanka and the Andaman Islands through Southeast Asia. The pinnata species also inhabits New Guinea and other Pacific islands. It grows naturally in warm to hot, humid subtropical and tropical zones, with a typical elevation of 0–500 m (0–1,640 ft). The trees need an annual rainfall of 1,500–5,000 mm (59–197 in). The species has a natural, native range in the Asian-Pacific region of the globe. The Tava species is native throughout the island of Borneo. The plant species has a range of distribution that keeps growing, but not invasive. It is modernly distributed to New Caledonia, eastern Polynesia, and the North Pacific islands, like Hawaiʻi.

== Possible benefits and threats ==
Residents of the Pacific islands benefit from the fruiting tree. They are able to collect the freshly produced fruit from the trees and collect timber for logging and trades. Pometia pinnata has a very low invasive potential, and the species spreads and distributes naturally throughout the Pacific Islands. The only other possible threat to the species is a risk of defoliation in specific regions of the South Pacific. Meaning that its leaves could suffer from a shot-holed appearance. It does not necessarily kill the trees, but does occur when the tree is becoming fully mature.

== Protection ==
Efforts are made in many tropical countries to maintain high populations of this species. Papua New Guinea's constitution protects all aspects of wildlife and nature, including Pometia pinnata. In other locations of this species, the trees are protected as well. The species is a major resource to its countries of origin and will be protected as an asset.
