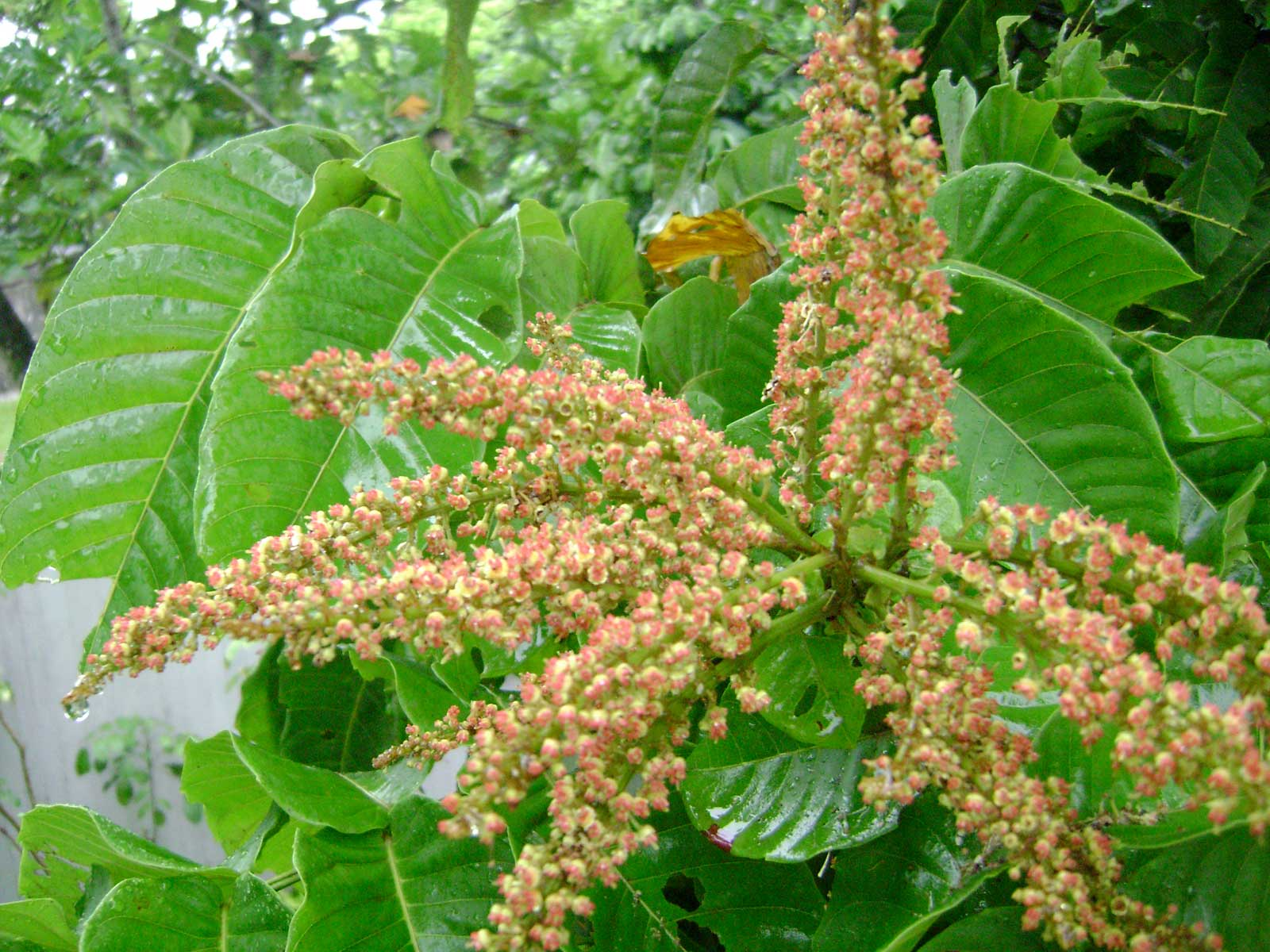
- Pometia pinnata

Scientific classification
- Kingdom: Plantae
- Clade: Tracheophytes
- Clade: Angiosperms
- Clade: Eudicots
- Clade: Rosids
- Order: Sapindales
- Family: Sapindaceae
- Tribe: Nephelieae
- Genus: Pometia; J.R.Forst. & G.Forst

Type species
- Pometia pinnata J.R.Forst. & G.Forst.

Synonyms
- Cnesmocarpus Zipp. ex Blume; Dabanus Kuntze; Diplocardia Zipp. ex Blume; Eccremanthus Thwaites; Irina Blume; Irine Hassk.

= Pometia (plant) =

Genus of flowering plants

Pometia is a genus of 2 species of rainforest trees, constituting part of the plant family Sapindaceae.

== Description ==
They are large trees, which are monoecious, usually with buttress roots, with red exudate (substance like resin, pouring out of the trunk) when cut. The leaves are paripinnate, arranged alternate, sessile (without stalk). The leaflets are usually in many pairs, with the first pair (near base) small, like stipules, others evidently larger, usually serrate. The leaves have many lateral veins, extending to tips of dentate margins and parallel. The thyrses (flower on the branch) is terminal (at the end) or axillary (on a leaf joint). The flowers are unisexual and actinomorphic (radially symmetrical). The calyx is cupular (cup shaped). The sepals are half connate and valvate. It has 5 petals, usually broadly obovate or subtriangular, without scales or with 1 gland adaxially. The (flower) disk is annular and 5-lobed. It has 5 stamens (or male flowers) which are long exserted. The filaments are glabrous or hairy at base. The anthers are small. The ovary (or female flowers) is obcordiform, 2-lobed and 2-loculed. The lobes subglobose, glabrous or tomentose. They are 1 ovule per locule. The style is filiform (thread-like) and very long, with a twisted apex. The fruit is deeply parted into 2 schizocarps (dry fruits), usually with only 1 developed, ellipsoid. The pericarp (wall of the fruit) is thick, spongy in middle and smooth adaxially. The seeds are the same shape as schizocarps. The testa (seed coating) is leathery and the seeds are fully covered by an aril and adnate to testa. It has a curved embryo.

== Taxonomy ==
The genus name of Pometia is in honour of Pierre Pomet (1658–1699), a French pharmacist. It was first described and published in Char. Gen. Pl. on page 109 in 1776.

== Known species ==
According to Kew;

- Pometia pinnata J.R.Forst. & G.Forst.
- Pometia ridleyi King

== Range and habitat ==
They grow naturally in tropical and subtropical Asia and in the South Pacific. It is found in mainland southern China, Hainan and Taiwan islands, Sri Lanka, the Andaman Islands, Laos, Myanmar, Nicobar Islands, Thailand, Vietnam, Borneo, Java, Lesser Sunda Islands, Malaya, Maluku, Philippines, Sulawesi and Sumatera, (of Southeast Asia), the Bismarck Archipelago, New Guinea and the Solomon Islands, (of Papuasia), Fiji, (island of) Niue, Samoa, Santa Cruz Islands, Tonga, Tuamotu, Vanuatu and Wallis-Futuna Islands (all in the Pacific Ocean).

It was later introduced into the Cook Islands, Marquesas Islands (Polynesia) and the Marshall Islands.

They are found in rainforests, and monsoon forests.
