= Trabutina mannipara =

Scientific classification
- Kingdom: Animalia
- Phylum: Arthropoda
- Clade: Pancrustacea
- Class: Insecta
- Order: Hemiptera
- Suborder: Sternorrhyncha
- Family: Pseudococcidae
- Genus: Trabutina
- Species: T. mannipara

Binomial name
- Trabutina mannipara (Hemprich & Ehrenberg, 1829)

Synonyms
- Coccus manniparus Hemprich & Ehrenberg, 1829; Ceroplastes manniparus (Hemprich & Ehrenberg, 1829); Gossyparia manniparus (Hemprich & Ehrenberg, 1829); Eriococcus manniparus (Hemprich & Ehrenberg, 1829); Trabutina leonardii Sivestri 1920; Trabutina palestina Bodenheimer 1927; Trabutina bogdanovikatjkovi Borchsenius 1941

Species of insect

Trabutina mannipara, or mana scale, is a species of mealybug found in the Middle East and southern Europe. It is the most well-known of the five species in the genus Trabutina, of which it is the type species, due to its association with the biblical story of manna. T. mannipara feeds parasitically on tamarisk trees, and excretes a sweet substance which is sometimes collected for human consumption. Obsolete terms for it include Coccus manniparus and Trabutina palestina. (Note: Trabutina Palestina, described in 1927, was later discovered to be the same species.) This species can be found in the Sinai and Iraq.

It was described in 1829 by Hemprich and Ehrenberg (as Coccus manniparus), after investigation in the Sinai mountains. Ehrenberg believed that the bite wounds in the tamarisk plant created as the insects fed on the plant caused a sweet sticky substance known locally as "manna", and which Ehrenberg associated with the biblical manna, to flow out of the plant. In 1929, F. S. Bodenheimer found that the manna was in fact produced by the insects themselves, and argued that the description of the sticky substance and its geographical region argued in favor of Ehrenberg's identification with the biblical manna. The identification with biblical manna continues to appear in more recent literature.

T. mannipara, like other mealybugs, is parasitic on plants, and in its excretions is a great deal of undigested material. In the case of mannipara, these excretions are high in sugar.

In the United States, where tamarisks are invasive species, T. mannipara has been tested for possible use in controlling tamarisks.
