= Blue-green mealybugs =

Group of true bugs

"Blue-green" mealybugs are a group of related mealybug genera whose insides, during adulthood, are usually of the color which gives them their collective name. Alternately, this group may be referred to as blue-black mealybugs. It includes the genera Amonostherium, Australicoccus, Melanococus, and Nipaecoccus.

While the exact relationships between various scale insects are often contested, one suggestion is to class all (and only) the blue-green mealybugs in the sub-family Trabutininae.

== Bibliography ==
- Downie, D. A.; Gullan, P. J. (2004). "Phylogenetic Analysis of Mealybugs (Hemiptera: Coccoidae: Pseudococcidae) Based on DNA sequences from Three Nuclear Genes, and a Review of the Higher Classification". Systematic Entomology. 29 (2): 238–259. Bibcode:2004SysEn..29..238D. doi:10.1111/j.0307-6970.2004.00241.x. S2CID 55777004.
- Mani, M. (2016). "Taxonomy". In M. Mani; C. Shivaraju (eds.). Mealybugs and their Management in Agricultural and Horticultural crops. Springer India. ISBN 978-81-322-2677-2.
- McKenzie, Howard Lester (1967). Mealybugs of California: With Taxonomy, Biology, and Control of North American Species (Homoptera, Coccoidea, Pseudococcidae). University of California Press. p. 52. GGKEY:QPJX206YQYC.
- Thao, MyLo Ly; Gullan, Penny J.; Baumann, Paul (2002). "Secondary (γ-Proteobacteria) Endosymbionts Infect the Primary (β-Proteobacteria) Endosymbionts of Mealybugs Multiple Times and Coevolve with Their Hosts". Applied and Environmental Microbiology. 68 (7). American Society for Microbiology: 3190–3197. Bibcode:2002ApEnM..68.3190T. doi:10.1128/aem.68.7.3190-3197.2002. PMC 126777. PMID 12088994. S2CID 6094472.
