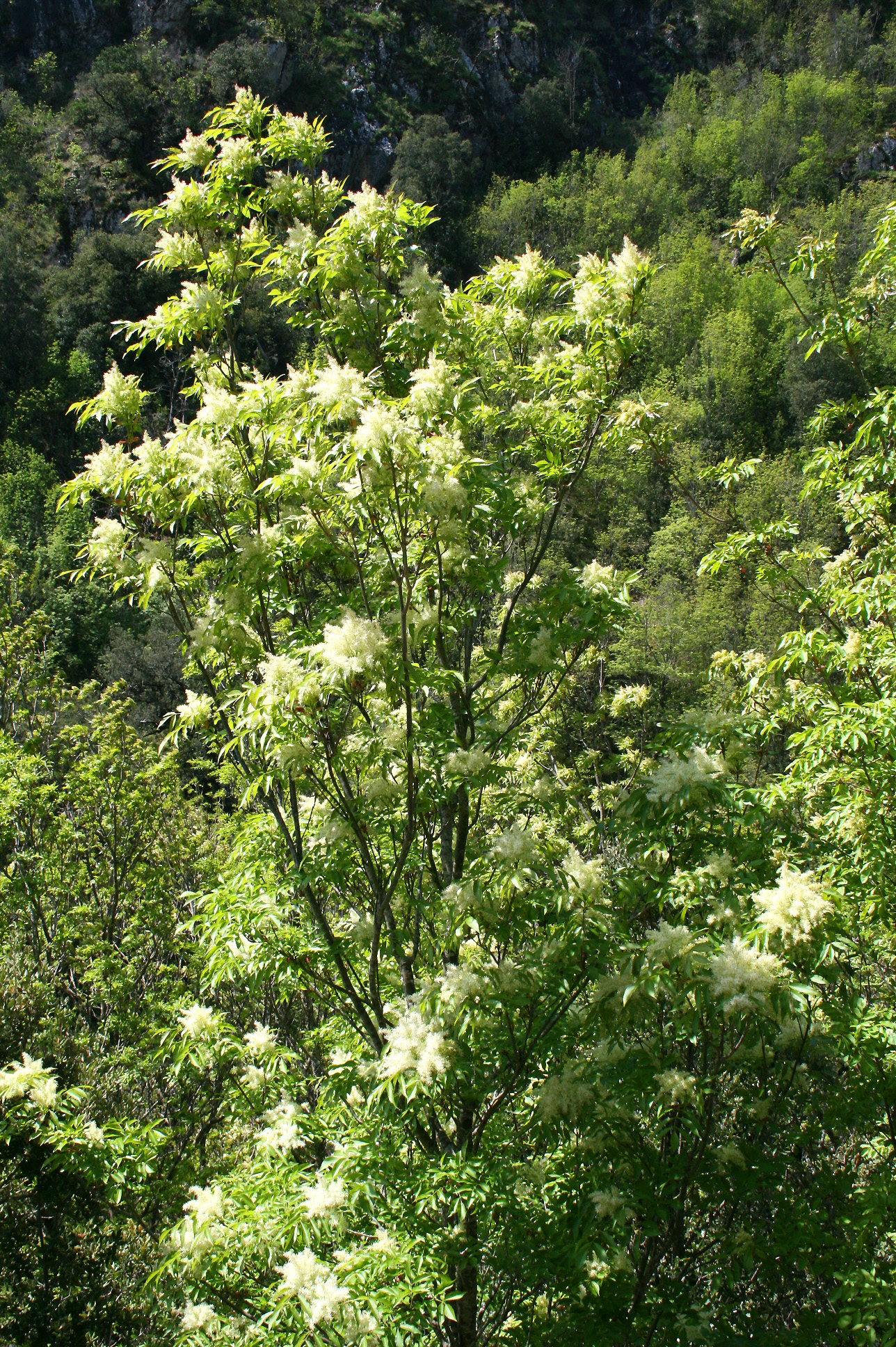
- Foliage and flowers

Conservation status
- Least Concern (IUCN 3.1)

Scientific classification
- Kingdom: Plantae
- Clade: Tracheophytes
- Clade: Angiosperms
- Clade: Eudicots
- Clade: Asterids
- Order: Lamiales
- Family: Oleaceae
- Genus: Fraxinus
- Section: Fraxinus sect. Ornus
- Species: F. ornus

Binomial name
- Fraxinus ornus L.
- Distribution map

= Fraxinus ornus =

Manna ash South European flowering ash

Species of ash tree

Fraxinus ornus, the manna ash or South European flowering ash, is a species of Fraxinus native to Southern Europe and Southwestern Asia, from Spain and Italy north to Austria and the Czech Republic, and east through the Balkans, Turkey, and western Syria to Lebanon and Armenia.

== Description ==
Fraxinus ornus is a medium-sized deciduous tree growing to 15–25 m (49–82 ft) tall with a trunk up to 1 m diameter. The bark is dark grey, remaining smooth even on old trees.

The buds are pale pinkish-brown to grey-brown, with a dense covering of short grey hairs.

The leaves are in opposite pairs, pinnate, 20–30 cm (7.9–12 in) long, with 5 to 9 leaflets; the leaflets are broad ovoid, 5–10 cm (2–4 in) long and 2–4 cm (0.8–2 in) broad, with a finely serrated and wavy margin, and short but distinct petiolules 5–15 mm (0.20–0.59 in) long; the autumn colour is variable, yellow to purplish.

The flowers are produced in dense panicles 10–20 cm (3.9–7.9 in) long after the new leaves appear in late spring, each flower with four slender creamy white petals 5–6 mm (0.20–0.24 in) long; they are pollinated by insects.

The fruit is a slender samara 1.5–2.5 cm (0.59–0.98 in) long, the seed 2 mm (0.08 in) broad and the wing 4–5 mm (0.2–0.2 in) broad, green ripening brown.

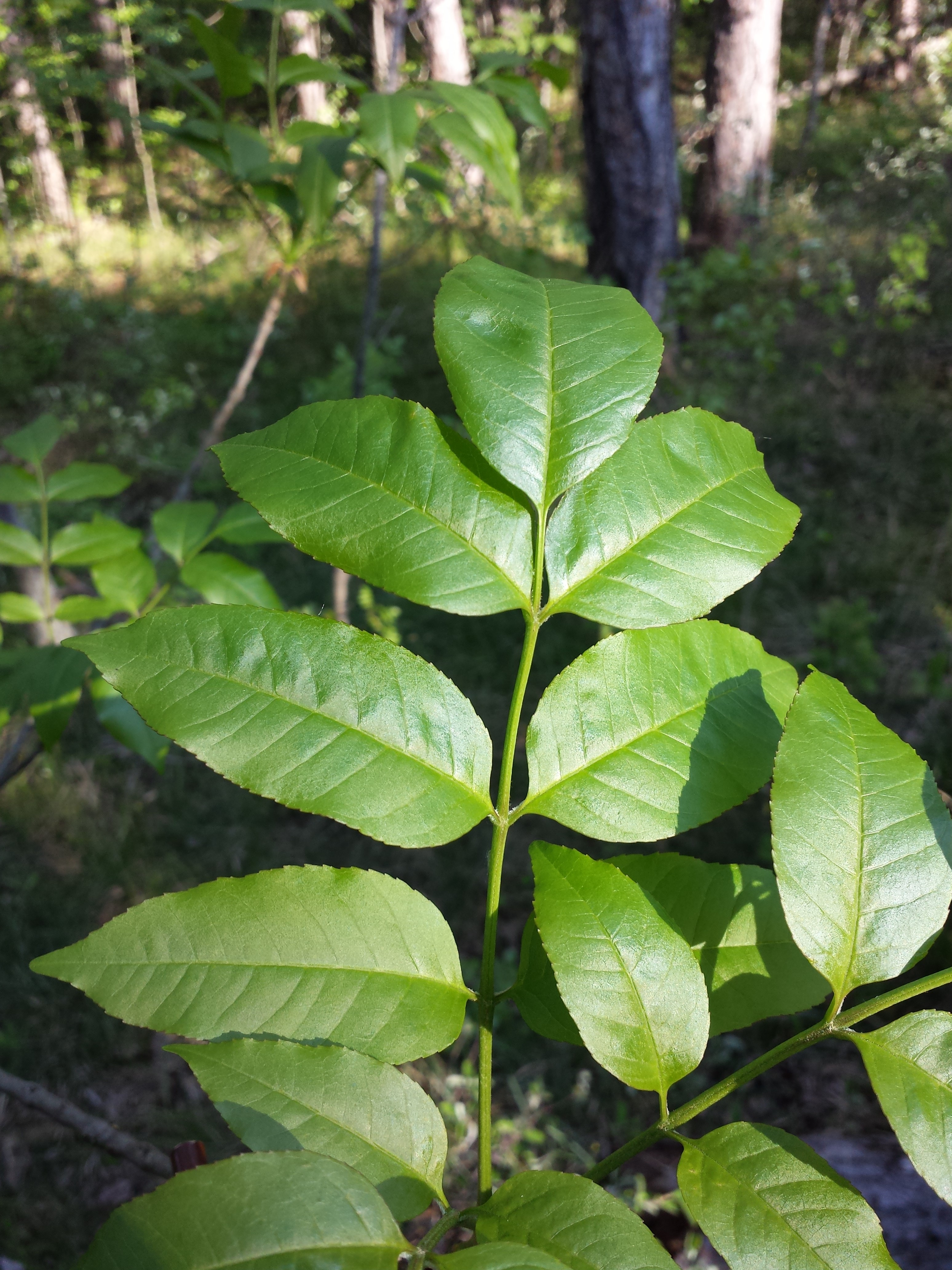
Leaf

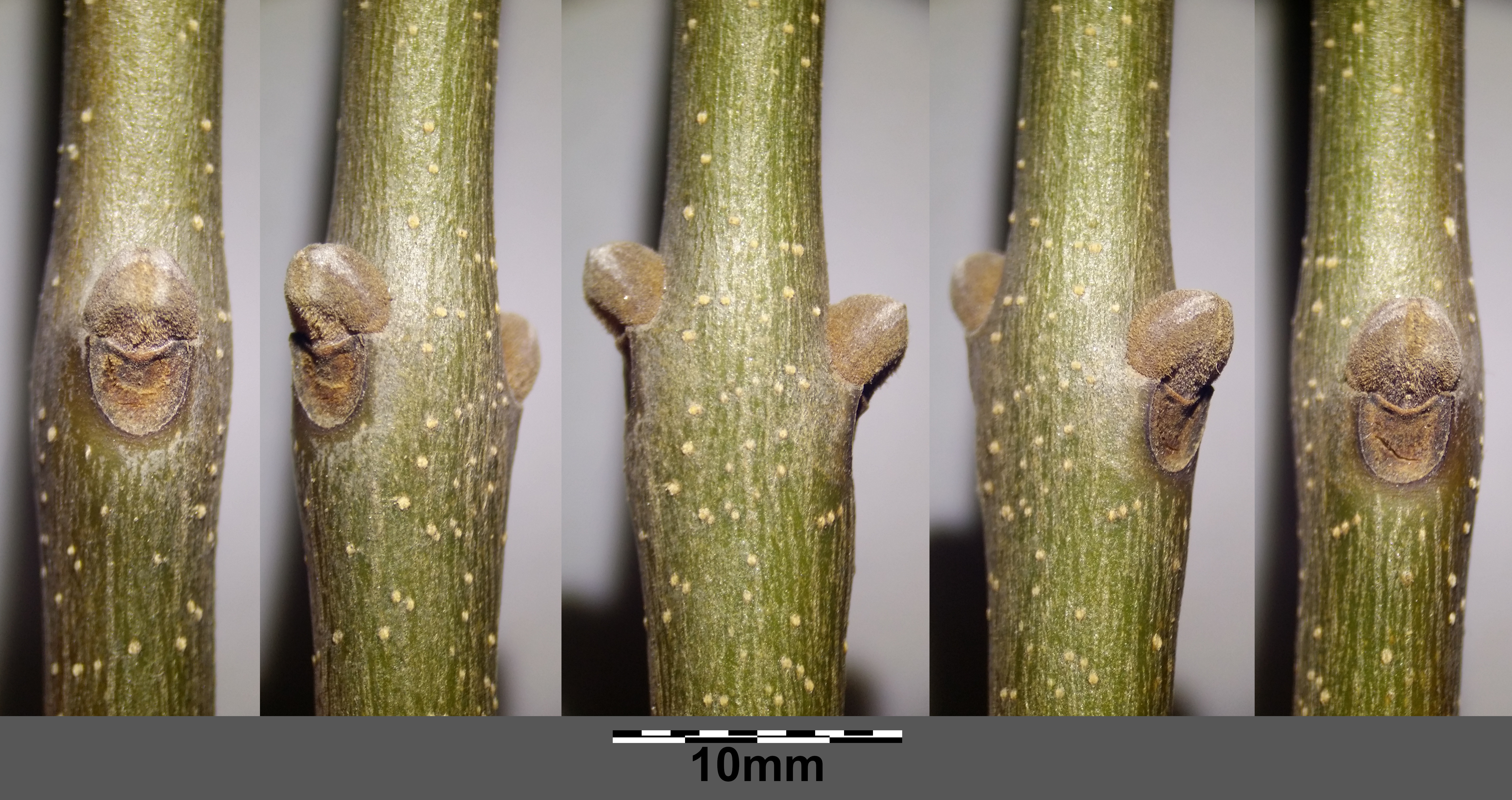
Twig with buds

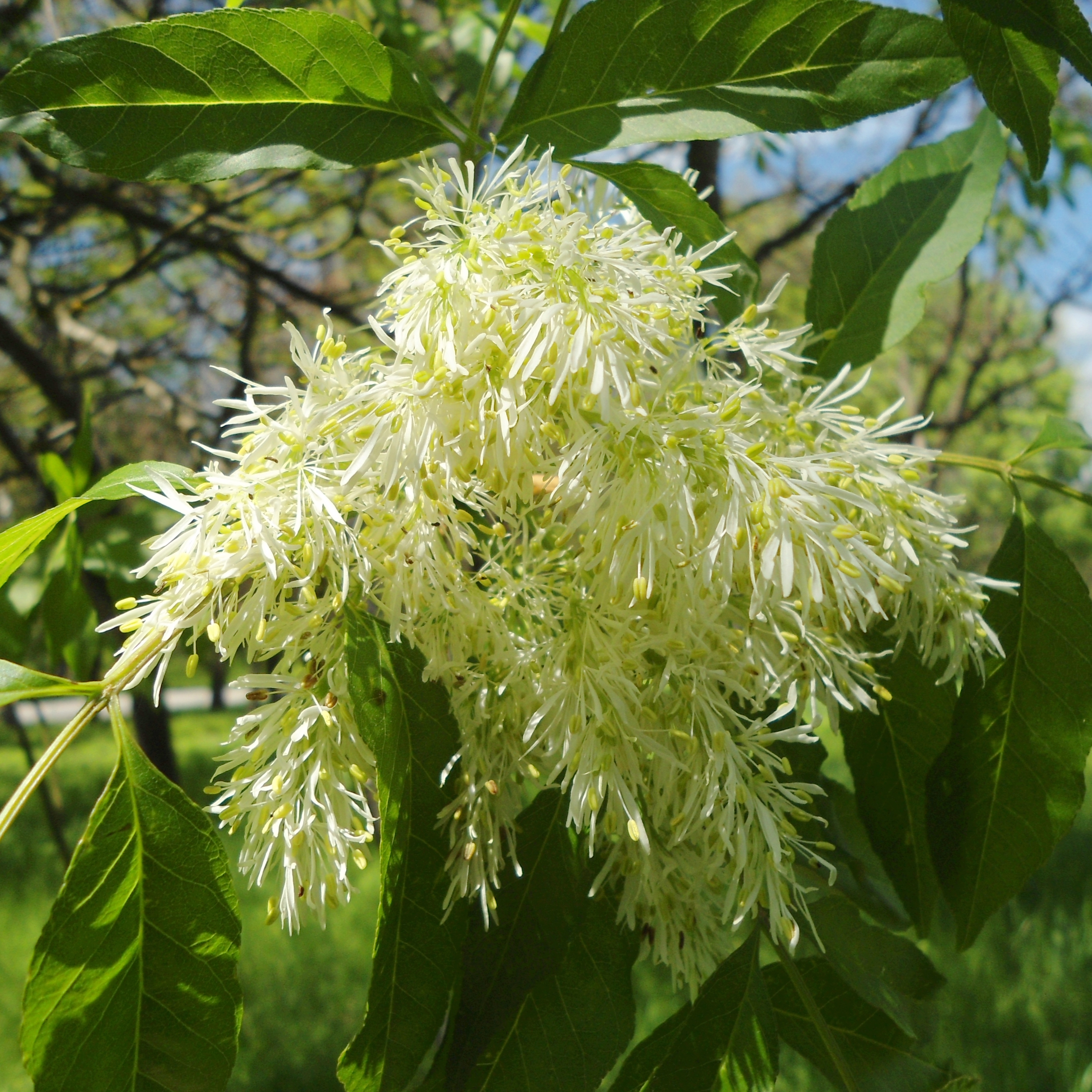
Inflorescence

Fruits

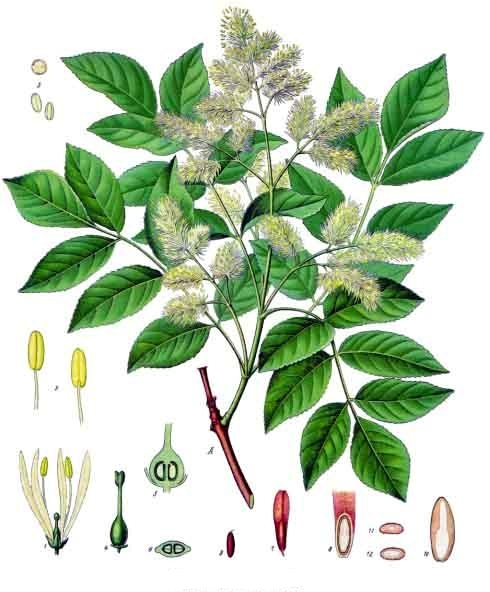
Botanical drawing by Franz Köhler, 1897

== Cultivation and uses ==
Fraxinus ornus is frequently grown as an ornamental tree in Europe north of its native range for its decorative flowers—the species is also sometimes called "flowering ash". Some cultivated specimens are grafted on rootstocks of Fraxinus excelsior, with an often very conspicuous change in the bark at the graft line to the fissured bark of the rootstock species.

A sugary extract from the sap may be obtained from the bark of the tree; which was compared to biblical manna in late medieval times (attested circa 1400 AD), giving rise to the name of the tree in English, Spanish (fresno del maná), and Italian (frassino da manna). Likewise, the sugar alcohol mannitol derives its name from the extract.
