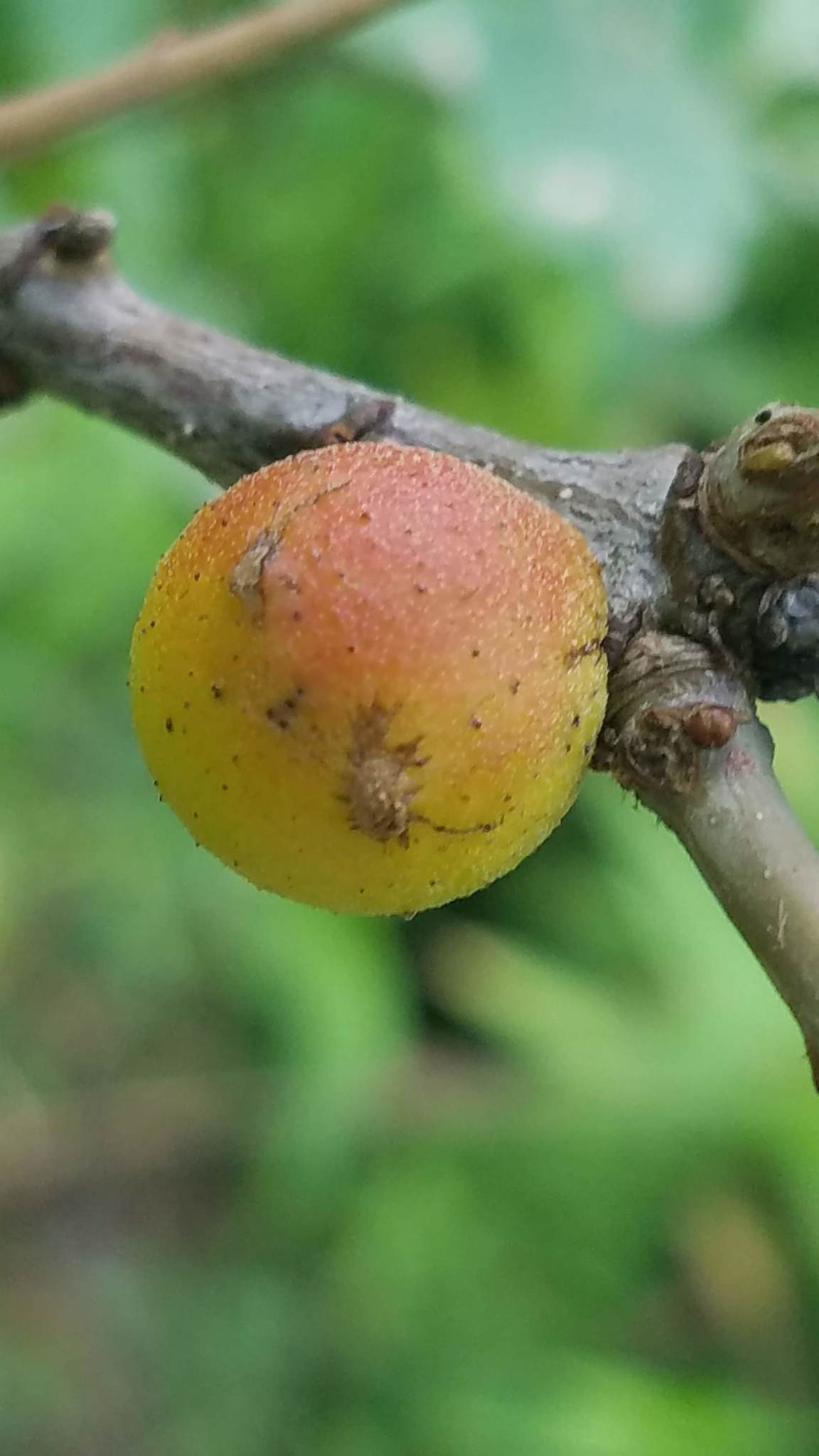
- Gall caused by Disholcaspis quercusglobulus

Scientific classification
- Kingdom: Animalia
- Phylum: Arthropoda
- Class: Insecta
- Order: Hymenoptera
- Family: Cynipidae
- Genus: Disholcaspis
- Species: D. quercusglobulus

Binomial name
- Disholcaspis quercusglobulus (Fitch, 1859)

= Disholcaspis quercusglobulus =

Species of wasp

Disholcaspis quercusglobulus, the round bullet gall wasp, is a species of gall wasp in the family Cynipidae.
