= Pierre Pomet =

French druggist of the 17th century

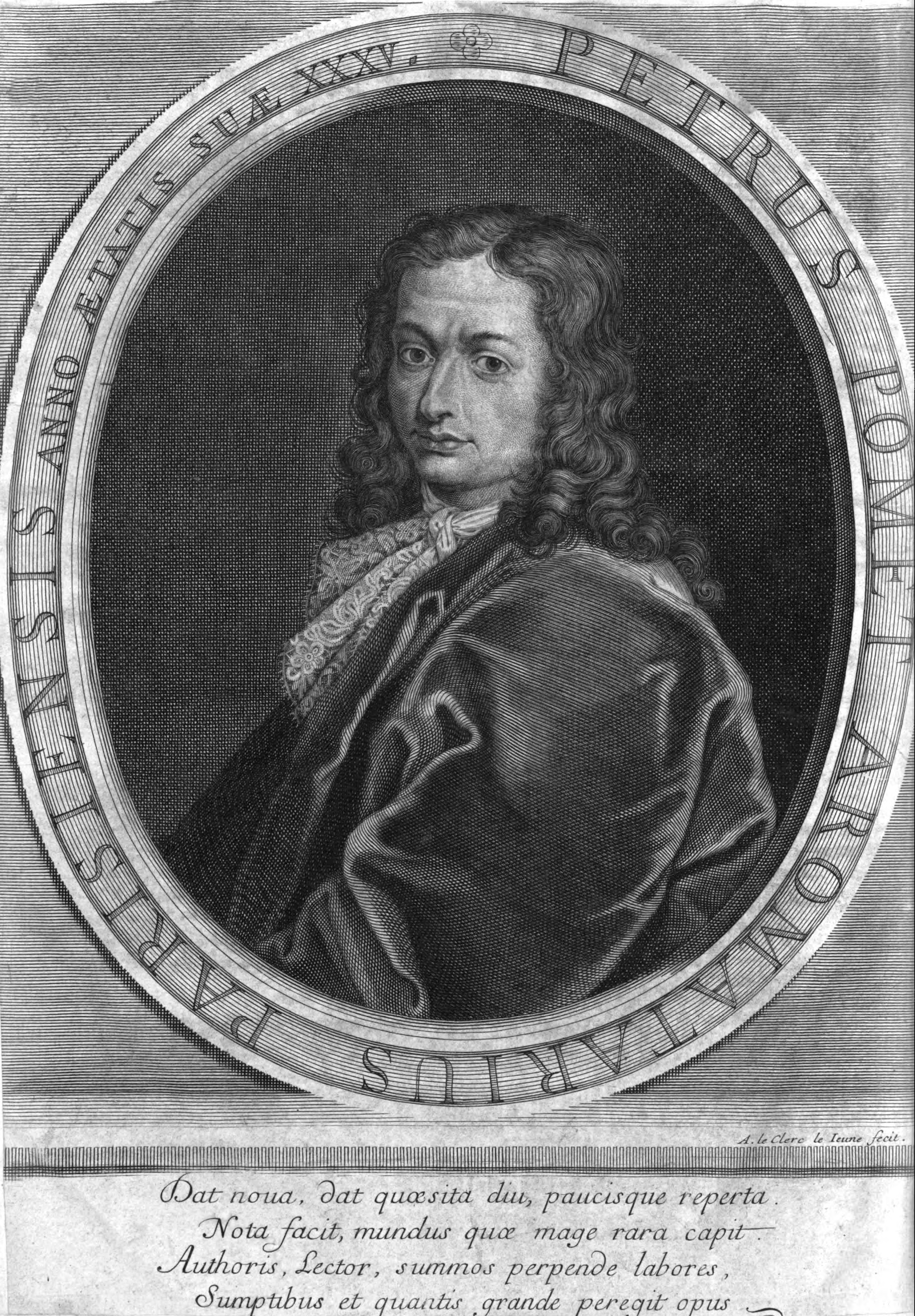
Pierre Pomet

Pierre Pomet (2 April 1658 – 18 November 1699) was a French pharmacist.

== Biography ==
He was born in Paris. After learning, he travelled in Italia, Germany, Great Britain and Netherlands where he collected specimens, recipes, and knowledge. He came back in Paris and opened a drug shop.

He quickly established himself as a successful pharmacist and taught to explain the manufacturing of his products. He became the chief druggist to Louis XIV and purveyor of medicinal remedies from distant lands, including sugar and coffee.

He regularly published an index of the simple and compound drugs of his rich collection and the description of his cabinet of curiosities.

In 1694, he published the Histoire générale des drogues (General History of Drugs) with about 400 engraved images. His text was translated into German and English in 1712 and widely circulated.

He died in Paris in 1699.

In 1776, botanists J.R. Forst. & G. Forst published Pometia, a genus of 2 species of rainforest trees from Asia, belonging to the plant family Sapindaceae. It was named in Pierre Pomet's honour.

== Works ==
- Pierre Pomet; Nicolas Lémery; Joseph Pitton de Tournefort (1748). A Complete History of Drugs. Written in French by Monsieur Pomet, Chief Druggist to the Late French King Lewis 14. to which is Added what is Farther Observable on the Same Subject ... Done Into English from the Originals. J. and J. Bonwicke, S. Birt, W. Parker, C. Hitch, and Wicksteed..
