= Honeydew (excretion) =

Sugar-rich liquid

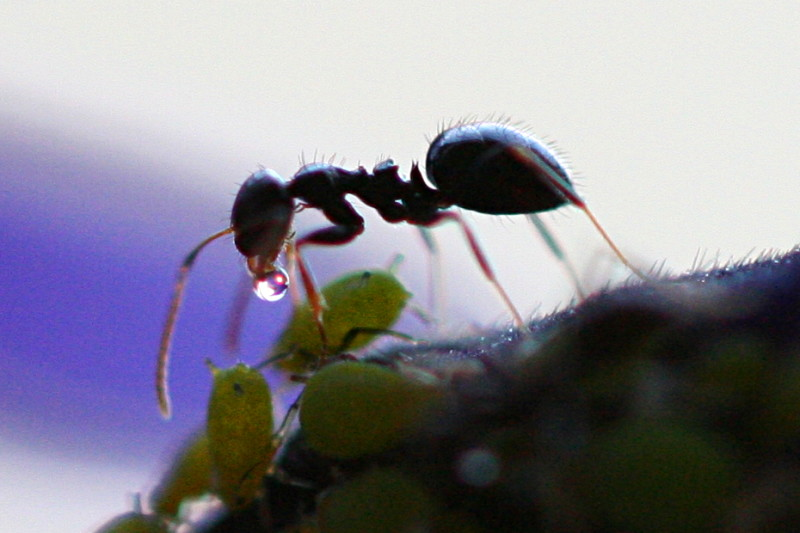
An aphid produces honeydew for an ant in an example of mutualistic symbiosis.

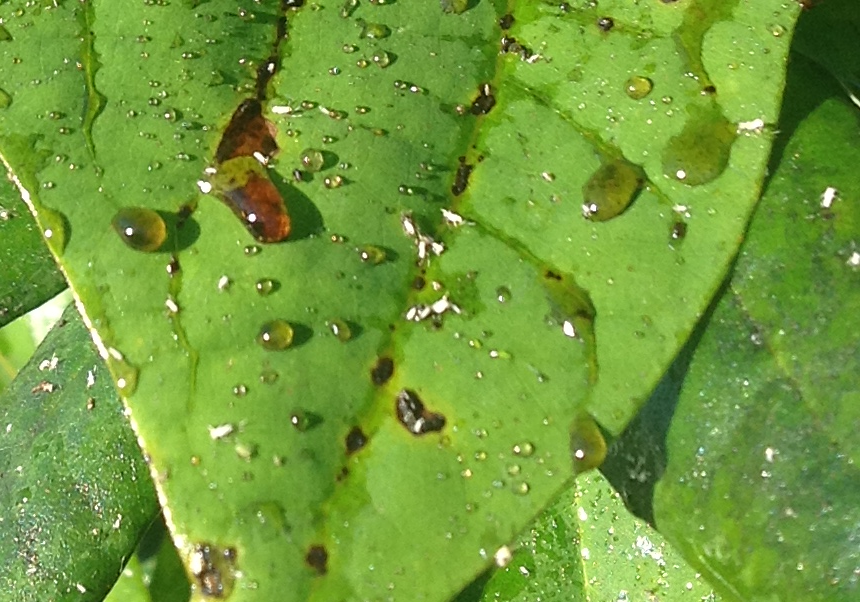
Honeydew drops on leaves

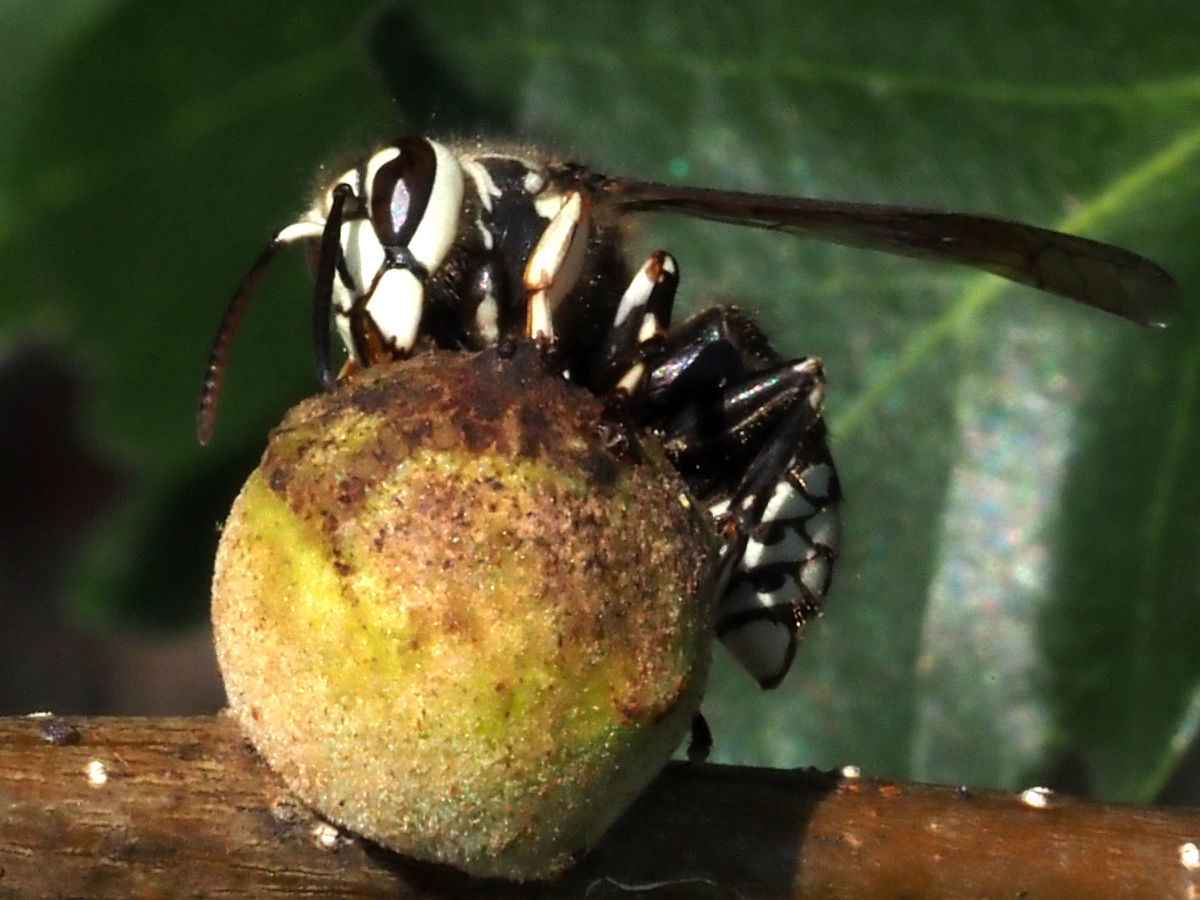
Bald-faced hornet sips honeydew from a Disholcaspis quercusmamma gall covered by sooty mold

Magicicada cassini "cicada rain" slow motion

Milkweed aphids on narrow-leaf milkweed eliminating honeydew. Unlike some aphids, these kick the drop away with their leg.

Honeydew is a sugar-rich sticky liquid that is excreted by aphids, some scale insects, many other true bugs, and some other insects as they feed on plant sap. When their mouthpart penetrates the phloem, the sugary, high-pressure liquid is forced out of the anus of the insects, allowing them to rapidly process the large volume of sap required to extract essential nutrients present at low concentrations. Honeydew is particularly common as an excretion in hemipteran insects and is often the basis for trophobiosis. Some caterpillars of Lycaenidae butterflies and some moths also produce honeydew. In addition to various sugars, honeydew contains small amounts of amino acids, other organic compounds, and inorganic salts, with its precise makeup affected by factors such as insect species, host plant species, and whether a symbiotic organism is present.

Honeydew-producing insects, such as cicadas, pierce phloem ducts to access sugar rich sap; the excess fluid released by cicadas as honeydew is called "cicada rain". The sap continues to bleed after the insects have moved on, leaving a white sugar crust called manna. Ants may collect, or "milk", honeydew directly from aphids and other honeydew producers, which benefit from the ants' presence due to their driving away predators such as lady beetles or parasitic wasps—see Crematogaster peringueyi. Animals and plants in a mutually symbiotic arrangement with ants are called Myrmecophiles.

In Madagascar, some gecko species in the genera Phelsuma and Lygodactylus are known to approach flatid plant-hoppers on tree-trunks from below and induce them to excrete honeydew by head nodding behaviour. The plant-hopper then raises its abdomen and excretes a drop of honeydew almost right onto the snout of the gecko.

Honeydew can cause sooty mold on many ornamental plants. It also contaminates vehicles parked beneath trees, and can then be difficult to remove from glass and bodywork. Honeydew is also secreted by certain fungi, particularly ergot. Honeydew is collected by certain species of birds, mosquitoes, wasps, stingless bees, and honey bees, which process it into a dark, strong honey (honeydew honey). This honey is highly prized in parts of Europe and Asia for its reputed medicinal value. Parachartergus fraternus, a eusocial wasp species, collects honeydew to feed to their growing larvae. Recent research has also documented the use of honeydew by over 40 species of wild, native, mostly solitary bees in California.

== Classification ==
Honeydew is an excretion, because it is unused food that is expelled through the insect's anus. The food is plant sap, very rich in sugar but low in protein, so excess sugar must be excreted. While honeydew is often called "secretion" because sugary liquid does not sound like a typical excreta, "secretions" come from specialized glands.

Like excreta in general, honeydew is harmful to the insect, e.g., promoting fungal growth, attracting enemies, and clogging surfaces. Many insects coat excreted honeydew droplets with wax secreted by setae and associated glands around the anal opening.

== Mythology ==
In Norse mythology, dew falls from the ash tree Yggdrasil to the earth, and according to the Prose Edda book Gylfaginning, "this is what people call honeydew and from it bees feed."

In Greek mythology, méli, or "honey", drips from the Manna–ash (Fraxinus ornus), with which the Meliae, or "ash tree nymphs", nursed the infant god Zeus on the island of Crete (as in the Hymn to Zeus by Callimachus).

Honey-dew is referenced in the last lines of Samuel Coleridge's poem Kubla Khan, perhaps because of its mythological connotations:

And all who heard should see them there,
And all should cry, Beware! Beware!
His flashing eyes, his floating hair!
Weave a circle round him thrice,
And close your eyes with holy dread,
For he on honey-dew hath fed,
And drunk the milk of Paradise.

== Nectar producing trees ==
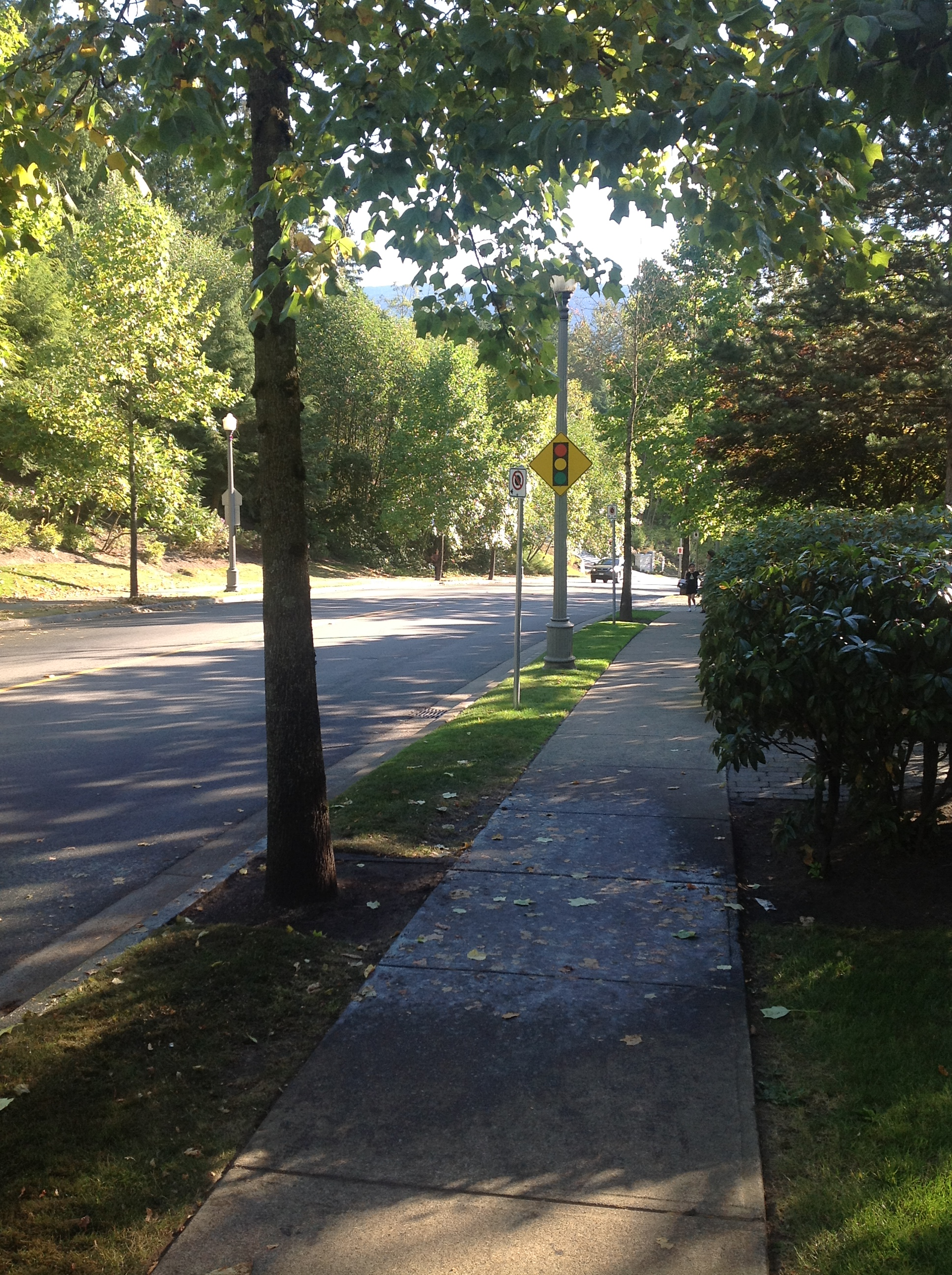
Honeydew puddle under a tree

=== Dates ===
Ommatissus lybicus is attracted to certain cultivars of the date palm tree. The honeydew producing insects preferred the Medjhool variety to the Deglet Noor in Israel, where they have been observed in the Arava Valley. Very dense insect populations may have some adverse effects. Different methods of controlling the insects, including natural and chemical, have been studied.

=== Eucalyptus ===
In eucalypt forests, production of both honeydew nectar and manna tends to increase in spring and autumn. Eucalyptus can produce even more manna than honeydew nectar. The sugar glider eats both, licking the nectar from branches. Other species attracted to the nectar include the feathertail glider, brush-tailed phascogale, and brown antechinus. Most trees are not able to produce sap if the phloem duct becomes damaged by mechanical processes.

=== Oaks ===
The acorn weevil (Curculio glandium) habitually bores into the young acorns of oak trees. This injury can cause the tree to release a sweet honeydew, thought to attract wasps that can parasitize the weevil within its acorns. Honey bees sometimes collect this substance, in addition to honeydew from aphids feeding in oak forests, and use it to produce oak honey, an unusual varietal sold by specialist beekeepers.

=== Tamarisk ===
Two scale insects in the Sinai, Trabutina mannipara and Najacoccus serpentinus, feed on Tamarisk trees. They excrete a sugary nectar that turns white when it hardens.

== Honeydew honey ==
The honey produced when bees harvest the honeydew of sap-eating insects such as aphids is known as honeydew honey or forest honey. It is notably darker and more viscous than typical honey. Honeydew honey typically contains more melezitose. It is prized in parts of Europe and New Zealand.

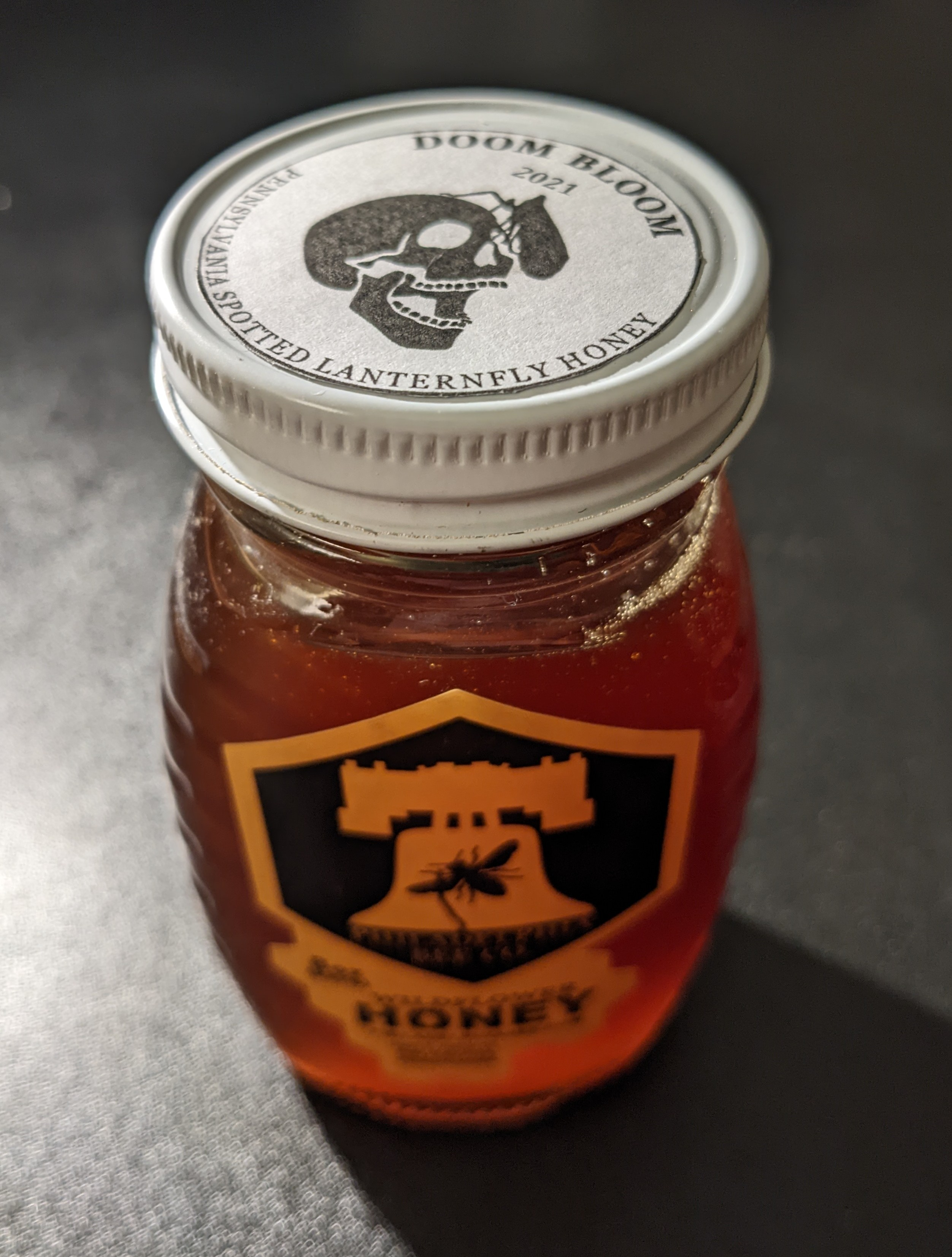
Canning jar containing honeydew honey

== See also ==
- Lerp (biology)
- List of honeydew sources
