= C. nivea =

C. nivea may refer to:

- Coccidiphila nivea, a moth species found in the United Arab Emirates
- Cordula nivea, a synonym for Paphiopedilum niveum
- Cubalaskeya nivea, a sea snail species
- Cyrestis nivea, the straight-line map-wing, a butterfly species found in south-east Asia

== See also ==
- Nivea (disambiguation)
