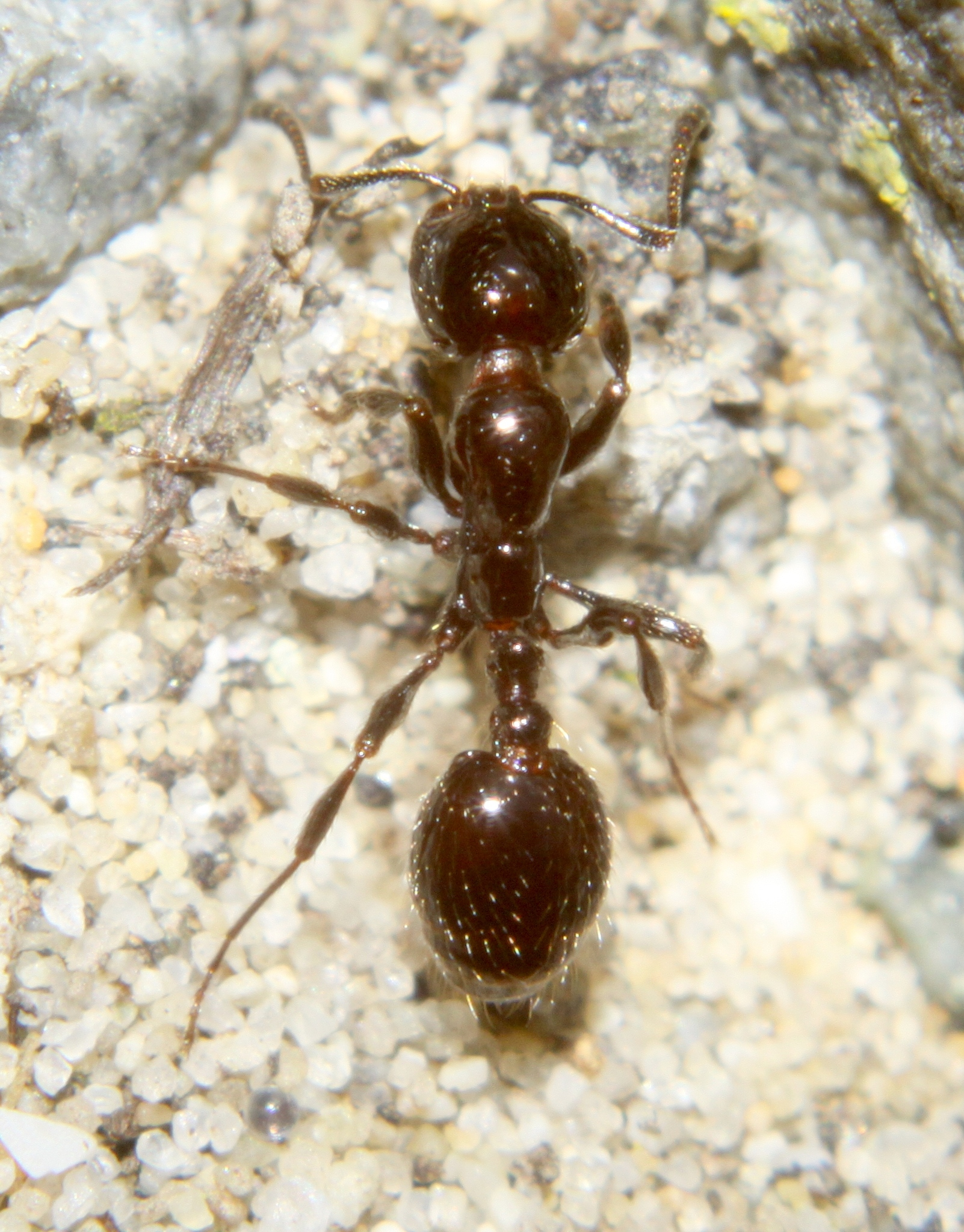
- Worker ant of Chelaner antarcticus

Scientific classification
- Kingdom: Animalia
- Phylum: Arthropoda
- Clade: Pancrustacea
- Class: Insecta
- Order: Hymenoptera
- Family: Formicidae
- Subfamily: Myrmicinae
- Genus: Chelaner
- Species: C. antarcticus

Binomial name
- Chelaner antarcticus (Smith, 1858)

Synonyms
- List: Atta antarctica Smith, 1858; Monomorium fulvum Mayr, 1862; Tetramorium nitidum Smith, 1876; Monomorium suteri Forel, 1892; Monomorium integrum Forel, 1894; Monomorium succineum Stitz, 1911; Aphenogaster antarctica (Smith, 1858); Formica antarctica (Smith, 1858); Monomorium antarcticum (Smith, 1858); Monomorium nitidum (Smith, 1876); Monomorium (Notomyrmex) antarcticum (Smith, 1858); Monomorium (Notomyrmex) integrum (Forel, 1894); Monomorium (Notomyrmex) nitidum (Smith, 1876); Monomorium (Notomyrmex) succineum (Stitz, 1911); Monomorium (Notomyrmex) suteri (Forel, 1894)

= Chelaner antarcticus =

Species of ant

Chelaner antarcticus, also known as the southern ant, is a species of ant endemic to New Zealand. It was first described in 1858 by British entomologist Frederick Smith and has undergone numerous taxonomic revisions. The ant is highly variable in size and colour, which has led scientists to suspect that it is in fact several species. It is widespread throughout New Zealand, even being found in the Kermadec Islands, and has also been observed in the Austral Islands. Colonies can be formed in a wide range of habitats such as native forest, grasslands and horticultural zones. The nest is constructed either under stones or under logs. It has a generalist diet that includes small arthropods, seeds and it also farms mealybugs for their secretions. C. antarcticus rarely co-occurs with several other species of ant, such as Prolasius advenus and the invasive argentine ant, with the reasons for this being a topic of research. The larva is known to be preyed upon by the larva of Helosciomyza subalpina, a species of fly.

== Taxonomy ==
This species was first described in 1858 by British entomologist Frederick Smith as Atta antarctica. In 1886, it was placed in the large and extremely diverse genus Monomorium. It has a complex taxonomic history and was described as several other species such as Tetramorium nitidum and Monomorium suteri, which were later recognised as synonyms of C. antarcticus. The holotype (representative specimen the species description is based on) is stored in the Natural History Museum of London under registration BMNH(E)1015318. It is commonly referred to as the "southern ant".

By the early 20th century Monomorium contained 10 subgenera, one of which was Monomorium (Chelaner). It was raised to generic level in 1966 to contain 37 Australian species along with 10 from New Caledonia, New Guinea, and New Zealand. In 1987 the morphological features of Chelaner were examined and found to be too variable to distinguish the genus, which was synonymised with Monomorium again. In 2019 after a comprehensive study of multiple genes the genus Chelaner was resurrected, to house a total of 53 Australasian and Pacific species, including this one, which would then be known as Chelaner antarcticus.

Because of the morphological variability of the species, it has been proposed that it actually represents multiple species. One study examined the venom chemistry of various populations and found that there was notably variability in the structure of the venom, indicating there may be undescribed species. In a morphometric study of specimens from Wellington, there was evidence of three morphospecies but more research and samples from throughout New Zealand is needed to confirm this.

== Description ==
The worker varies in size but is usually 3–5 millimetres (0.12–0.20 in) in length, with the head width varying from 0.60–0.88 millimetres (0.024–0.035 in). There are a total of 12 segments making up the antennae, with the last three segments forming a club. The mandibles generally have five teeth, but six are sometimes reported. The petiole and postpetiole (narrow waist-like segments connecting the thorax and abdomen) have rounded nodes. There is a groove on the metanotum (segment of the thorax), although it may be weakly defined. Spines on the propodeum (a segment of the thorax) are either blunt or absent. There is also a stinger present at the tip of the abdomen. The body colour is highly variable across colonies (but usually consistent within colonies), ranging from orange, light to dark brown, and black.

== Distribution and habitat ==
Chelaner antarcticus is endemic (only naturally occurring in) to New Zealand, where it is widespread in the North and South Island as well as Stewart Island. It is also present on smaller offshore islands such as the Three Kings Islands, the Chatham Islands, the Kermadec Islands and even the far away Austral Islands in Polynesia. It is found throughout many habitats including native forest, grasslands, wetlands, pastureland, household gardens as well as horticultural and industrial habitats. There is evidence that its range in urban habitats may be restricted due to competition with invasive ant species (such as the Argentine ant Linepithema humile), at least in northern parts of New Zealand.

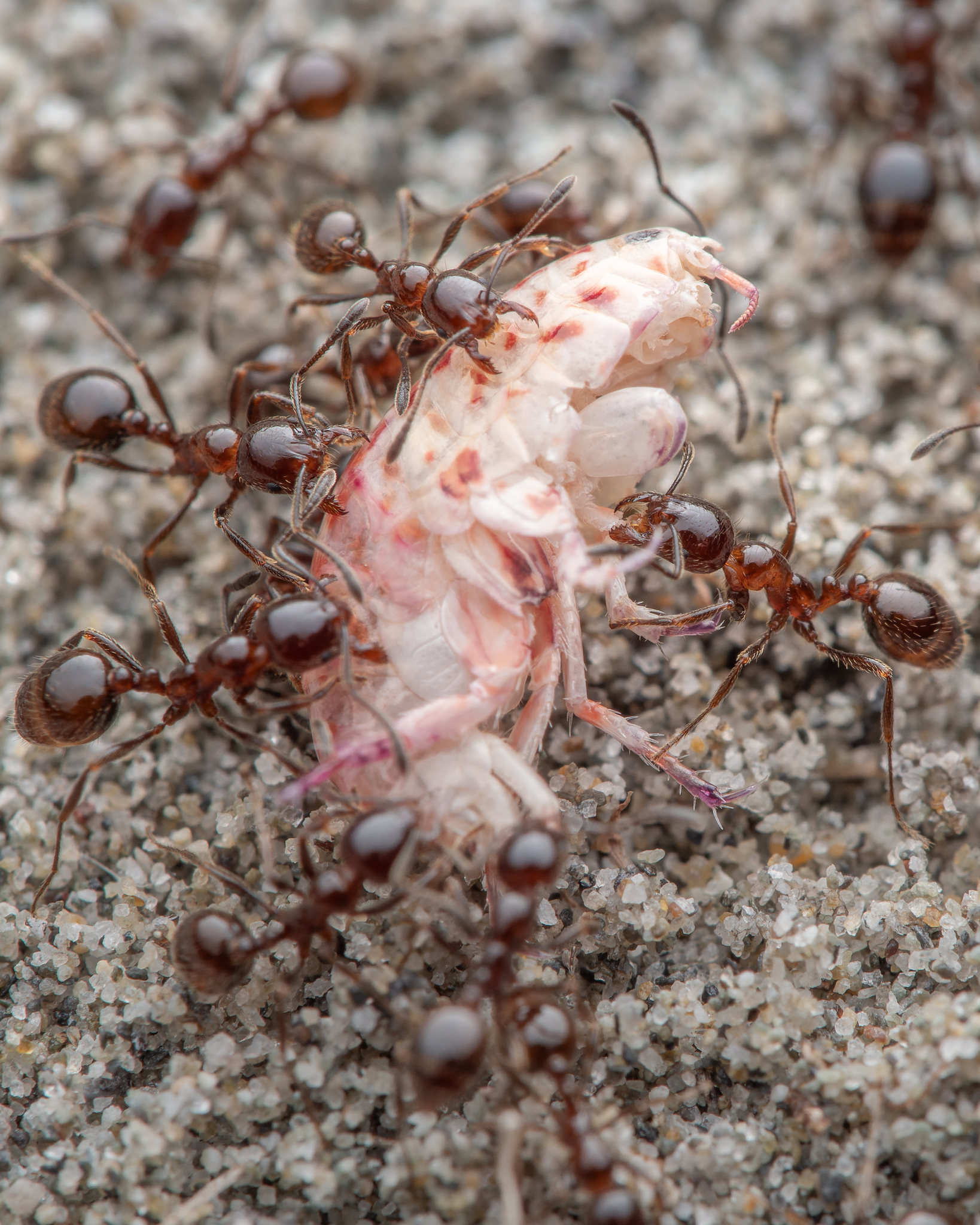
Workers scavenging a dead amphipod

== Ecology ==
The nest is constructed in rotting logs or in the ground. If they are built in the ground, they are often under stones or logs from trees, such as, tawa (Beilschmiedia tawa) and mataī (Prumnopitys taxifolia). If the soil becomes too dry, then the colony will relocate to a spot where it is wetter. In one study, if rain was simulated then the workers would move the brood from cavities to tunnels where it was safe. Once rainfall ceased, the brood would be returned to their cavities. The winged male and female can sometimes be found in flying swarms, being so numerous that they make an audible humming sound. This swarming behaviour typically occurs when conditions are warm and sunny.

The ant is a generalist feeder that scavenges for food, hunts small insects and farms homopterans. It has been recorded gathering large amounts of plant seeds and storing them in and around the colony. C. antarcticus has been recorded farming mealybug species such as Balanococcus poae, Dysmicoccus formicicola, Pseudococcus longispinus and Pseudococcus calceolariae. The ant has been observed stroking mealybugs with their antennae and removing their secretions for later use. The mealybugs will even be moved deeper into the colony when disturbed for their safety.

== Interactions with other species ==
The larvae of the fly Helosciomyza subalpina have been recorded feeding on the larvae of C. antarcticus in laboratory conditions, apparently showing a preference for it over other food sources. The fly larvae use their mouth-hooks to erode a hole into the ant larvae and then feed on liquid from the holes. In nature, the fly larvae have been found living in the nests of C. antarcticus in large numbers. Diplotoxa moorei, another species of fly, is also associated with the nest of C. antarcticus.

=== Interactions with ants ===
In one study, C. antarcticus was more common in the southern parts of the country. It was proposed that this is due to the presence of invasive ants in the north restricting their abundance, although further research is needed to confirm this. There are several species that C. antarcticus rarely co-occurs with. It was found that when the invasive Doleromyrma darwiniana was present in surveys, C. antarcticus would never be caught. In another study, it was found that C. antarcticus fed at a similar trophic level and had high niche overlap with the invasive Ochetellus glaber, which it also does not co-occur with. This suggests that they are undergoing competitive exclusion. The ant's distribution also overlaps very little with Prolasius advenus, another common endemic ant species. A couple of studies suggest that environmental factors such as diet, arrival sequence when colonising new areas, colony size and temperature collectively act as a filter which causes the two species to rarely co-occur.

C. antarcticus also appears to not co-occur with the (L. humile), which is invasive in New Zealand. In a survey of crop areas in the North Island, C. antarcticus was absent from sites in Napier and Hastings. This absence was proposed to be due to L. humile, as well as other invasive ant species. In one study, it was noted that the venom of C. antarcticus was ineffective against L. humile when compared to similar species, but the ant compensated for this by behaving far more aggressively. Because of this, it was proposed that these two species rarely co-occur because C. antarcticus actually excludes L. humile. In laboratory settings simulating L. humile colonising new areas, if the population of L. humile was small, then C. antarcticus would decimate it. In real settings however, small colonising populations of L. humile were able to persist, although C. antarcticus still sometimes destroyed their populations. In laboratory settings, colonies of L. humile were able to discover and exploit resources more quickly than C. antarcticus and could do so in a range of conditions. One other factor complicating their interactions is that neonicotinoids (which are used in some pesticides) caused both species to behave differently in their interactions and changed their dynamics. For example, if L. humile was exposed to neonicotinoids but C. antarcticus was not, then L. humile behaved more aggressively but tended to be decimated more readily. Alternatively, if only C. antarcticus was exposed to neonicotinoids but L. humile was not, then L. humile would be less aggressive and have a higher survival rate.
