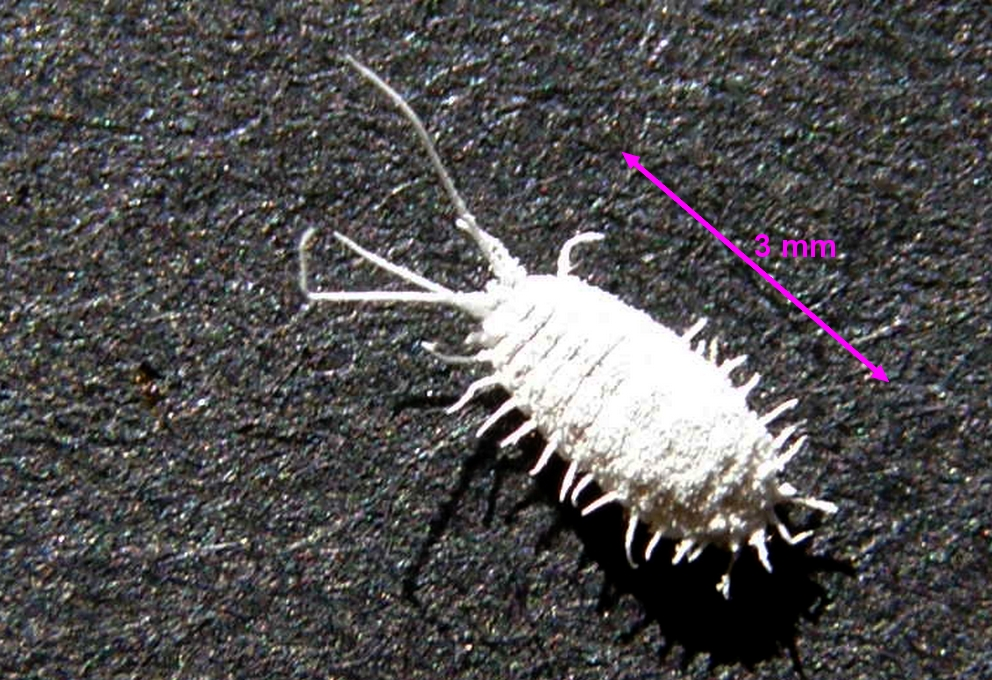

Scientific classification
- Kingdom: Animalia
- Phylum: Arthropoda
- Class: Insecta
- Order: Hemiptera
- Suborder: Sternorrhyncha
- Family: Pseudococcidae
- Genus: Pseudococcus
- Species: P. viburni

Binomial name
- Pseudococcus viburni Signoret, 1875

= Pseudococcus viburni =

Species of true bug

Pseudococcus viburni (formerly Pseudococcus affinis (Maskell), and commonly known as the obscure mealybug and tuber mealybug) is a close relative of the grape mealybug (P. maritimus) and a pest of the vineyards around the world.

== Distribution ==
P. viburni is a pest of vineyards in New Zealand, the Central Coast of California, and the tea gardens of northern Iran. Unlike the grape mealybug, the obscure mealybug is not native to California, having most likely been introduced to the region from either Australia or South America in the latter part of the 19th century. It is known to infest apple and pear in South Africa.

== Taxonomy ==
The obscure mealybug is thought to have evolved in Australia or South America. Its history in North America is not clear; from 1900 (when P. maritimus, the grape mealybug, was first described) to 1960, the obscure mealybug was variably misidentified as or synonymized with P. maritimus, P. longispinus, P. obscurus Essig, P. capensis Brian, P. malacearum Ferris, and P. affinis (Maskell). This taxonomic confusion has hampered attempts to trace the exact origin of the species, but its presence in both Australia and South America strongly suggests that it is of Gondwanan origin.

== Morphology ==
Obscure mealybugs exhibit a high degree of sexual dimorphism; females are flightless, larger, and longer-lived than the winged males, who cannot feed and die immediately after mating.

=== Females ===
The bodies of nymphal and adult female obscure mealybugs are rectangular, with rounded anterior and posterior ends. Adult females range from 1-5mm in length. Like all mealybugs, the obscure mealybug covers its body in a white, waxy secretion which accumulates in clumps along thin filaments protruding from its exoskeleton. This clumpy secretion lends the mealybug its characteristic mealy appearance.

=== Males ===
Male obscure mealybugs are tiny, fragile insects with long antennae and a single pair of wings. They bear a strong resemblance to common house flies, but have two white wax tail filaments.

=== Identification ===
It is important for vintners to distinguish between the obscure mealybug and its close relatives, the grape and vine mealybug. The obscure mealybug has longer, thinner, and more crooked filaments than does the vine mealybug, making the obscure mealybug look comparatively untidy. The most distinctive feature of the obscure mealybug is the set of two to four exceptionally long caudal filaments growing from the posterior of large nymphs and adult females. The insect's waxy secretion accumulates heavily on these filaments, making it appear to have several long "tails".

The obscure mealybug more closely resembles the grape mealybug than it does the vine mealybug, but the two can be distinguished by the color of the defensive fluid they secrete when disturbed; grape mealybugs secrete reddish-orange fluid, while obscure mealybugs secrete clear fluid. When crushed, the obscure mealybug's body contents (guts) are pinkish-grey.

== Life cycle ==
=== Females ===
Being in the order Hemiptera (so-called "true bugs"), obscure mealybugs undergo incomplete metamorphosis; nymphal young closely resemble adults in body shape, take six to nine weeks to mature, and retain the use of all six legs throughout their entire lives. Depending on temperature, obscure mealybugs may complete 2-3 generations per year; females will lay clutches of several hundred orange eggs in cottony sacs, from which nymphs will hatch and emerge after about 5–10 days. If environmental conditions are too cold, young nymphs will remain in the sac until temperatures rise.

Obscure mealybugs lay eggs all year long, and during winter, under the bark of trees and vines (though there is no true dormancy). These overwintering populations include individual mealybugs from all stages of development, but are dominated by eggs and first instars; overwinter mortality for young nymphs is high, but a few individuals (normally the ones quickest to hatch) will survive and feed on the first spring leaves. Mortality in non-overwintering generations is greatly decreased.

=== Males and mating ===
Male obscure mealybugs do not feed, and have very short lifespans (2–3 days); males will spin cocoons shortly after hatching, where they develop wings. Upon emerging from their cocoons, male obscure mealybugs will fly toward the scent of the female's sex pheromone, mate as many times as possible, then die. Given the male's short lifespan, the timing of the female's emission of sex pheromone is crucial; females will emit the pheromone day and night around the time of male emergence (especially in the spring), then cease immediately after fertilization. Obscure mealybugs generally mate at dusk and at dawn.

The female obscure mealybug sex pheromone has the unfortunate property of sometimes attracting parasitic wasps (such as Tetracnemoidea peregrina), and is therefore a kairomone.

== Ecology ==
=== Diet ===
Obscure mealybugs feed on the phloem of vines and woody-stemmed plants, especially pear and apple trees and grape vines. Some individuals are vectors for infectious pathogens and can transmit them from plant to plant while feeding; mealybug-spread grapevine leafroll associated virus type III (GRLaV-3), in particular, has wreaked havoc among the grapes of New Zealand, reducing the crop yield of infected vineyards by up to 60%.

=== Symbiosis ===
Female mealybugs excrete honeydew, a thick, sugary fluid created as a byproduct of digestion (large colonies of mealybugs can produce enough honeydew to seep through bark and leaves, leaving shiny, sticky patches on the exterior of the plant). Some ants have developed a mutualistic symbiotic relationship with obscure mealybugs, tending and protecting the insects from natural enemies to increase the production of honeydew, on which the ants feed. This relationship is similar to the one that some ants have with aphids.

=== Pestilence ===
This species is a pest in North America, South America, Australia, New Zealand, and Iran, especially in vineyards and fruit orchards. The obscure mealybug has caused particularly substantial damage to vineyards in the Central Coast of California, where it is an introduced species and has no natural predators.

==== Control ====
Many attempts have been made to control obscure mealybug populations in commercial greenhouses and vineyards, using both synthetic pesticides and introduced mealybug parasites. Since the obscure mealybug's waxy coating and habit of seeking sheltered feeding sites protect it from water-based pesticides, oil-based organophosphate pesticides (among the more toxic of pesticides) are most effective in reducing population density, though such pesticides can harm plants if applied after the first budding. Even so, some New Zealand obscure mealybug populations have developed a resistance to organophosphate pesticides.

Because of the high toxicity and strict regulation of organophosphate pesticides, some Californian vintners have imported natural parasites of the obscure mealybug from Chile, particularly Pseudaphycus flavidulus and Leptomastix epona. Such efforts have so far produced indeterminate results; the obscure mealybug is capable of encapsulating and killing the eggs of L. epona and L. dactylopii, for example, rendering those parasites ineffective. On the other hand, significant success in reducing obscure mealybug populations has resulted from isolating them from their symbiont ants.

Late-season insecticide has proven ineffective in apple and pear in South Africa. In 1983 and Kaiser et al. 2001 find P. viburni to have taken residence in these pomes by that time in the season, at the calyx or distal end, and unreachable to sprays.
