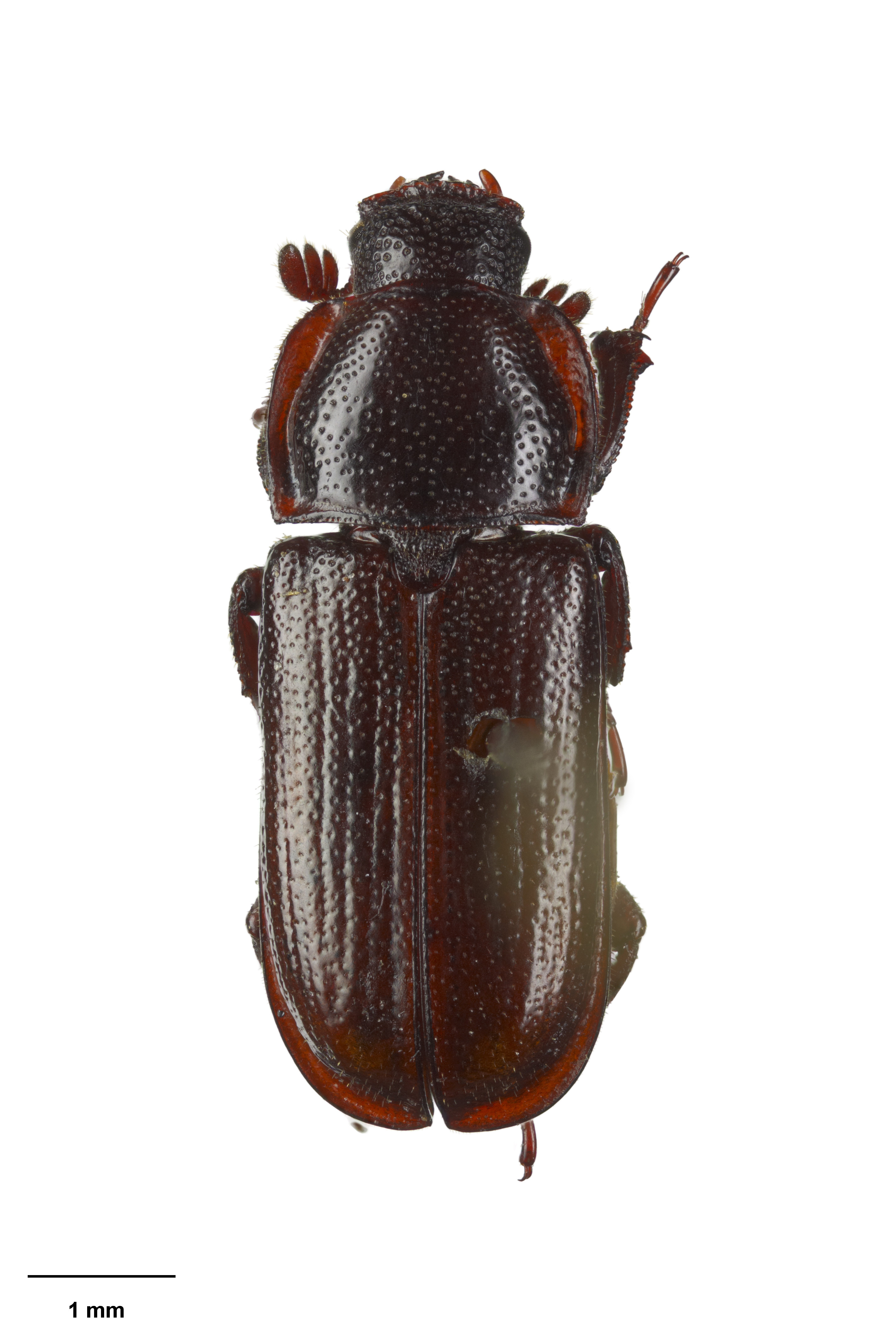
- Adult

Scientific classification
- Kingdom: Animalia
- Phylum: Arthropoda
- Clade: Pancrustacea
- Class: Insecta
- Order: Coleoptera
- Suborder: Polyphaga
- Infraorder: Scarabaeiformia
- Family: Lucanidae
- Genus: Holloceratognathus
- Species: H. passaliformis

Binomial name
- Holloceratognathus passaliformis (Holloway, 1962)

Synonyms
- List: Ceratognathus passaliformis Holloway, 1962

= Holloceratognathus passaliformis =

Species of beetle

Holloceratognathus passaliformis is a species of beetle in the genus Holloceratognathus. It is known only from a small forested area in and around the Wellington region, including the Orongorongo Valley and Wainuiomata. H. passaliformis typically inhabits forest habitats, where it lives almost exclusively inside the nests of the ant Prolasius advenus. The species was first formally described in 1962 by B.A. Holloway, from a specimen collected at Jacob's Ladder in the Orongorongo Valley. Adults are small, brown, and cryptic, with paddle-shaped fore-tibiae and reduced wings, giving them a compact and ant-nest-adapted appearance.
