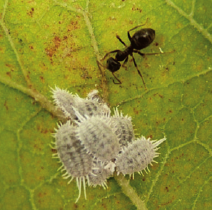
- Pseudococcus comstocki (bottom left)

Scientific classification
- Domain: Eukaryota
- Kingdom: Animalia
- Phylum: Arthropoda
- Class: Insecta
- Order: Hemiptera
- Suborder: Sternorrhyncha
- Family: Pseudococcidae
- Genus: Pseudococcus
- Species: P. comstocki

Binomial name
- Pseudococcus comstocki (Kuwana, 1902)

= Pseudococcus comstocki =

Species of true bug

Pseudococcus comstocki, common name Comstock mealybug, is a species of mealybug. The species was first discovered in 1902 in Japan. It is an invasive pest species that feeds on fruit and plants.

== Description ==
Adult female Comstock mealybugs are 3 to 5 mm (0.12 to 0.20 in) long, have no wings, and have "17 pairs of filaments" that extend from the edge of its body with a longer pair at the rear. The adult males are minuscule, similar to the size of gnats, and have a short life span. The larvae resemble female adults except for "being smaller with less wax and no long filaments". Its eggs are 0.3 mm (0.012 in) long orange ovals that are clumped together on twigs, cuts on trees, and on fruit during the summer. During autumn, the egg clusters are laid in bark crevices. Each mass of eggs is referred to as an ovisac or a nest and it is coated with white filaments that resemble cotton.

== Feeding and control ==
The species use "piercing-sucking mouthparts" to create honeydew that causes mold, that is the color of soot, to grow on fruit. They are a pest, including in eastern North America where the species is the main mealybug pest. The Comstock mealybug feeds on apples, pears, peaches, and many ornamental plants. The honeydew stops photosynthesis while also damaging the plant. Chemicals have been used to reduce the population of the species with 80% efficiency although it has not been successful in Central Asia. A mixture of biological pest control and chemicals successfully removed the species from orchards and vegetable fields in what was once part of the USSR. Parasitoids and predators were brought into California to control the species population including Pseudaphycus malinus, Allotropa convexifrons, Allotropa burrelli, and Zarhopalus corvinus. In a 1980 Japanese study, virgin adult females were taken from pumpkins so that scientists could extract their sex pheromone in order to capture the males.

== Range ==
In 1902, the species was first discovered by Shinkai Inokichi Kuwana on mulberry and maple trees in Japan. The species is native to eastern Asia and it was introduced into central Asia, eastern Europe, the United States, Canada, Brazil, and Argentina. It was originally believed that P. comstocki was in New Zealand, but a 1977 study determined that the specimens were P. calceolariae and P. obscurus.
