= Coccidiphila patriciae =

Scientific classification
- Domain: Eukaryota
- Kingdom: Animalia
- Phylum: Arthropoda
- Class: Insecta
- Order: Lepidoptera
- Family: Cosmopterigidae
- Genus: Coccidiphila
- Species: C. patriciae

Binomial name
- Coccidiphila patriciae J. Nel & A. Nel, 2000

Species of moth

Coccidiphila patriciae is a moth in the family Cosmopterigidae. It is found on the Canary Islands.

The wingspan is 9–10 mm (0.35–0.39 in). Adults have been recorded in February.

The larvae feed on the seeds of Ixanthus viscosus.
