= Coccidiphila stegodyphobius =

Scientific classification
- Domain: Eukaryota
- Kingdom: Animalia
- Phylum: Arthropoda
- Class: Insecta
- Order: Lepidoptera
- Family: Cosmopterigidae
- Genus: Coccidiphila
- Species: C. stegodyphobius

Binomial name
- Coccidiphila stegodyphobius (Walsingham, 1903)

Synonyms
- Batrachedra stegodyphobius Walsingham, 1903; Batrachedra stegodyphobia

Species of moth

Coccidiphila stegodyphobius is a moth in the family Cosmopterigidae. It was described by Walsingham in 1903. It is found in South Africa.
