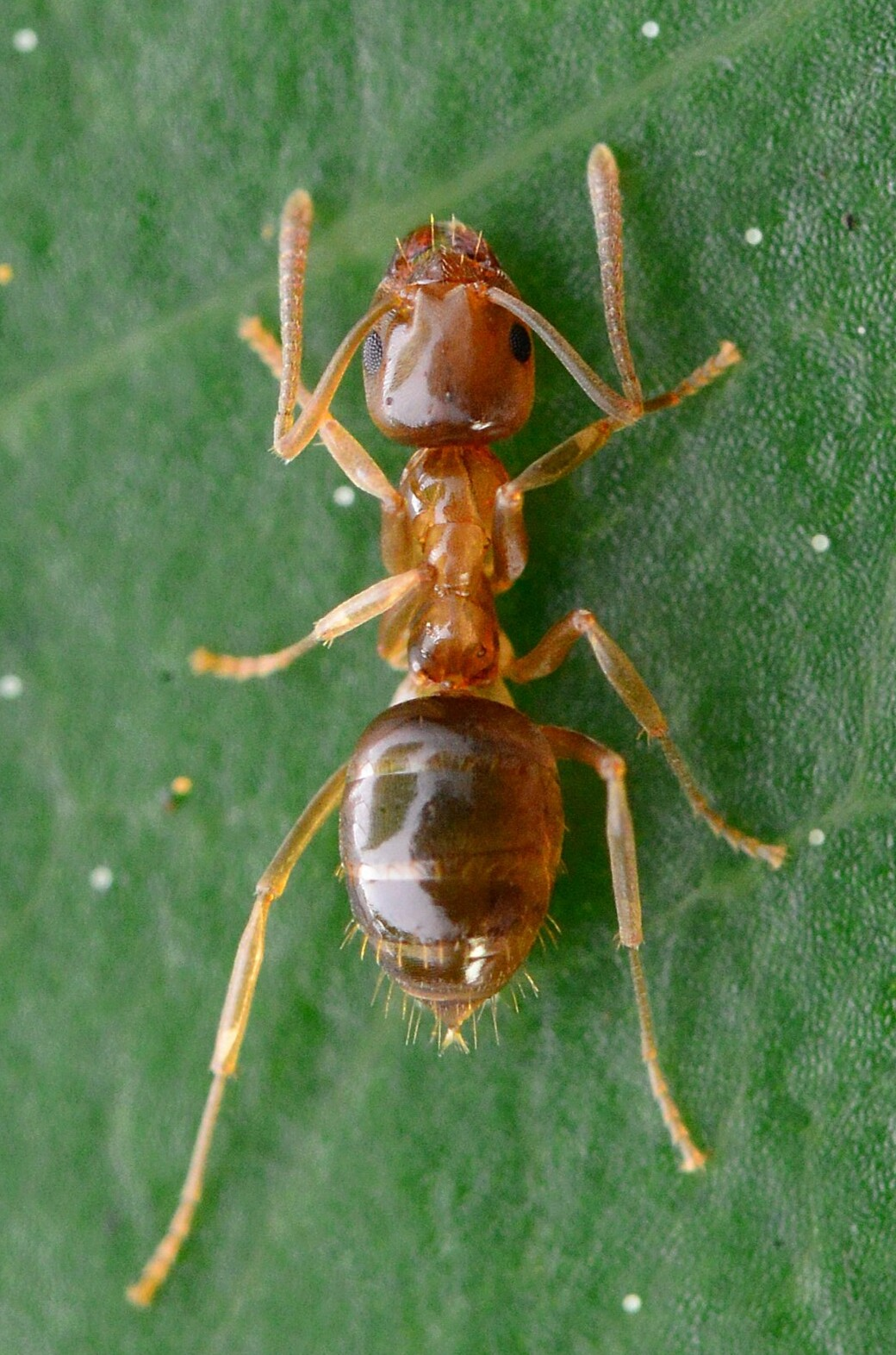
- Prolasius advenus worker

Scientific classification
- Kingdom: Animalia
- Phylum: Arthropoda
- Class: Insecta
- Order: Hymenoptera
- Family: Formicidae
- Subfamily: Formicinae
- Genus: Prolasius
- Species: P. advenus

Binomial name
- Prolasius advenus (Smith, 1862)

Synonyms
- List: Formica advena Smith, 1862; Formica zealandica Smith, 1878; Prenolepis advena Mayr, 1886; Lasius (Prolasius) advena Forel, 1892; Lasius advena Dalla Torre, 1893; Melophorus advena Forel, 1905; Lasius zealandica Dalla Torre, 1893; Melophorus (Prolasius) advena Emery, 1925; Colobopsis zealandica Wheeler, 1927; Prolasius zealandica McAreavey, 1947

= Prolasius advenus =

Species of ant

Prolasius advenus is a species of ant in the genus Prolasius. It is endemic to New Zealand, where it is widespread across the North and South Islands, including offshore islands. P. advenus typically occurs in forest habitat, but can also sometimes be found in open habitats such as tussocks. It was first formally described in 1862 by Frederick Smith from a specimen collected in Lyttelton. It is commonly referred to as the "small brown bush ant". The ant is small and coloured brown, with workers being 2.9–3.5 mm in length. Colonies typically have hundreds of workers and several queens. It is a generalist forager that scavenges for food. When starved of food, it becomes more aggressive towards other ant species. Unlike some other ant species, the worker is not sterile and can produce male offspring if the queen is absent. Several species of beetle, such as Holloceratognathus passaliformis and Neosampa granulata, live in the nests. P. advenus is impacted by high densities of Vespula wasps, which cause genetic bottlenecks and result in the worker having a smaller body size.

== Taxonomy ==
This species was first described as Formica advena by Frederick Smith in 1862 from a specimen collected in Lyttelton. In 1878 Smith unknowingly described this species again as Formica zealandica. Both Formica advena and Formica zealandica have been transferred to other genera numerous times. In 1892 Formica advena was placed in the genus (then subgenus) Prolasius, of which it is the type species. In 1958 Formica zealandica was later recognised as a synonym of P. advenus. The holotype specimen is stored in the Natural History Museum of London under registration number BMNH(E)1016251. The species is commonly referred to as the "small brown bush ant".

== Description ==
The female worker is 2.9–3.5 mm in length. It is brown in colour, with the abdomen being somewhat darker and the legs lighter. The antennae are 12-segmented, with a long scape. Each mandible has 6 teeth. The clypeus is roundish and has a ridge. On the metanotum, there is a well-defined groove. The petiole is shaped like a wedge. At the apex of the abdomen, there is a ring of hair. The non-worker (reproductive) female is similar to the worker but larger, measuring around 4.6–6 mm in length, and is more darkly coloured than the worker. Before mating for the first time, the female possess wings. The male is similar to the worker, but is more slender and somewhat smaller. It is yellow brown in colour and has a small head with large eyes. The pupae is wrapped in a cocoon that is creamy in colour.

== Distribution and habitat ==
Prolasius advenus is endemic to New Zealand, where it is widespread and very common throughout the North Island, the South Island and Stewart Island. It also occurs on offshore islands such as Three Kings Islands. It occurs in habitats such as beech, mixed podocarp and podocarp forests, but can also sometimes be found in open habitat such as tussock (but usually in the vicinity of forest edges). The altitudinal distribution goes from sea level up to at least 1200 m in altitude.

== Biology ==
Colonies can include hundreds of workers and multiple queens. One study reported a colony with roughly 500 workers, twelve queens, and approximately 90 males. The nest is quite complex, with numerous interconnected galleries. The queens and males are typically found deeper in the nest, but will occasionally come to the surface.

It is a generalist forager, preying upon and scavenging small arthropods, as well as tending mealybugs and scale insects for honeydew. When struggling to gather sufficient carbohydrates or proteins, the worker will focus on gathering the nutrient it is most lacking. Because of this, more workers will leave the colony to perform foraging behaviour. During this period of starvation, it behaves more aggressively towards other ants. This may indicate that P. advenus will be able to at least partly adapt to food competition due to the presence of exotic species. P. advenus will also become more aggressive and forage more when temperatures increase. In one study, as temperatures decreased from 23°C to 13°C, workers walking speeds became slower and it took them significantly longer to forage for food. This was similarly observed when the workers were increasingly starved. It has been suggested that the workers lay pheromone trails to guide other workers to food sources.

Although the worker is often sterile, the worker of P. advenus still possesses functional ovaries and can produce eggs. In one study, the worker produced eggs in colonies that had no queen, indicating that in nature they can produce males if the queen dies or is otherwise absent.

== Interactions with other species ==
The stag beetle Holloceratognathus passaliformis has only ever been found living in the nests of Prolasius advenus. The beetle is only known from a few localities near Wellington. The rove beetle species Neosampa granulata and Zeasampa nunni also live in the nests of P. advenus. Other beetles such as featherwing beetles and Ecomorypora granulata have also been recorded in nests. A species of nematode, Diploscapter formicidae, also parasitises P. advenus. The juveniles of this nematode occupy the heads of workers. Because of the wide distribution of P. advenus, it is likely that D. formicidae is widespread in New Zealand as well.

There is very little overlap in distribution between P. advenus and Chelaner antarcticus, one of the few other species of endemic ant. The authors suggested that environmental conditions may act as a strong filter contributing to the negative co-occurrence observed between the two species. Another factor is that when P. advenus first arrives in an area, it has increased aggressive behaviour in both species. In one experiment, when P. advenus was in greater numbers, C. antarcticus was less aggressive whereas if C. antarcticus was more abundant, then P. advenus would instead be more aggressive. It was also found that P. advenus was more active on a diet of low carbohydrates and high proteins whereas C. antarcticus was more active on the opposite diet. Overall this indicates that arrival sequence and diet may also contribute to the negative co-occurrence of these two species.

The wasps Vespula germanica and Vespula vulgaris are exotic species in New Zealand and have impacted P. advenus. Genetic bottlenecks in P. advenus populations have been recorded in areas where Vespula populations are high. It was hypothesized that this was because of Vespula preying upon the winged queens. Similarly, in areas of high wasp density, the worker of P. advenus had a smaller body size. This was hypothesized to be due to it competing with Vespula for food. In another study, Vespula wasps were filmed grabbing P. advenus, flying off with them and harmlessly dropping them from up high. This was done to workers that were competing with the wasps for a food source and occurred more frequently when there were more workers present.
