= Coccidiphila violenta =

Scientific classification
- Kingdom: Animalia
- Phylum: Arthropoda
- Class: Insecta
- Order: Lepidoptera
- Family: Cosmopterigidae
- Genus: Coccidiphila
- Species: C. violenta

Binomial name
- Coccidiphila violenta (Meyrick, 1916)

Synonyms
- Batrachedra violenta Meyrick, 1916; Cosmopterix violenta

Species of moth

Coccidiphila violenta is a moth in the family Cosmopterigidae. It was described by Edward Meyrick in 1916. It is found in Guyana.

The male of this species has a wingspan of 7 mm (0.28 in). The forewings are very narrowly lanceolate of deep ochreous coloration with some blackish irrorations (sprinkles) suffused with grey.
