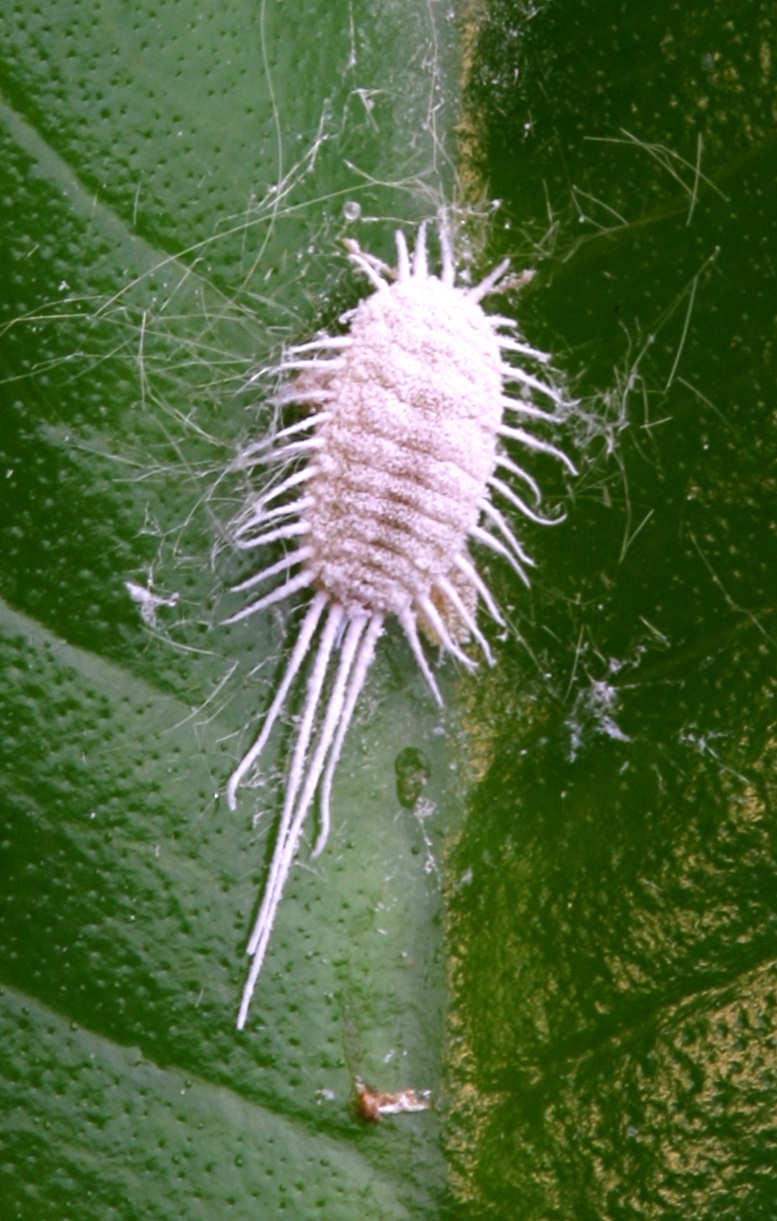
- Pseudococcus longispinus, the long-tailed mealybug

Scientific classification
- Kingdom: Animalia
- Phylum: Arthropoda
- Class: Insecta
- Order: Hemiptera
- Suborder: Sternorrhyncha
- Family: Pseudococcidae
- Genus: Pseudococcus; Westwood, 1840

Species
- 150+, see text

= Pseudococcus =

Genus of true bugs

Pseudococcus is a genus of unarmoured scale insects in the family Pseudococcidae, the mealy bugs. There are more than 150 species of Pseudococcus.

== Species ==
Species include:

- Pseudococcus aberrans
- Pseudococcus acirculus
- Pseudococcus affinis
- Pseudococcus africanus
- Pseudococcus agavis
- Pseudococcus agropyri
- Pseudococcus anestios
- Pseudococcus aneurae
- Pseudococcus angkorensis
- Pseudococcus antricolens
- Pseudococcus apomicrocirculus
- Pseudococcus araucariarum
- Pseudococcus aridorum
- Pseudococcus atalestus
- Pseudococcus baliteus
- Pseudococcus bambusicola
- Pseudococcus bambusifolii
- Pseudococcus barleriae
- Pseudococcus beardsleyi
- Pseudococcus bermudensis
- Pseudococcus bingervillensis
- Pseudococcus brevicornis
- Pseudococcus bryberia
- Pseudococcus calceolariae
- Pseudococcus callitris
- Pseudococcus capensis
- Pseudococcus caricus
- Pseudococcus carrietoniensis
- Pseudococcus carthami
- Pseudococcus casuarinae
- Pseudococcus chenopodii
- Pseudococcus cimensis
- Pseudococcus citriculus
- Pseudococcus colliculosus
- Pseudococcus comstocki
- Pseudococcus concavocerarii
- Pseudococcus cryptus
- Pseudococcus cunninghamii
- Pseudococcus darwiniensis
- Pseudococcus dasyliriae
- Pseudococcus daymananus
- Pseudococcus debregeasiae
- Pseudococcus defluiteri
- Pseudococcus dendrobiorum
- Pseudococcus dispar
- Pseudococcus diversus
- Pseudococcus dolichomelos
- Pseudococcus donrileyi
- Pseudococcus dorsospinosus
- Pseudococcus dybasi
- Pseudococcus dysmicus
- Pseudococcus edgeworthiae
- Pseudococcus elisae
- Pseudococcus elscholtriae
- Pseudococcus epidendrus
- Pseudococcus eremophilae
- Pseudococcus eremosus
- Pseudococcus eriocerei
- Pseudococcus espeletiae
- Pseudococcus eucalypticus
- Pseudococcus farnesianae
- Pseudococcus floriger
- Pseudococcus formicarius
- Pseudococcus galapagoensis
- Pseudococcus gallicola
- Pseudococcus gilbertensis
- Pseudococcus goodeniae
- Pseudococcus gouxi
- Pseudococcus graminivorus
- Pseudococcus grayi
- Pseudococcus hirsutus
- Pseudococcus hypergaeus
- Pseudococcus importatus
- Pseudococcus insularis
- Pseudococcus jackbeardsleyi
- Pseudococcus kawecki
- Pseudococcus kikuyuensis
- Pseudococcus kingii
- Pseudococcus kosztarabi
- Pseudococcus kozari
- Pseudococcus kraussi
- Pseudococcus kusaiensis
- Pseudococcus landoi
- Pseudococcus lepelleyi
- Pseudococcus linearis
- Pseudococcus longipes
- Pseudococcus longisetosus
- Pseudococcus longispinus
- Pseudococcus lycopodii
- Pseudococcus macrocirculus
- Pseudococcus macswaini
- Pseudococcus malacearum
- Pseudococcus mandio
- Pseudococcus maritimus
- Pseudococcus marshallensis
- Pseudococcus masakensis
- Pseudococcus mascarensis
- Pseudococcus megasetosus
- Pseudococcus mendiculus
- Pseudococcus microadonidum
- Pseudococcus microcirculus
- Pseudococcus microosteoli
- Pseudococcus mintaroicus
- Pseudococcus moldavicus
- Pseudococcus montanus
- Pseudococcus monticola
- Pseudococcus moribensis
- Pseudococcus multiductus
- Pseudococcus multiporus
- Pseudococcus nakaharai
- Pseudococcus neomaritimus
- Pseudococcus neomicrocirculus
- Pseudococcus nitidus
- Pseudococcus notabilis
- Pseudococcus nudus
- Pseudococcus obscurus
- Pseudococcus occiduus
- Pseudococcus odermatti
- Pseudococcus ogasawarensis
- Pseudococcus onustus
- Pseudococcus orchidicola
- Pseudococcus pahanensis
- Pseudococcus peregrinabundus
- Pseudococcus perforatus
- Pseudococcus pertusus
- Pseudococcus pipturicolus
- Pseudococcus pithecellobii
- Pseudococcus pittospori
- Pseudococcus portiludovici
- Pseudococcus prunicolus
- Pseudococcus pseudobscurus
- Pseudococcus pseudocitriculus
- Pseudococcus pseudofilamentosus
- Pseudococcus pseudoperrisii
- Pseudococcus puertoricensis
- Pseudococcus queenslandicus
- Pseudococcus quinyambiensis
- Pseudococcus saccharicola
- Pseudococcus savescui
- Pseudococcus schusteri
- Pseudococcus scrobicularum
- Pseudococcus similans
- Pseudococcus simplex
- Pseudococcus sociabilis
- Pseudococcus solani
- Pseudococcus solenedyos
- Pseudococcus solomonensis
- Pseudococcus sorghiellus
- Pseudococcus spanocera
- Pseudococcus sparsus
- Pseudococcus spathoglottidis
- Pseudococcus swezeyi
- Pseudococcus symoni
- Pseudococcus syringae
- Pseudococcus syzygii
- Pseudococcus theobromae
- Pseudococcus tirolensis
- Pseudococcus transylvanicus
- Pseudococcus trukensis
- Pseudococcus viburni
- Pseudococcus wachendorfiae
- Pseudococcus xanthorrhoeae
- Pseudococcus yapensis
- Pseudococcus zahradniki
- Pseudococcus zamiae
- Pseudococcus zelandicus

== Photos ==
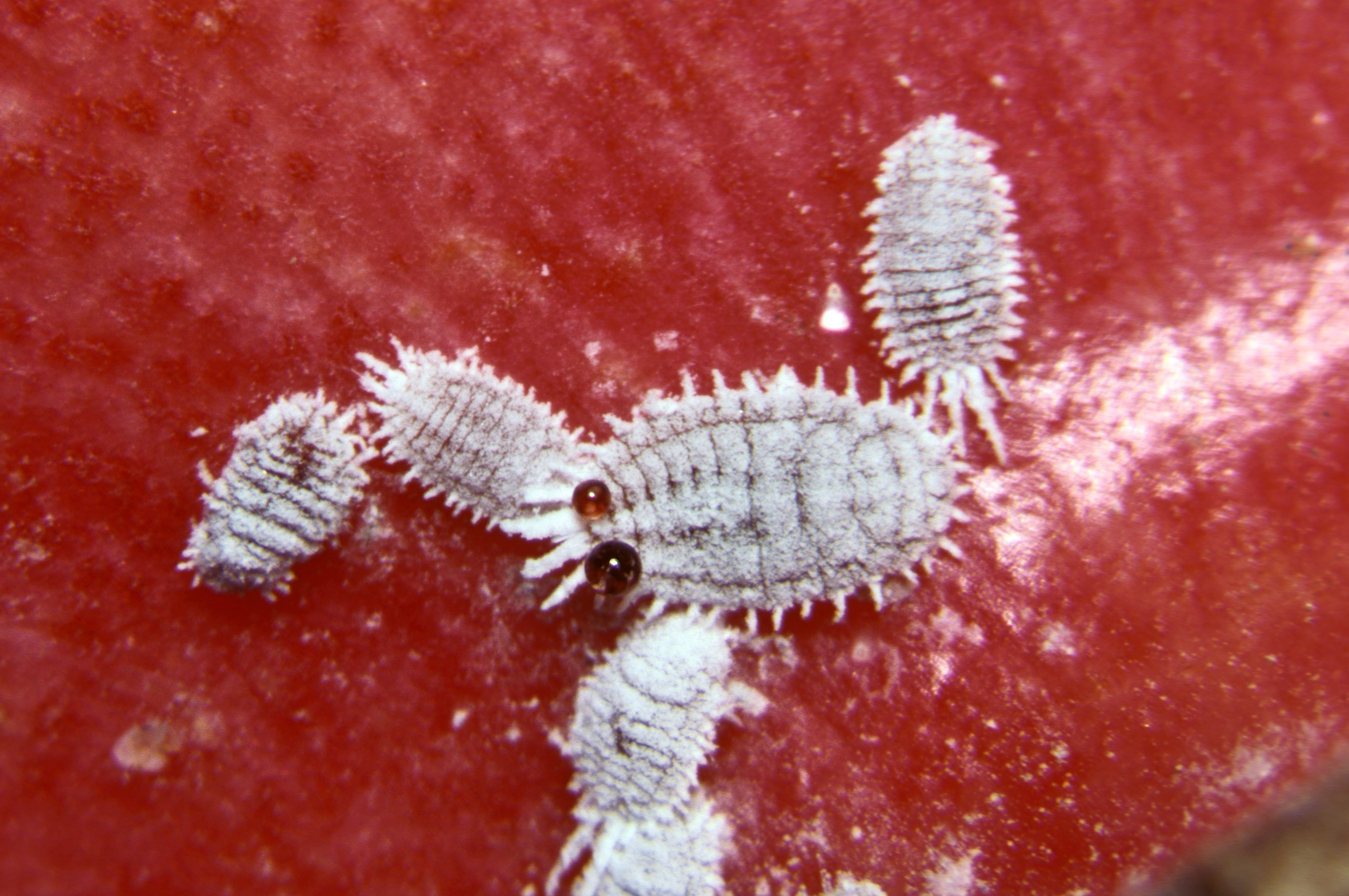
Citrophilius mealybug Pseudococcus calceolariae

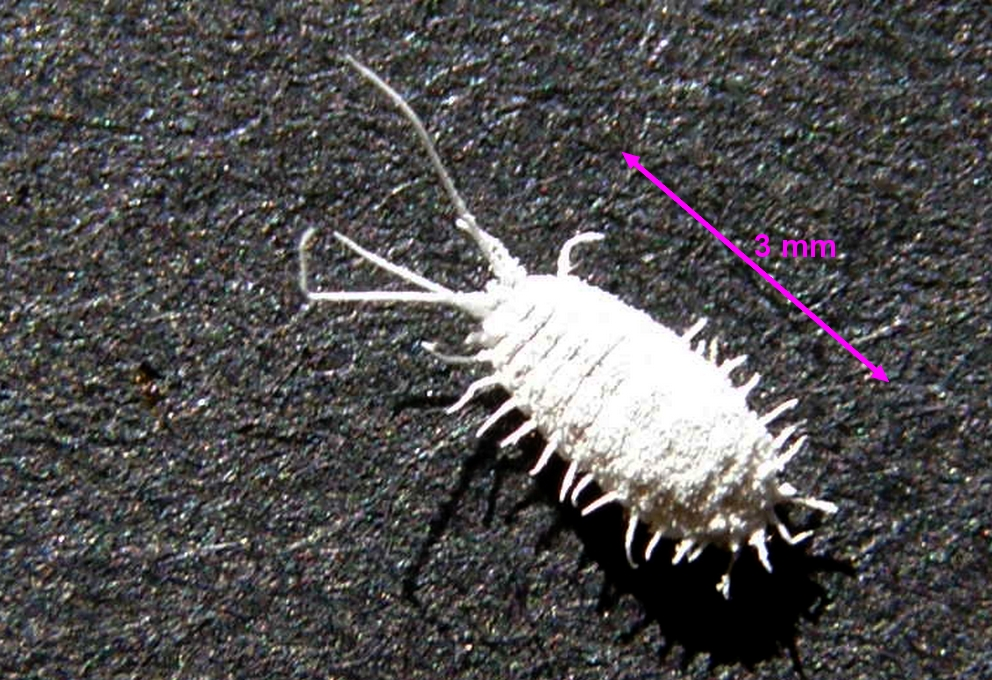
Pseudococcus viburni, female

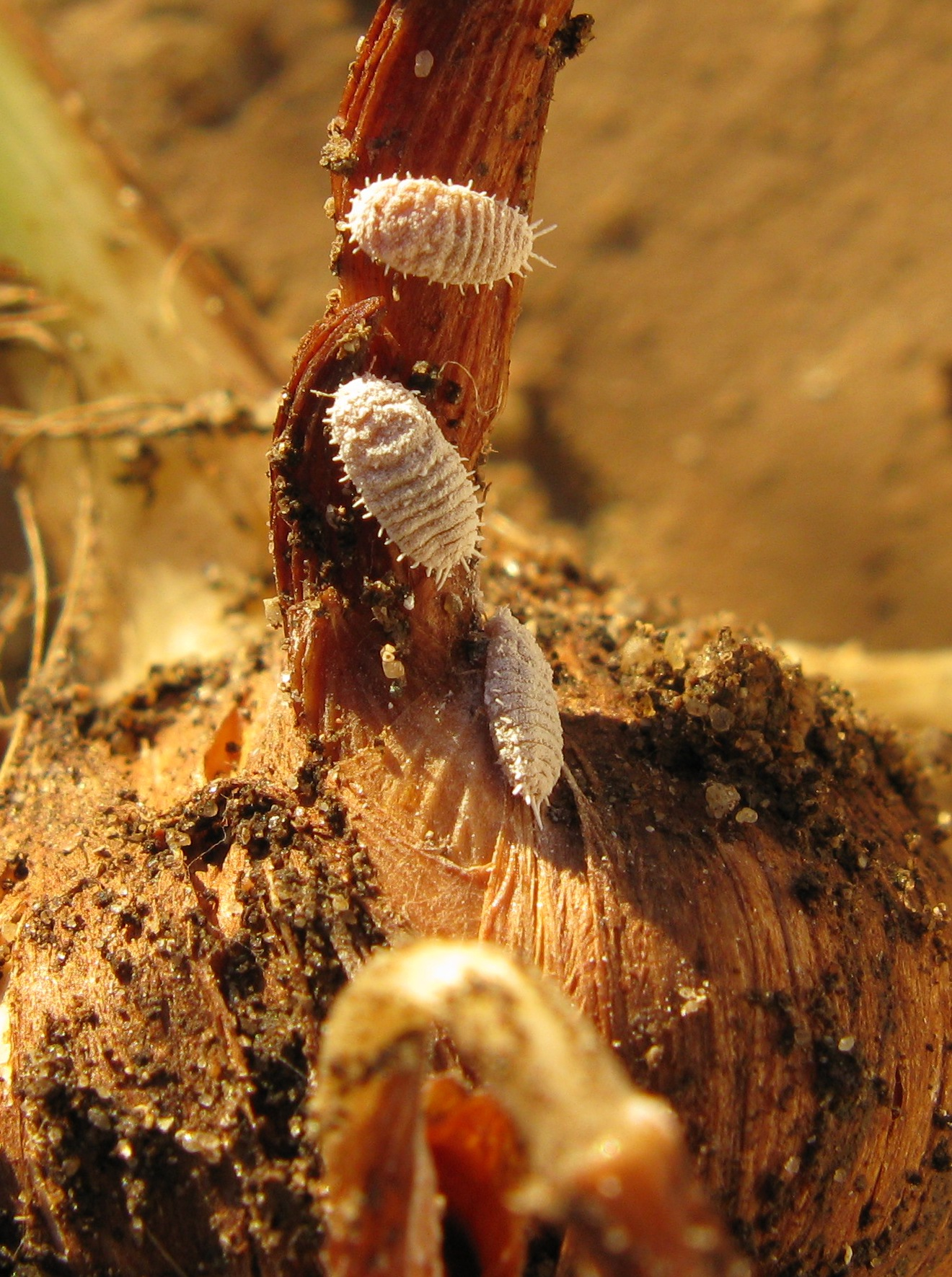
Pseudococcus species on Maize roots
