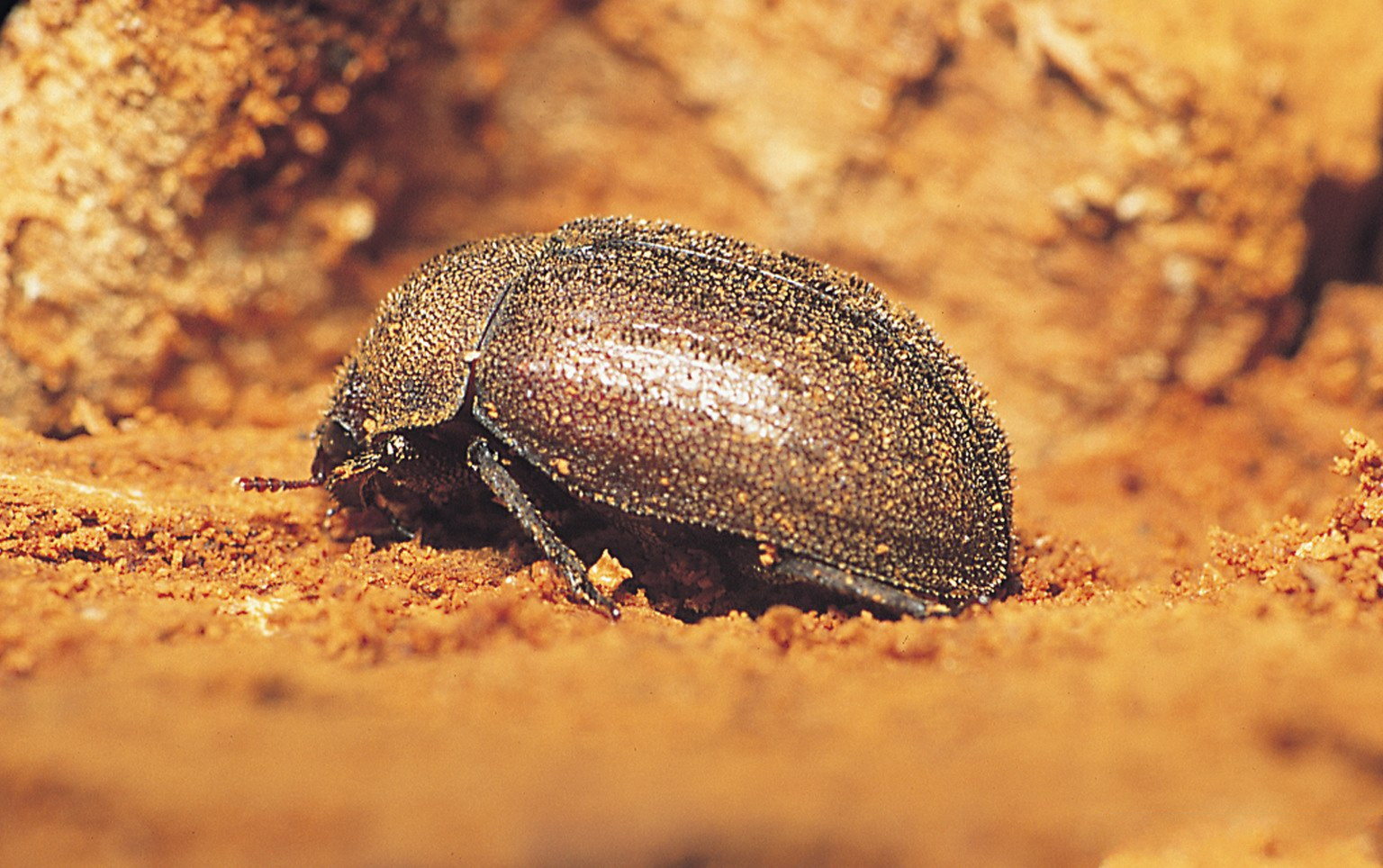
- Aesalus scarabaeoides

Scientific classification
- Kingdom: Animalia
- Phylum: Arthropoda
- Class: Insecta
- Order: Coleoptera
- Suborder: Polyphaga
- Infraorder: Scarabaeiformia
- Family: Lucanidae
- Subfamily: Aesalinae
- Tribe: Aesalini
- Genus: Aesalus (Fabricius, 1801)

= Aesalus =

Genus of beetles

Aesalus is a genus of Palaearctic and Oriental realm stag beetles, typical of the subfamily Aesalinae and tribe Aesalini; it was erected by Johan Christian Fabricius in 1801.

== Species ==
BioLib includes the following:

subgenus Aesalus Fabricius, 1801

1. Aesalus asiaticus Lewis, 1883
2. Aesalus scarabaeoides (Panzer, 1794)
3. Aesalus ulanovskii Ganglbauer, 1887 (also spelled A. ulanowskii)

subgenus Huaesalus Huang & Chen, 2017

1. Aesalus imanishii Inahara & Ratii, 1981
2. Aesalus leei Lin, 2025
3. Aesalus qiaoweipengi Huang, Yang & Chen, 2022
4. Aesalus sichuanensis Araya, Tanaka & Tanikado, 1995

unplaced species

1. Aesalus chungi Huang & Chen, 2015
2. Aesalus neotropicalis Bates, 1886
3. Aesalus smithi Bates, 1886
4. Aesalus trogoides Albers, 1883
