= Coccidiphila kasypinkeri =

Scientific classification
- Kingdom: Animalia
- Phylum: Arthropoda
- Class: Insecta
- Order: Lepidoptera
- Family: Cosmopterigidae
- Genus: Coccidiphila
- Species: C. kasypinkeri

Binomial name
- Coccidiphila kasypinkeri Traugott-Olsen, 1986

Species of moth

Coccidiphila kasypinkeri is a moth in the family Cosmopterigidae. It is found on the Canary Islands.

The wingspan is 6–7 mm (0.24–0.28 in). Adults have been recorded in January and March.
