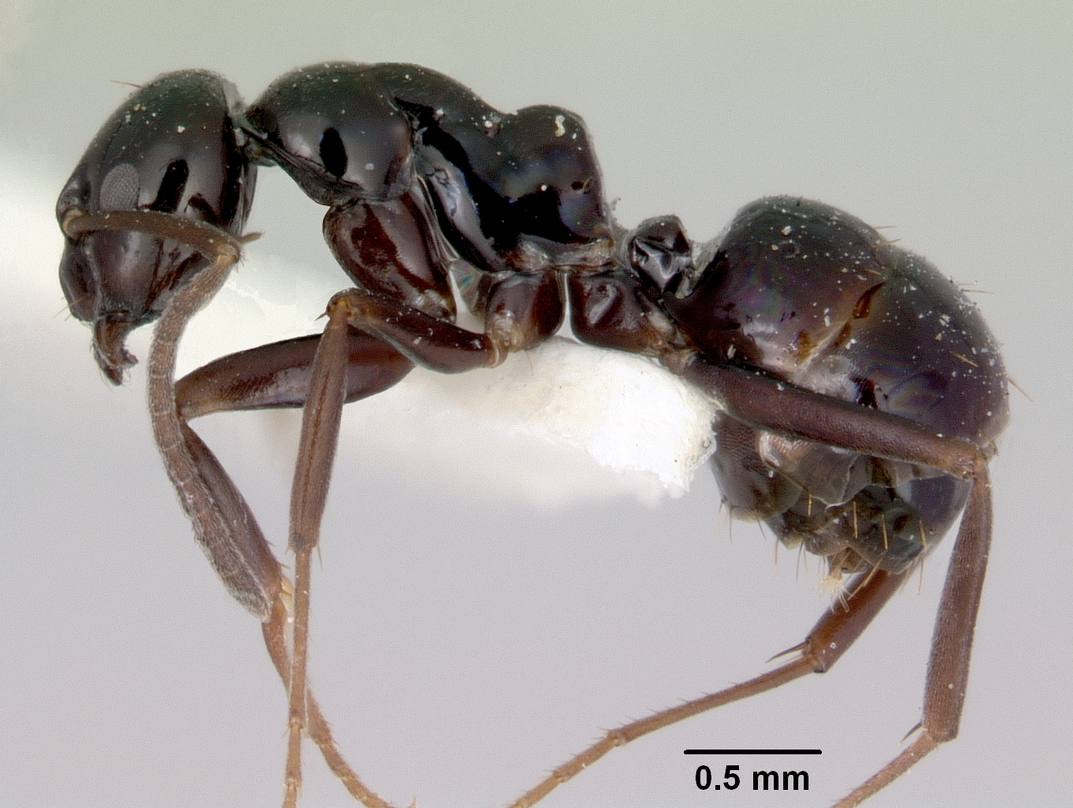
- Prolasius nitidissimus worker from Tasmania, Australia

Scientific classification
- Domain: Eukaryota
- Kingdom: Animalia
- Phylum: Arthropoda
- Class: Insecta
- Order: Hymenoptera
- Family: Formicidae
- Subfamily: Formicinae
- Tribe: Melophorini
- Genus: Prolasius; Forel, 1892

Type species
- Formica advena

Diversity
- 19 species

= Prolasius =

Genus of ants

Prolasius is a genus of ants in the subfamily Formicinae. Of the genus' 19 species, 18 are known from Australia (one of which is also found in Papua New Guinea) and one from New Zealand. They nest in soil under rocks or logs, sometimes in trees.

== Species ==
- Prolasius abruptus Clark, 1934
- Prolasius advenus (Smith, F., 1862)
- Prolasius antennatus McAreavey, 1947
- Prolasius bruneus McAreavey, 1947
- Prolasius clarki McAreavey, 1947
- Prolasius convexus McAreavey, 1947
- Prolasius depressiceps (Emery, 1914)
- Prolasius flavicornis Clark, 1934
- Prolasius formicoides (Forel, 1902)
- Prolasius hellenae McAreavey, 1947
- Prolasius hemiflavus Clark, 1934
- Prolasius mjoebergella (Forel, 1916)
- Prolasius nitidissimus (André, 1896)
- Prolasius pallidus Clark, 1934
- Prolasius quadratus McAreavey, 1947
- Prolasius reticulatus McAreavey, 1947
- Prolasius robustus McAreavey, 1947
- Prolasius wheeleri McAreavey, 1947
- Prolasius wilsoni McAreavey, 1947
