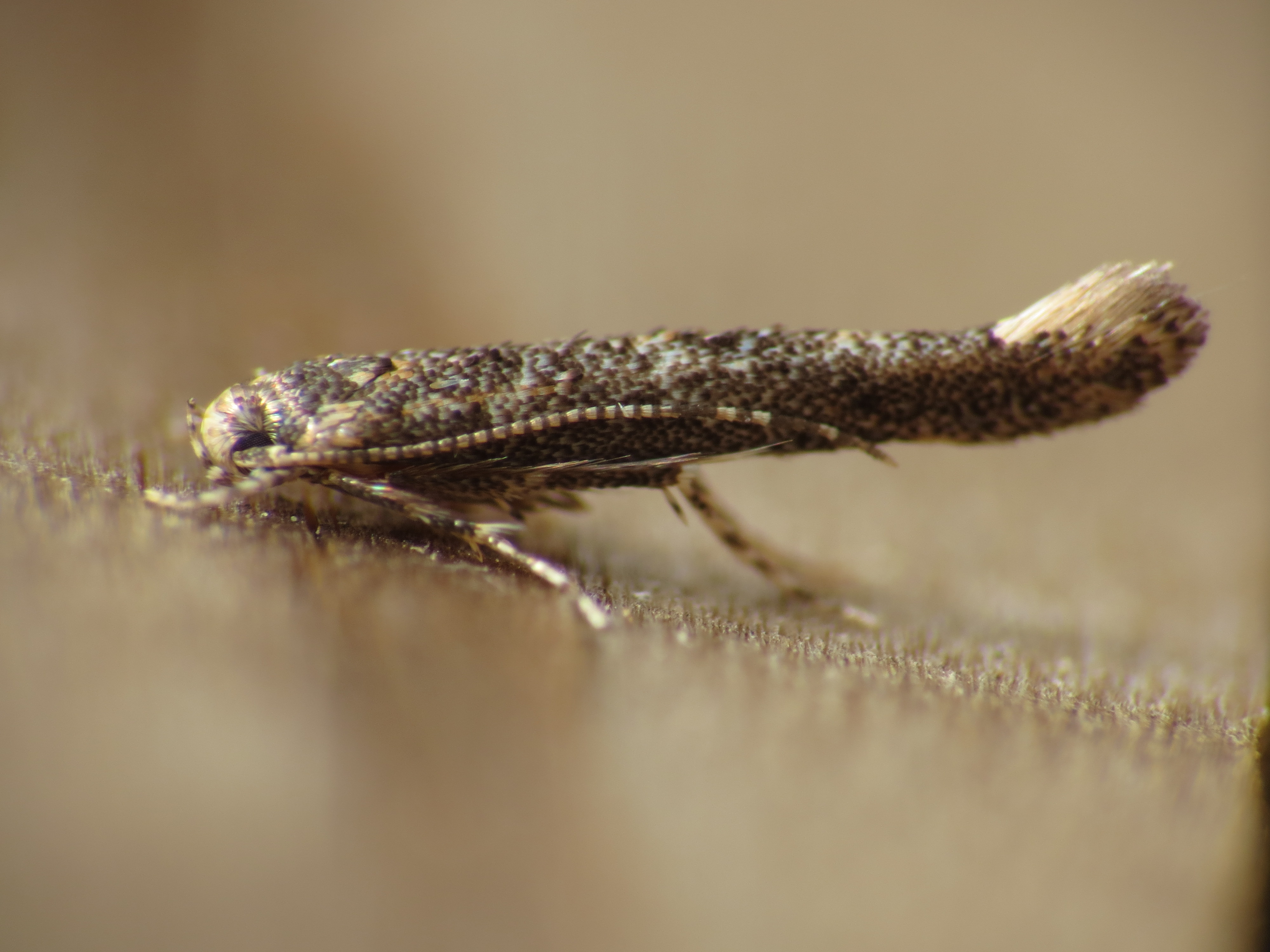

Scientific classification
- Domain: Eukaryota
- Kingdom: Animalia
- Phylum: Arthropoda
- Class: Insecta
- Order: Lepidoptera
- Family: Cosmopterigidae
- Genus: Coccidiphila
- Species: C. gerasimovi

Binomial name
- Coccidiphila gerasimovi Danilevsky, 1950

= Coccidiphila gerasimovi =

Species of moth

Coccidiphila gerasimovi is a moth in the family Cosmopterigidae described by Aleksandr Sergeievich Danilevsky in 1950. It is found in the Mediterranean area, on the Canary Islands and from North Africa to the Near East. It has also been recorded from Sudan, Iran, Saudi Arabia and the United Arab Emirates.

The wingspan is 7–11 mm (0.28–0.43 in). Adults are on wing from early March to October. There are probably more than one generations per year.

The larvae feed on the eggs of Coccidae species, including Pseudococcus maritimus, Laccifer lacca, Leucanium prunastri and Aonidella citrina.
