= Coccidiphila danilevskyi =

Scientific classification
- Kingdom: Animalia
- Phylum: Arthropoda
- Clade: Pancrustacea
- Class: Insecta
- Order: Lepidoptera
- Family: Cosmopterigidae
- Genus: Coccidiphila
- Species: C. danilevskyi

Binomial name
- Coccidiphila danilevskyi Sinev, 1997

Synonyms
- Coccidiphila rungsiella Nel & Brusseaux 1997

Species of moth

Coccidiphila danilevskyi is a moth in the family Cosmopterigidae. It is found in France, Spain, Portugal, Morocco and Tunisia.

The wingspan is 7–10 mm (0.28–0.39 in). Adults are on wing from May to September in Europe. In North Africa, adults have been recorded in February (in Morocco) and from September to October (in Tunisia). There are probably two generations per year.
