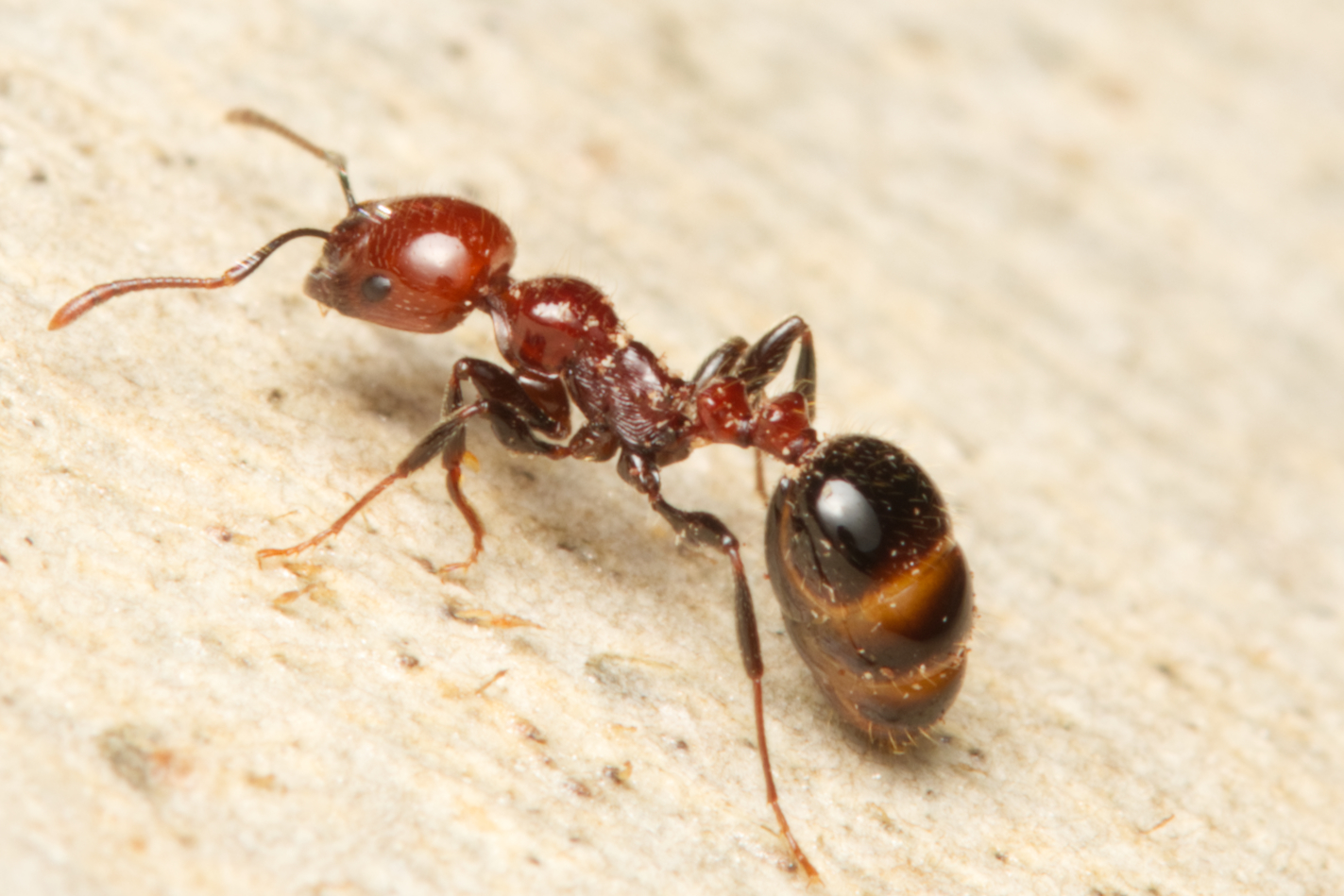
- Chelaner rubriceps

Scientific classification
- Kingdom: Animalia
- Phylum: Arthropoda
- Class: Insecta
- Order: Hymenoptera
- Family: Formicidae
- Subfamily: Myrmicinae
- Tribe: Solenopsidini
- Genus: Chelaner; Emery, 1914

Type species
- Chelaner forcipatum Emery, 1921 by subsequent designation

= Chelaner =

Genus of ants

Chelaner is a genus of ants in the subfamily Myrmicinae.

== Taxonomy ==
By the early 20th century, the genus Monomorium was already large, with 10 subgenera. In 2019, Chelaner was resurrected for 53 Australasian and Pacific species, including the common New Zealand species Chelaner antarcticus. This split has been recognized by some authorities.

== Selected species ==
- Chelaner antarcticus
