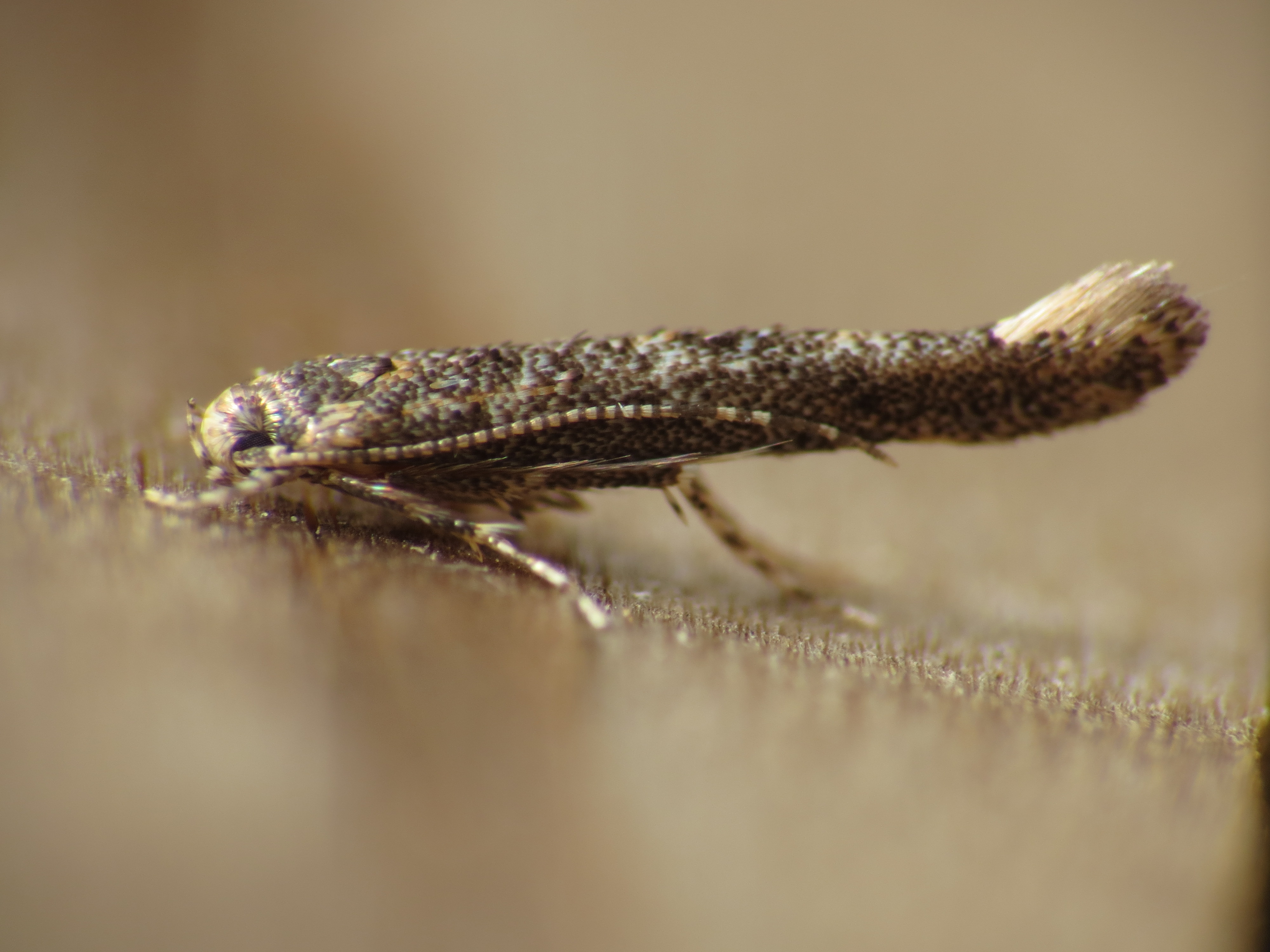
- Coccidiphila gerasimovi

Scientific classification
- Kingdom: Animalia
- Phylum: Arthropoda
- Class: Insecta
- Order: Lepidoptera
- Family: Cosmopterigidae
- Subfamily: Cosmopteriginae
- Genus: Coccidiphila; Danilevsky, 1950

Synonyms
- Batrachedropsis Amsel, 1955

= Coccidiphila =

Genus of moths

Coccidiphila is a genus of moths in the family Cosmopterigidae.

== Species ==
- Coccidiphila danilevskyi Sinev, 1997 (from Europe and North Africa)
- Coccidiphila gerasimovi Danilevsky, 1950 (Mediterranean area, Canaries, Caucasus)
- Coccidiphila kasypinkeri Traugott-Olsen, 1986 (from the Canaries)
- Coccidiphila ledereriella (Zeller, 1850) (Southern Europe and South Africa)
- Coccidiphila nivea Koster, 2010 (from the United Arab Emirates)
- Coccidiphila patriciae Nel & Nel, 2000 (from the Canaries)
- Coccidiphila riedli Traugott-Olsen, 1986 (from the Canaries)
- Coccidiphila silvatica (Meyrick, 1917) (India, Kumaon)
- Coccidiphila stegodyphobius (Walsingham, 1903) (from South Africa)
- Coccidiphila violenta (Meyrick, 1916) (Guyana)
