= Coccidiphila silvatica =

Scientific classification
- Kingdom: Animalia
- Phylum: Arthropoda
- Class: Insecta
- Order: Lepidoptera
- Family: Cosmopterigidae
- Genus: Coccidiphila
- Species: C. silvatica

Binomial name
- Coccidiphila silvatica (Meyrick, 1917)

Synonyms
- Batrachedra silvatica Meyrick, 1917

Species of moth

Coccidiphila silvatica is a moth in the family Cosmopterigidae. It was described by Edward Meyrick in 1917. It is found in Kumaon division, India. The larvae have been recorded feeding on Pinus roxburghii and mealybugs.

This species has a wingspan of 7–8 mm (0.28–0.31 in). The forewings are white, irrorated (sprinkled) with dark fuscous, appearing grey.
