= Coccidiphila ledereriella =

Scientific classification
- Kingdom: Animalia
- Phylum: Arthropoda
- Clade: Pancrustacea
- Class: Insecta
- Order: Lepidoptera
- Family: Cosmopterigidae
- Genus: Coccidiphila
- Species: C. ledereriella

Binomial name
- Coccidiphila ledereriella (Zeller, 1850)

Synonyms
- Cosmopteryx ledereriella Zeller, 1850; Batrachedra ledereriella Meyrick, 1918; Teleia unedella Milliere, 1875

Species of moth

Coccidiphila ledereriella is a moth in the family Cosmopterigidae. It is found in Southern Europe and on Malta, Sardinia and possibly the Canary Islands, North Africa and Asia Minor.

The wingspan is 8–10 mm (0.31–0.39 in). There are multiple generations per year. Adults are generally on wing from the beginning of April to the end of September.

The larvae feed on insect remains, found in spider webs or nest of Lepidoptera larvae. They have also been recorded feeding on dried plant material and galls on various plants.
