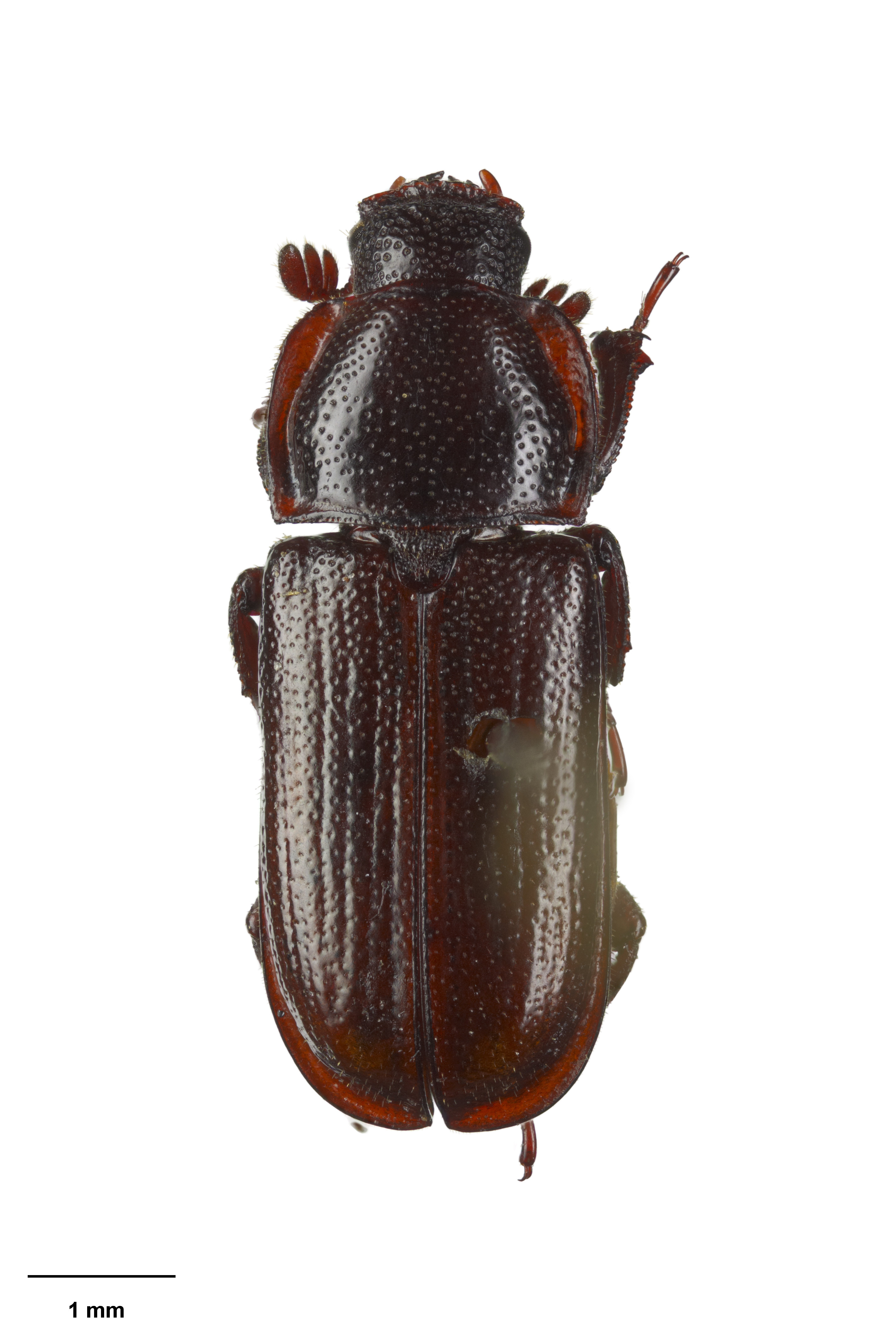
- Holloceratognathus passaliformis

Scientific classification
- Kingdom: Animalia
- Phylum: Arthropoda
- Class: Insecta
- Order: Coleoptera
- Suborder: Polyphaga
- Infraorder: Scarabaeiformia
- Family: Lucanidae
- Subfamily: Aesalinae
- Genus: Holloceratognathus; Nikolaev, 1998

= Holloceratognathus =

Species of beetle

Holloceratognathus is a genus of stag beetle endemic to New Zealand.

== Species ==
There are three currently accepted species:

- Holloceratognathus cylindricus
- Holloceratognathus helotoides
- Holloceratognathus passaliformis
