= Coccidiphila riedli =

Scientific classification
- Kingdom: Animalia
- Phylum: Arthropoda
- Class: Insecta
- Order: Lepidoptera
- Family: Cosmopterigidae
- Genus: Coccidiphila
- Species: C. riedli

Binomial name
- Coccidiphila riedli Traugott-Olsen, 1986

Species of moth

Coccidiphila riedli is a moth in the family Cosmopterigidae. It is found on the Canary Islands.

The wingspan is 6–9 mm (0.24–0.35 in). Adults have been recorded from February to April.

Larvae have been found between dead leaves of Ceballosia fruticosa. They possibly also feed on Plumbago capensis.
