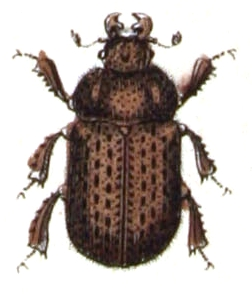
- Aesalus.scarabaeoides

Scientific classification
- Kingdom: Animalia
- Phylum: Arthropoda
- Clade: Pancrustacea
- Class: Insecta
- Order: Coleoptera
- Suborder: Polyphaga
- Infraorder: Scarabaeiformia
- Superfamily: Scarabaeoidea
- Family: Lucanidae
- Subfamily: Aesalinae; MacLeay, 1819

= Aesalinae =

Subfamily of beetles

The Aesalinae are a subfamily of the stag beetle (Lucanidae) genera: based on the type genus Aesalus and included in William Sharp Macleay's first major work of 1819.

== Tribes and genera ==
BioLib includes three tribes:

=== Aesalini ===
Authority: MacLeay, 1819

1. Aesalus Fabricius, 1801
2. Echinoaesalus Zelenka, 1993
3. Himaloaesalus Huang & Chen, 2013
4. Lucanobium Howden & Lawrence, 1974
5. Strabaesalus Paulsen, 2018
6. Trogellus Paulsen, 2013
7. Zelenkaesalus Krikken, 2008

Fossil genera

1. †Cretaesalus Nikolajev, 1993
2. †Juraesalus Nikolajev, Wang, Liu & Zhang, 2011
3. †Sinaesalus Nikolajev, Wang, Liu & Zhang, 2011

=== Ceratognathini ===
Authority: Sharp, 1899

1. Ceratognathus Westwood, 1838
2. Hilophyllus Paulsen & Mondaca, 2006
3. Holloceratognathus Nikolajev, 1998
4. Mitophyllus Parry, 1843

Fossil genera

1. †Electraesalopsis Bai, Zhang & Qiu, 2017
2. †Oncelytris Li & Cai, 2023
3. †Protonicagus Cai et al., 2017

=== Nicagini ===
Authority: LeConte, 1861

1. Nicagus LeConte, 1861
