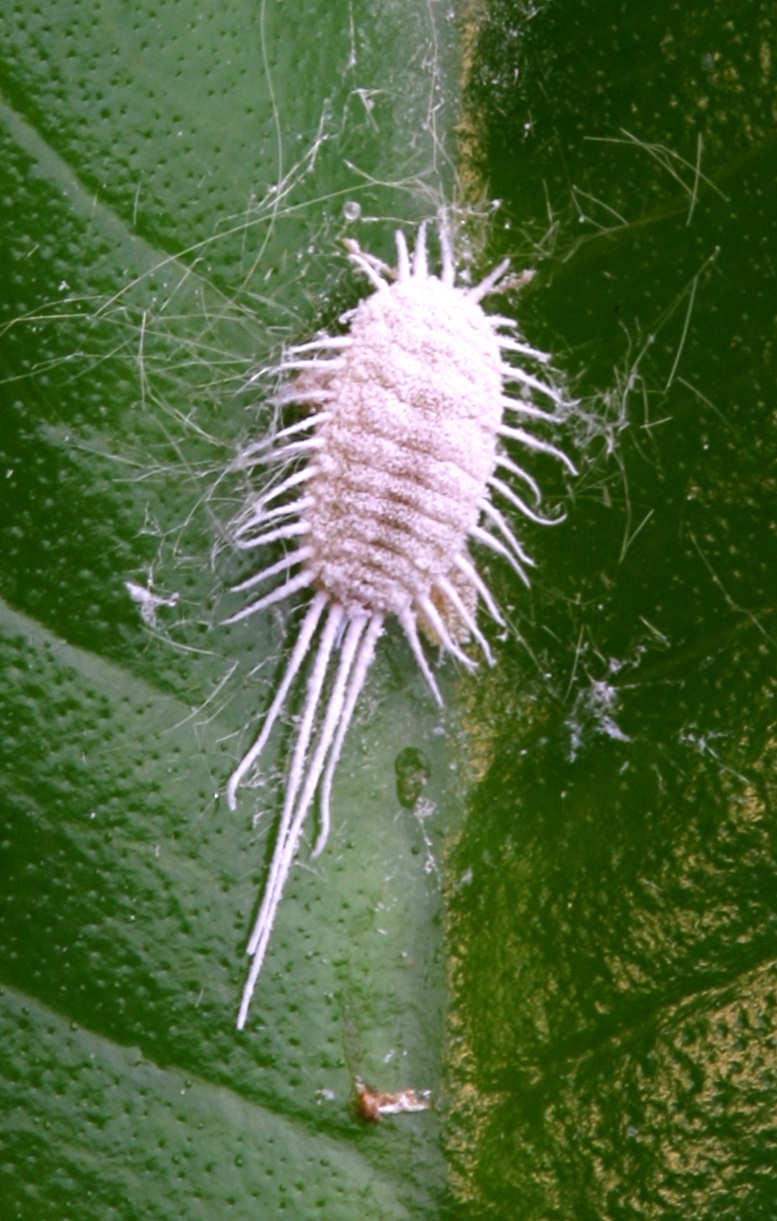

Scientific classification
- Domain: Eukaryota
- Kingdom: Animalia
- Phylum: Arthropoda
- Class: Insecta
- Order: Hemiptera
- Suborder: Sternorrhyncha
- Family: Pseudococcidae
- Genus: Pseudococcus
- Species: P. longispinus

Binomial name
- Pseudococcus longispinus (Targioni Tozzetti, 1867)

= Pseudococcus longispinus =

Species of true bug

Pseudococcus longispinus, the long-tailed mealybug, is a species of mealybug in the family Pseudococcidae.
