= Coccidiphila nivea =

Scientific classification
- Kingdom: Animalia
- Phylum: Arthropoda
- Clade: Pancrustacea
- Class: Insecta
- Order: Lepidoptera
- Family: Cosmopterigidae
- Genus: Coccidiphila
- Species: C. nivea

Binomial name
- Coccidiphila nivea Koster, 2010

Species of moth

Coccidiphila nivea is a moth in the family Cosmopterigidae. It is found in the United Arab Emirates.

The wingspan is about 8.5 mm (0.33 in).
