= Pseudococcus maritimus =

Scientific classification
- Domain: Eukaryota
- Kingdom: Animalia
- Phylum: Arthropoda
- Class: Insecta
- Order: Hemiptera
- Suborder: Sternorrhyncha
- Family: Pseudococcidae
- Genus: Pseudococcus
- Species: P. maritimus

Binomial name
- Pseudococcus maritimus (Ehrhorn, 1900)

Species of true bug

Pseudococcus maritimus, the grape mealybug, is a scale insect species in the genus Pseudococcus infecting grapevines. It is also a vector of little cherry disease.

The larvae of the moth Coccidiphila gerasimovi feed on the eggs of Coccidae species, including P. maritimus.
