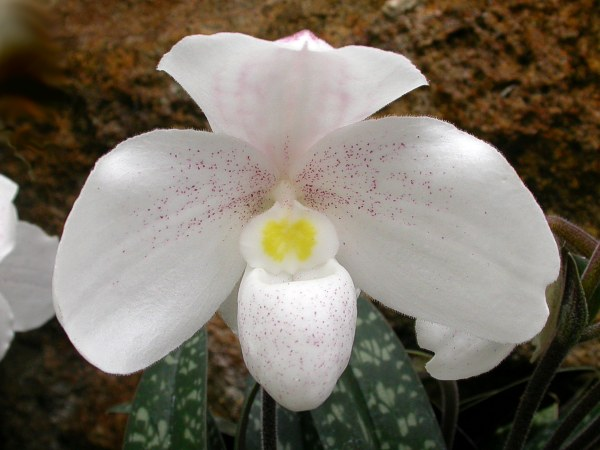
- Flower of Paphiopedilum niveum

Scientific classification
- Kingdom: Plantae
- Clade: Tracheophytes
- Clade: Angiosperms
- Clade: Monocots
- Order: Asparagales
- Family: Orchidaceae
- Subfamily: Cypripedioideae
- Genus: Paphiopedilum
- Species: P. niveum

Binomial name
- Paphiopedilum niveum (Rchb.f.) Stein

Synonyms
- Cypripedium niveum Rchb.f. (basionym); Cordula nivea (Rchb.f.) Rolfe; Cypripedium niveum var. album auct.; Paphiopedilum niveum f. album (auct.) O.Gruss

= Paphiopedilum niveum =

Species of orchid

Paphiopedilum niveum is a species of orchid occurring from peninsular Thailand to peninsular Malaysia. It is best known on Pulau Langkawi, a group of islands off the coast of Peninsular Malaysia. Over-collecting from these islands has made the species quite scarce. This orchid grows in cracks on limestone cliffs just above sea level. It is small, only 10 cm across, with flowers that are 5–6 cm across. It flowers from December to August, peaking in April and May. This orchid, and the Thai variety, Paph. niveum var. Ang Thong, have been hybridised extensively, and are easy to grow.
