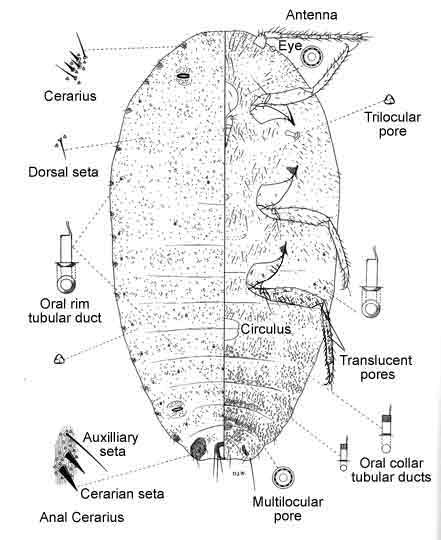
- Pseudococcus calceolariae Illustration by Douglas Williams

Scientific classification
- Domain: Eukaryota
- Kingdom: Animalia
- Phylum: Arthropoda
- Class: Insecta
- Order: Hemiptera
- Suborder: Sternorrhyncha
- Family: Pseudococcidae
- Genus: Pseudococcus
- Species: P. calceolariae

Binomial name
- Pseudococcus calceolariae Maskell (1879)

= Pseudococcus calceolariae =

Species of true bug

Pseudococcus calceolariae is a species of mealybug broadly similar to other species of Pseudococcus.

== Description ==
The body outline of the female is elongate-oval to oval, and all stages are covered with a rather coarse, powdery, white wax.

== Range ==
It has been found on every continent except Antarctica.

== Hosts ==
Pseudococcus calceolariae has been found on as many as 46 families and 89 genera of plants.

== Synonyms ==
- Dactylopius calceolariae (Maskell, 1879); accepted valid name
- Dactylopius similans (Lidgett, 1898); junior synonym
- Pseudococcus calceolariae (Maskell, 1879); Fernald 1903b: 98. change of combination
- Pseudococcus similans (Lidgett, 1898); Fernald 1903b: 109. change of combination
- Pseudococcus fragilis (Brainm, 1912); junior synonym.
- Pseudococcus citrophilus (Clausen, 1915); junior synonym.
- Pseudococcus gahani Green 1915a: 179. junior synonym.
- Erium calceolariae (Maskell, 1879); Lindinger 1935a: 122. change of combination
