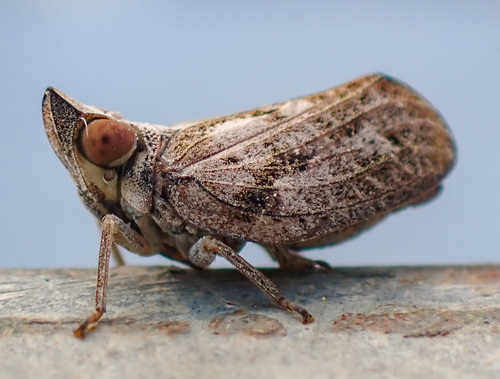

Scientific classification
- Kingdom: Animalia
- Phylum: Arthropoda
- Class: Insecta
- Order: Hemiptera
- Suborder: Auchenorrhyncha
- Infraorder: Fulgoromorpha
- Family: Issidae
- Tribe: Thioniini
- Subtribe: Thioniina
- Genus: Fowlerium
- Species: F. acutum

Binomial name
- Fowlerium acutum (Doering, 1941)

Synonyms
- Thionia acuta Doering, 1941

= Fowlerium acutum =

Species of planthopper

Fowlerium acutum is a species of planthopper in the family Issidae. They are native to central Texas and Oklahoma.
