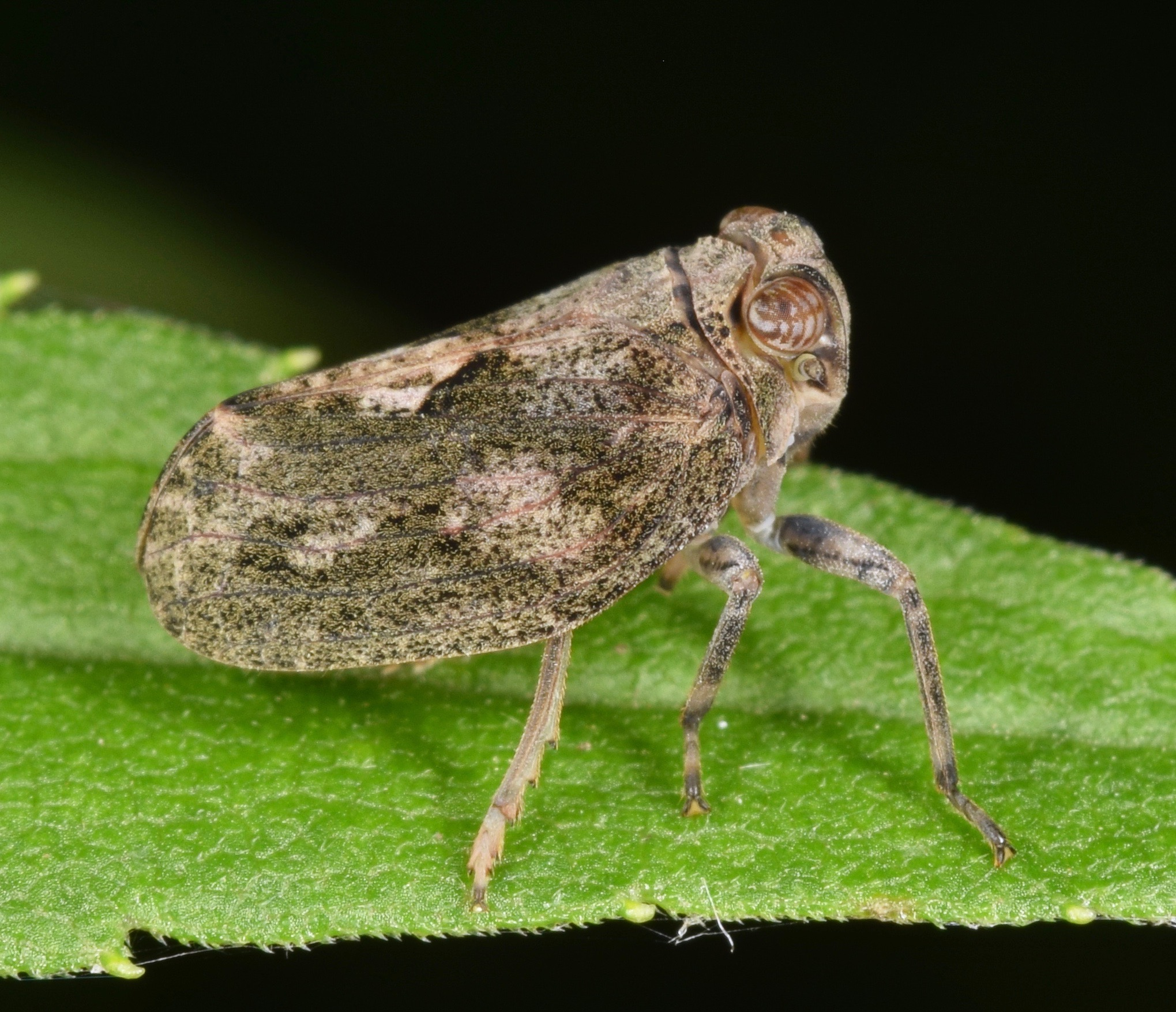

Scientific classification
- Kingdom: Animalia
- Phylum: Arthropoda
- Class: Insecta
- Order: Hemiptera
- Suborder: Auchenorrhyncha
- Infraorder: Fulgoromorpha
- Family: Issidae
- Tribe: Thioniini
- Subtribe: Thioniina
- Genus: Thionia
- Species: T. elliptica

Binomial name
- Thionia elliptica (Germar, 1830)

= Thionia elliptica =

Species of planthopper

Thionia elliptica is a species of issid planthopper in the family Issidae.
