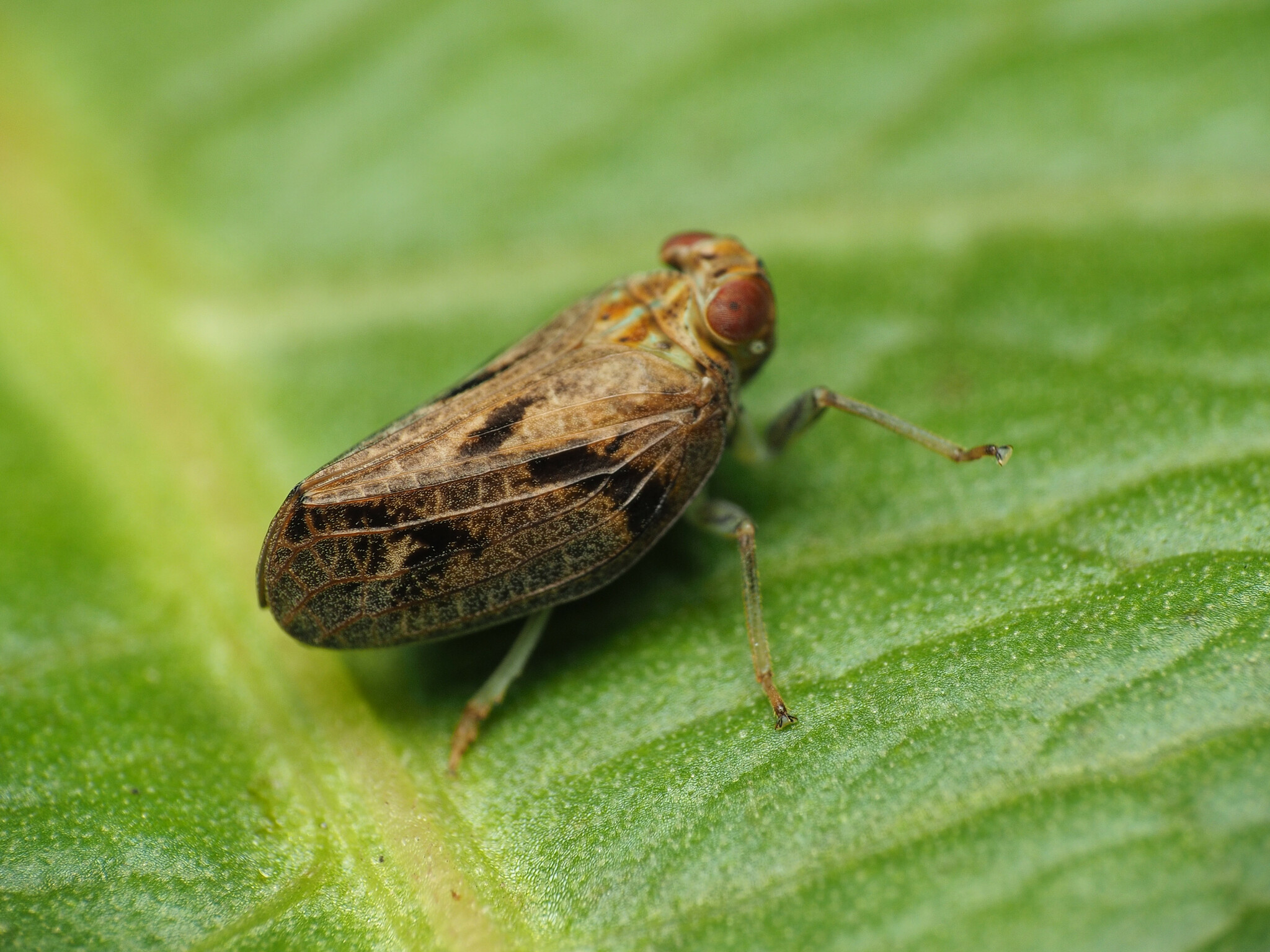

Scientific classification
- Kingdom: Animalia
- Phylum: Arthropoda
- Class: Insecta
- Order: Hemiptera
- Suborder: Auchenorrhyncha
- Infraorder: Fulgoromorpha
- Family: Issidae
- Tribe: Thioniini
- Subtribe: Thioniina
- Genus: Thionia
- Species: T. bullata

Binomial name
- Thionia bullata (Say, 1830)

= Thionia bullata =

Species of planthopper

Thionia bullata is a species of issid planthopper in the family Issidae. It can be found in the United States. Pine trees, specifically Pinus taeda, Pinus echinata, and Pinus virginiana species, are its host plant.

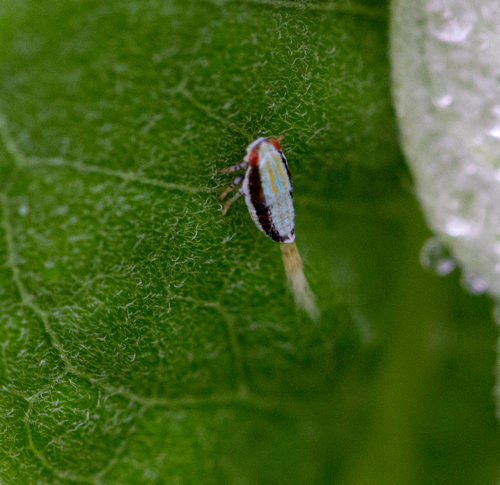
Thionia bullata nymph
