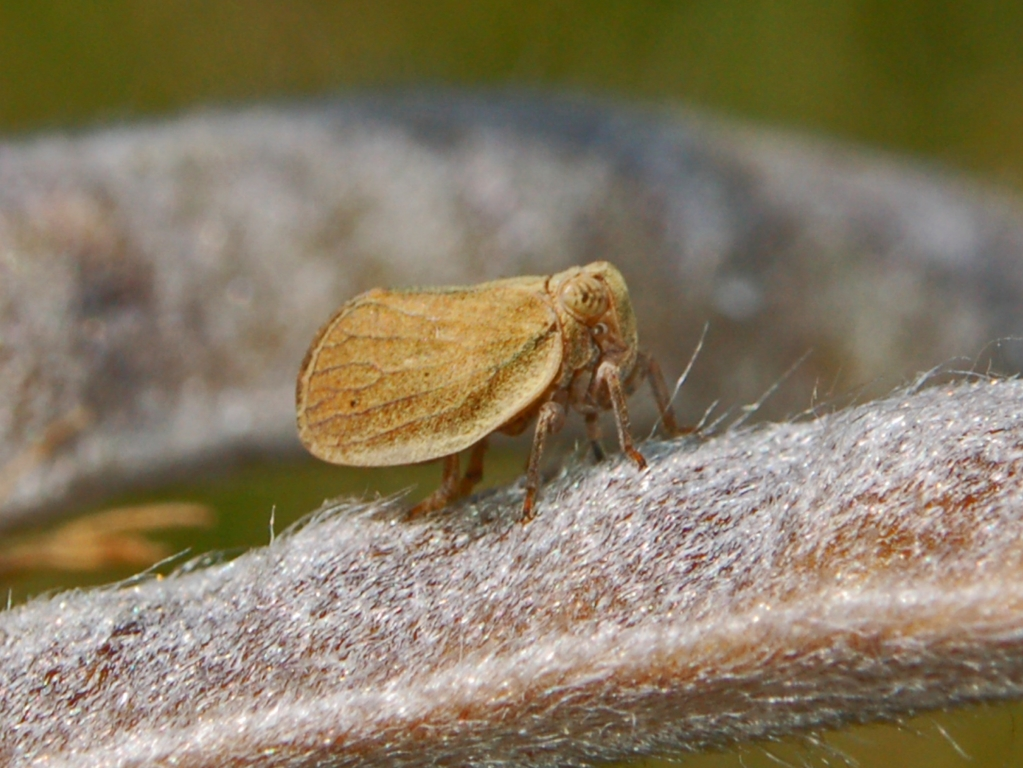
- Hysteropterum species

Scientific classification
- Domain: Eukaryota
- Kingdom: Animalia
- Phylum: Arthropoda
- Class: Insecta
- Order: Hemiptera
- Suborder: Auchenorrhyncha
- Infraorder: Fulgoromorpha
- Family: Issidae
- Subfamily: Hysteropterinae; Melichar, 1906

Type genus
- Hysteropterum Amyot & Audinet-Serville, 1843

= Hysteropterinae =

Subfamily of true bugs

The Hysteropterinae are a subfamily of bugs in the family Issidae, based on the type genus Hysteropterum. Species in 59 genera have been recorded in Europe, Africa, and Asia. One species, Agalmatium bilobum, is now also found as an invasive species in the United States, especially in California.

== Genera ==
- Acrestia Dlabola, 1980
- Agalmatium Emeljanov, 1971
- Alloscelis Kusnezov, 1930
- Anatolodus Dlabola, 1982
- Anatonga Emeljanov, 2001
- Apedalmus Gnezdilov, 2016
- Atticus Gnezdilov, 2003
- Bergevinium Gnezdilov, 2003
- Bootheca Emeljanov, 1964
- Brachyprosopa Kusnezov, 1929
- Bubastia Emeljanov, 1975
- Caepovultus Gnezdilov & Wilson, 2007
- Cavatorium Dlabola, 1980
- Celyphoma Emeljanov, 1971
- Clybeccus Gnezdilov, 2003
- Conosimus Mulsant & Rey, 1855
- Corymbius Gnezdilov, 2002
- †Cubicostissus Bourgoin & Nel, 2020 Menat Formation, France, Paleocene (Selandian)
- Falcidius Stål, 1866
- Fieberium Dlabola, 1980
- Granadus Gnezdilov & Den Bieman, 2018
- Granum Gnezdilov, 2003
- Hysteropterum Amyot & Audinet-Serville, 1843 – type genus
- Iberanum Gnezdilov, 2003
- Inflatodus Dlabola, 1982
- Iranodus Dlabola, 1980
- Kervillea de Bergevin, 1918
- Kovacsiana Synave, 1956
- Latematium Dlabola, 1979
- Latilica Emeljanov, 1971
- Lethierium Dlabola, 1980
- Libanissum Dlabola, 1980
- Lindbergatium Dlabola, 1984
- Lusanda Stål, 1859
- Montissus Gnezdilov, 2003
- Mulsantereum Gnezdilov, 2002
- Mycterodus Spinola, 1839
- Numidius Gnezdilov, Guglielmino & D'Urso, 2003
- Palaeolithium Gnezdilov, 2003
- Palmallorcus Gnezdilov, 2003
- Pamphylium Gnezdilov & Wilson, 2007
- Pavelauterum Gnezdilov, 2013
- Pentissus Dlabola, 1980
- Phasmena Melichar, 1902
- Planocostium Dlabola, 1982
- Potaninum Gnezdilov, 2017
- Pseudohemisphaerius Melichar, 1906
- Qadriva Ghauri, 1965
- Rhissolepus Emeljanov, 1971
- Scorlupaster Emeljanov, 1971
- Scorlupella Emeljanov, 1971
- Semissus Melichar, 1906
- Sfaxia de Bergevin, 1917
- Tautoprosopa Emeljanov, 1978
- Thalassana Gnezdilov, 2016
- Tingissus Gnezdilov, 2003
- Tshurtshurnella Kusnezov, 1927
- Webbisanus Dlabola, 1983
- Zopherisca Emeljanov, 2001
