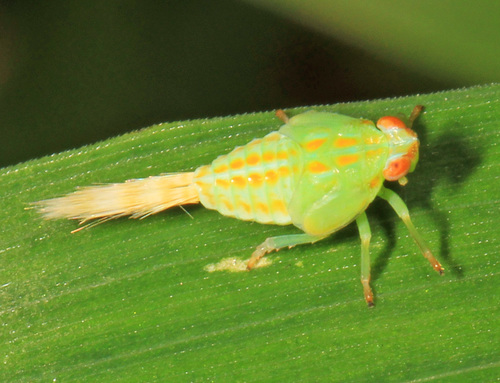
- Nymph stage

Scientific classification
- Kingdom: Animalia
- Phylum: Arthropoda
- Class: Insecta
- Order: Hemiptera
- Suborder: Auchenorrhyncha
- Infraorder: Fulgoromorpha
- Family: Issidae
- Tribe: Thioniini
- Subtribe: Thioniina
- Genus: Thionia
- Species: T. quinquata

Binomial name
- Thionia quinquata Metcalf, 1923

Synonyms
- Thionia quinata Brimley, 1938

= Thionia quinquata =

Species of planthopper

Thionia quinquata is a species of issid planthopper in the family Issidae.
