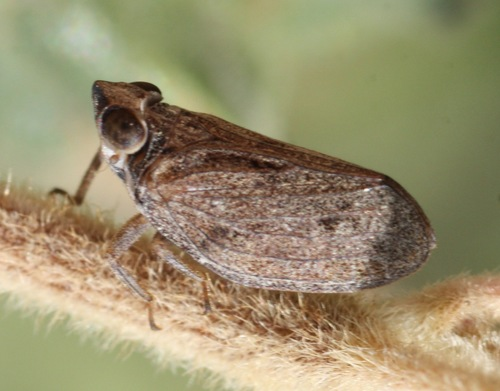

Scientific classification
- Domain: Eukaryota
- Kingdom: Animalia
- Phylum: Arthropoda
- Class: Insecta
- Order: Hemiptera
- Suborder: Auchenorrhyncha
- Infraorder: Fulgoromorpha
- Family: Issidae
- Tribe: Thioniini
- Subtribe: Thioniina
- Genus: Fowlerium
- Species: F. productum

Binomial name
- Fowlerium productum (Van Duzee, 1908)

Synonyms
- Thionia producta Van Duzee, 1908

= Fowlerium productum =

Species of planthopper

Fowlerium productum is a species of planthopper in the family Issidae. They are native to the Southwestern United States.
