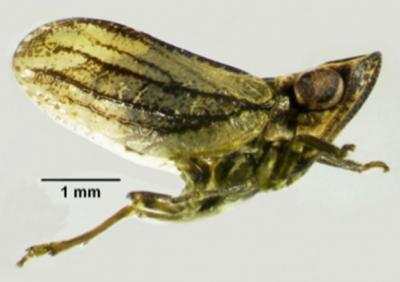
- Female C. baenai

Scientific classification
- Domain: Eukaryota
- Kingdom: Animalia
- Phylum: Arthropoda
- Class: Insecta
- Order: Hemiptera
- Suborder: Auchenorrhyncha
- Infraorder: Fulgoromorpha
- Family: Issidae
- Genus: Conosimus
- Species: C. baenai

Binomial name
- Conosimus baenai Gnezdilov & Aguin-Pombo, 2014

= Conosimus baenai =

Species of true bug

Conosimus baenai is a species of planthopper native to the Iberian Peninsula in Spain. Its coloration ranges between light yellow and greenish-yellow. Males measure about 4.1–4.4 millimeters in length while females measure about 4.7–5.0 millimeters. The species was named after Manuel Baena, a hemipterologist.
