= Malcolm Burrows =

British zoologist (1943–2026)

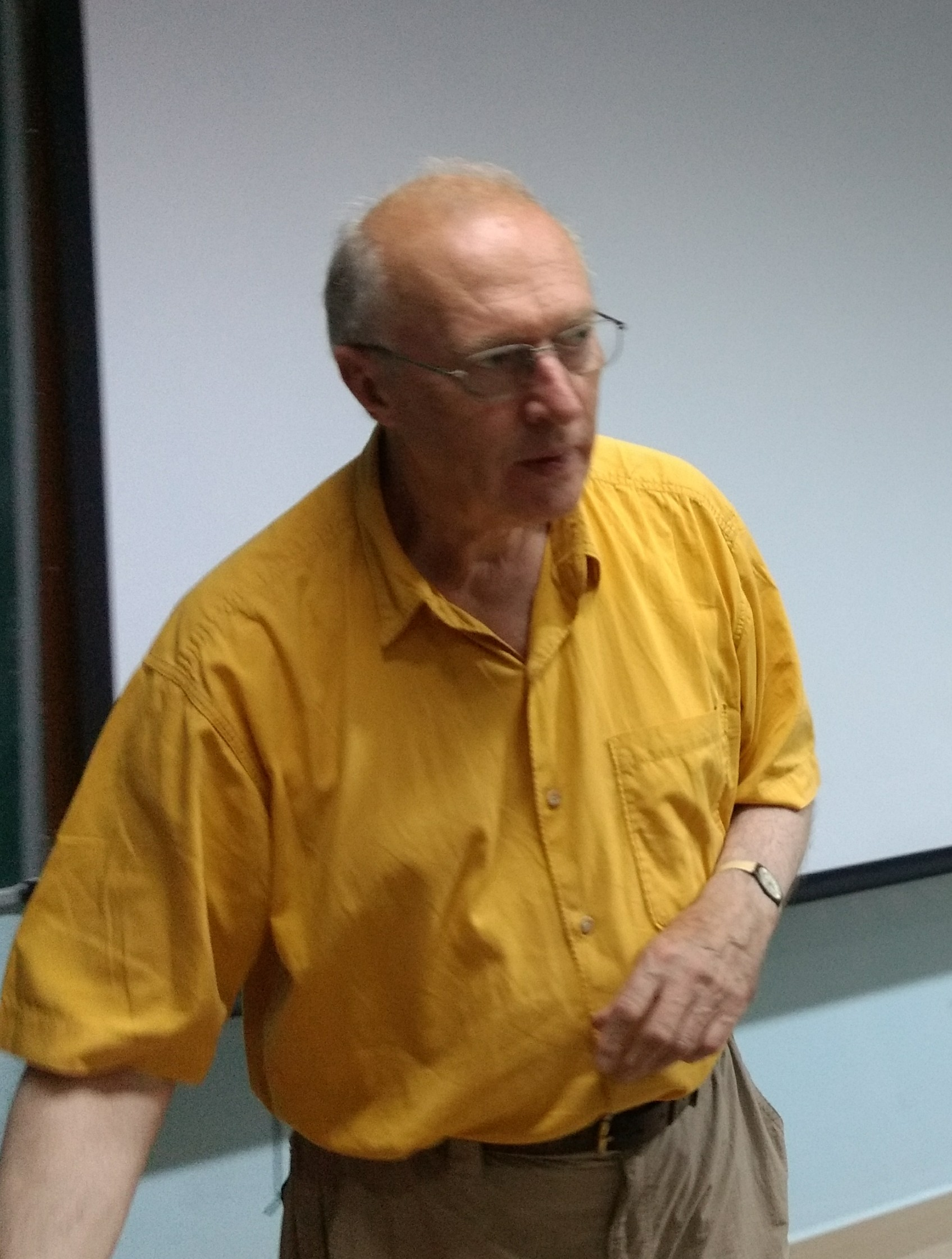
- Burrows speaking in 2017
- Born: 28 May 1943; Luton, Bedfordshire, England
- Died: 14 June 2026 (aged 83)
- Education: Jesus College, Cambridge
- Occupation: University lecturer
- Known for: The Neurobiology of an Insect Brain (1996)
- Awards: Frink Medal (2004)
- Scientific career
- Fields: Zoology

Malcolm Burrows FRS (28 May 1943 – 14 June 2026) was a British zoologist, who was a professor of zoology at the University of Cambridge. His area of research specialisation was in the neural control of animal behaviour particularly in those of small invertebrates. Some of his research examined the circuitry of neurons, muscles and the mechanics of joints involved in the rapid movements and leaps of insects.

== Life and career ==
Born in Luton, Burrows matriculated at Jesus College, Cambridge in 1961, and worked on his PhD under Adrian Horridge at the Gatty Marine Laboratory. He then worked with Melvin Cohen at the University of Oregon on the strike mechanisms of mantis shrimps. He also worked with Dennis Willows on crab mouthparts and later worked on locust locomotion at the University of Oxford and at the invitation of Torkel Weis-Fogh, moved back to Cambridge. He was an editor at the Journal of Experimental Biology. He retired as Head of the department of zoology at Cambridge after 15 years in September 2010. He was awarded the Frink Medal in 2004.

Burrows published The Neurobiology of an Insect Brain in 1996.

Burrows died on 14 June 2026, aged 83.

== Works ==
In 2013, Burrows and Gregory Sutton described the gear mechanism used in the jumping mechanism of nymphs of the bug Issus.

- "Neural control and coordination of jumping in froghopper insects", J Neurophysiology 97:320–330
- "Froghopper insects leap to new heights", Nature 42:509
