= Oronoque =

Oronoque may refer to the following:

- Oronoque, Connecticut
- Oronoque, Kansas
- Oronoque (estate), a building in Stockbridge, Massachusetts
- Oronoque River, a river in Guyana

== See also ==
- Orénoque, a ship
- Oronoqua, a genus of insect
