= Issus montenegrus =

Scientific classification
- Kingdom: Animalia
- Phylum: Arthropoda
- Class: Insecta
- Order: Hemiptera
- Suborder: Auchenorrhyncha
- Infraorder: Fulgoromorpha
- Family: Issidae
- Genus: Issus
- Species: I. montenegrus

Binomial name
- Issus montenegrus Gnezdilov, 2017
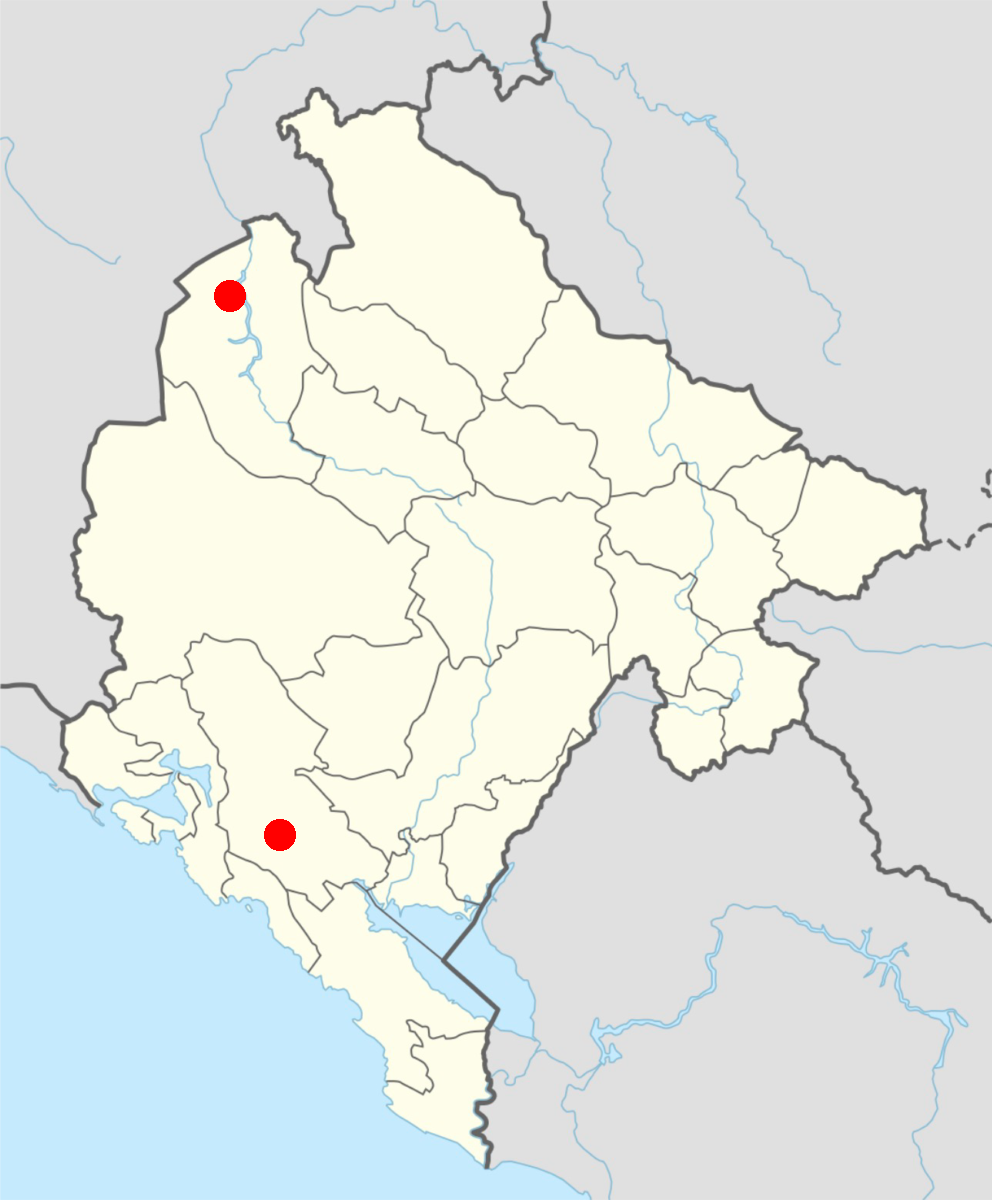

Species of planthopper

Issus montenegrus is a species of beetle in the family Issidae found in Montenegro.

== Distribution ==
This species is endemic to Montenegro, where it is found in the regions of Cetinje and Mratinje at elevations ranging from 400 to 1,200 meters above sea level.

== Sexual dimorphism ==
1 - male; 2 - female
