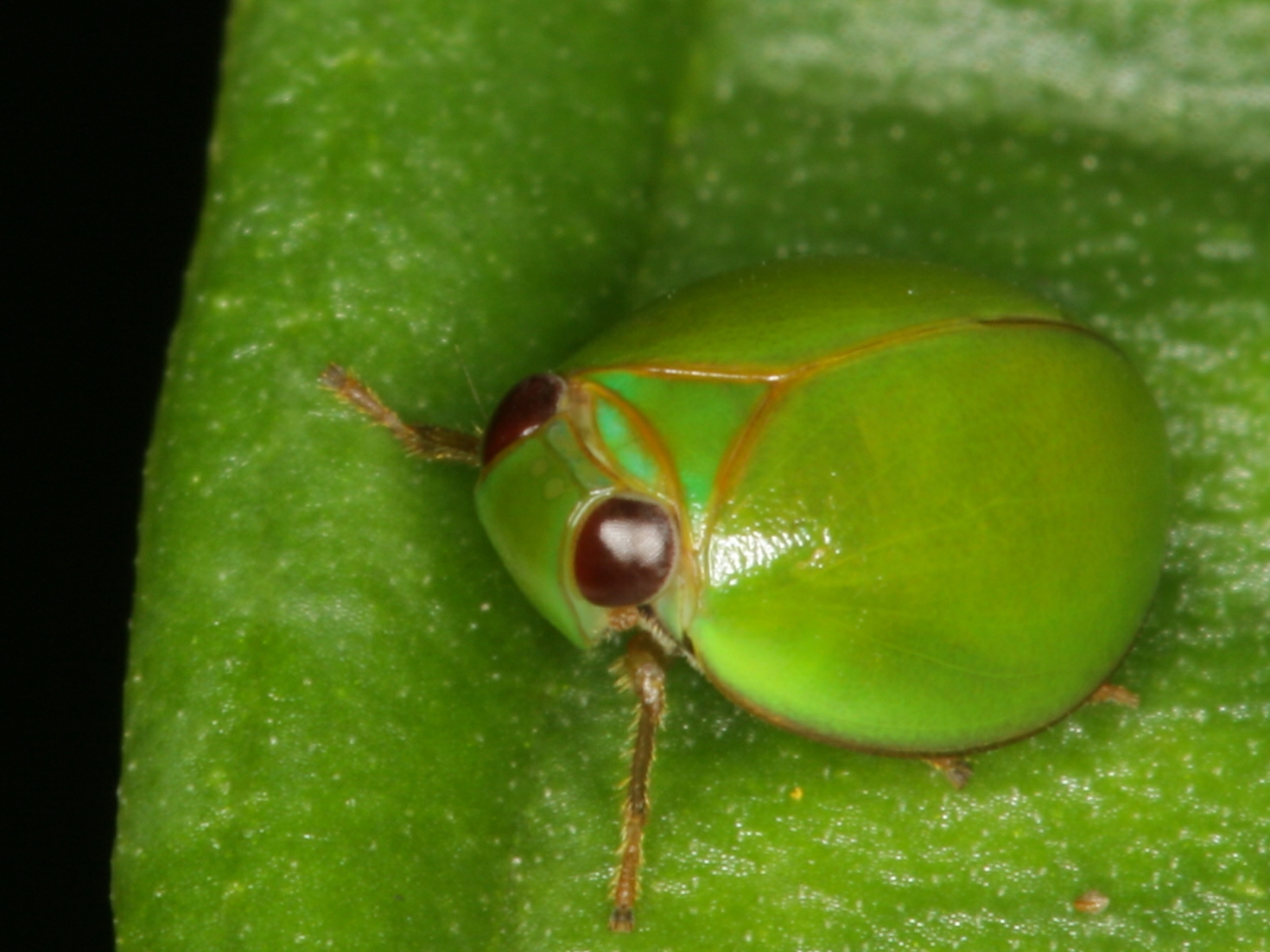
- Hemisphaerius sp., from Java

Scientific classification
- Kingdom: Animalia
- Phylum: Arthropoda
- Class: Insecta
- Order: Hemiptera
- Suborder: Auchenorrhyncha
- Infraorder: Fulgoromorpha
- Superfamily: Fulgoroidea
- Family: Issidae
- Subfamily: Hemisphaeriinae; Melichar, 1906

= Hemisphaeriinae =

Subfamily of true bugs

The Hemisphaeriinae are a subfamily of bugs in the family Issidae, based on the type genus Hemisphaerius. Species in 119 genera have been recorded in most continents, but the greatest diversity appears to be in South-East Asia.

== Tribes and Genera ==
Fulgoromorpha Lists On the Web identifies five tribes:

=== Eupilisini ===
Authority: Gnezdilov, 2020 - 4 genera across Maritime Southeast Asia and New Guinea:

- Bornepilis Gnezdilov, 2020
- Eupilis Walker, 1857 type genus
- Gabaloeca Walker, 1870
- Syrgis Stål, 1870

=== Hemisphaeriini ===
Authority: Melichar, 1906 - currently thirty genera are listed from India, China, Indochina, Malesia through to New Guinea:

subtribe Hemisphaeriina Melichar, 1906

- Ceratogergithus Gnezdilov, 2017
- Choutagus Zhang, Wang & Che, 2006
- Epyhemisphaerius Chan & Yang, 1994
- Gergithoides Schumacher, 1915
- Gergithus Stål, 1870
- Hemisphaerius Schaum, 1850 – type genus
- Maculergithus Constant & Pham, 2016
- Neogergithoides Sun, Meng & Wang, 2012
- Neohemisphaerius Chen, Zhang & Chang, 2014
- Ophthalmosphaerius Gnezdilov, 2017
- Rotundiforma Meng, Wang & Qin, 2013

subtribe Mongolianina Wang, Zhang & Bourgoin, 2016

- Bruneastrum Gnezdilov, 2015
- Clypeosmilus Gnezdilov & Soulier-Perkins, 2017
- Eusudasina Yang, 1994
- Euxaldar Fennah, 1978
- Folifemurum Che, Zhang & Wang, 2013
- Macrodaruma Fennah, 1978
- Mongoliana Distant, 1909
- Retaldar Zhao, Bourgoin & Wang, 2019

subtribe incertae sedis

- Bolbosphaerius Gnezdilov, 2013
- Euhemisphaerius Chan & Yang, 1994
- Gnezdilovius Meng, Webb & Wang, 2017
- Hemiphile Metcalf, 1952
- Hemisphaeroides Melichar, 1903
- Hysteropterissus Melichar, 1906
- Hysterosphaerius Melichar, 1906
- Ishiharanus Hori, 1969
- Neotapirissus Meng & Wang, 2016
- Paramongoliana Chen, Zhang & Chang, 2014
- Tapirissus Gnezdilov, 2014

=== Kodaianellini ===
Authorities: Wang, Zhang & Bourgoin, 2016 - 6 genera in China, Indochina and the Indian subcontinent:

- Dentatissus Chen, Zhang & Chang, 2014
- Kodaianella Fennah, 1956
- Kodaianellissus Wang, Bourgoin & Zhang, 2017
- Neokodaiana Yang, 1994
- Sivaloka Distant, 1906
- Tetricissus Wang, Bourgoin & Zhang, 2017

=== Parahiraciini ===
Authorities: Cheng & Yang, 1991 - 28 genera, widespread but especially Indochina and Malesia:

- Bolbossus† Gnezdilov & Bourgoin, 2016

subtribe Parahiraciina Cheng & Yang, 1991

- Bardunia Stål, 1863
- Brevicopius Meng, Qin & Wang, 2015
- Duriopsilla Fennah, 1956
- Duroides Melichar, 1906
- Flavina Stål, 1861
- Fortunia Distant, 1909
- Fusiissus Zhang & Chen, 2010
- Gelastyrella Yang, 1994
- Laohiracia Constant, 2021
- Macrodarumoides Che, Zhang & Wang, 2012
- Mincopius Distant, 1909
- Narinosus Gnezdilov & Wilson, 2005
- Neodurium Fennah, 1956
- Neotetricodes Zhang & Chen, 2012
- Paratetricodes Zhang & Chen, 2010
- Pinocchias Gnezdilov & Wilson, 2005
- Pseudochoutagus Che, Zhang & Wang, 2011
- Pumatiracia Constant & Pham, 2023
- Pusulissus Bourgoin & Wang, 2020
- Rhombissus Gnezdilov & Hayashi, 2016
- Tetricodes Fennah, 1956
- Tetricodissus Wang, Bourgoin & Zhang, 2015
- Thabena Stål, 1866
- Thabenula Gnezdilov, Soulier-Perkins & Bourgoin, 2011

subtribe Scantiniina Bourgoin & Wang, 2020

- Scantinius Stål, 1866

subtribe Vindilisina Bourgoin & Wang, 2020

- Nisoprincessa Gnezdilov, 2017
- Vindilis Stål, 1870

=== Sarimini ===
Authorities: Wang, Zhang & Bourgoin, 2016 - Asia and Australia:

1. Apsadaropteryx Kirkaldy, 1907
2. Chlamydopteryx Kirkaldy, 1907
3. Dactylissus Gnezdilov & Bourgoin, 2014
4. Darwallia Gnezdilov, 2010
5. Duplexissus Wang, Zhang & Bourgoin, 2019
6. Euroxenus Gnezdilov, 2009
7. Eusarima Yang, 1994
8. Eusarimissus Wang & Bourgoin, 2020
9. Keosarima Constant & Pham, 2025
10. Longieusarima Wang, Bourgoin & Zhang, 2017
11. Microsarimodes Chang & Chen, 2019
12. Neosarima Yang, 1994
13. Nikomiklukha Gnezdilov, 2010
14. Orbita Meng & Wang, 2016
15. Orinda (insect) Kirkaldy, 1907
16. Paguinella Gnezdilov, 2020
17. Papunega Gnezdilov & Bourgoin, 2015
18. Parallelissus Meng, Qin & Wang, 2020
19. Parasarima Yang, 1994
20. Pseudocoruncanius Meng, Qin & Wang, 2020
21. Sarillanus Qin & Stroiński, 2022
22. Sarima (insect) Melichar, 1903
23. Sarimissus Wang, Zhang & Bourgoin, 2019
24. Sarimites Meng, Qin & Wang, 2020
25. Sarimodes Matsumura, 1916
26. Sinesarima Yang, 1994
27. Sundorrhinus Gnezdilov, 2010
28. Tempsa (insect) Stål, 1866
29. Tempsarima Chang & Chen, 2020
30. Tetrica Stål, 1866
31. Tetrichina Chang & Chen, 2020
32. Yangissus Chen, Zhang & Chang, 2014

=== Hemisphaeriinae incertae sedis ===
Widespread - 20 genera:

- Amphiscepa Germar, 1830
- Brahmaloka Distant, 1906
- Chimetopina Gnezdilov, 2017
- Coruncanius Distant, 1916
- Devagama Distant, 1906
- Hemisobium Schmidt, 1911
- Jagannata Distant, 1906
- Katonella Schmidt, 1911
- Kivupterum Dlabola, 1985
- Kodaiana Distant, 1916
- Narayana (insect) Distant, 1906
- Orinda (insect) Kirkaldy, 1907
- Picumna Stål, 1864
- Radha Melichar, 1903
- Redarator Distant, 1916
- Samantiga Distant, 1906
- Tatva Distant, 1906
- Thabenoides Distant, 1916
