= Diceroptera =

Scientific classification
- Kingdom: Animalia
- Phylum: Arthropoda
- Class: Insecta
- Order: Hemiptera
- Suborder: Auchenorrhyncha
- Infraorder: Fulgoromorpha
- Family: Issidae
- Subfamily: Thioniinae
- Tribe: Thioniini
- Genus: Diceroptera; Gnezdilov, 2011
- Species: D. humboldti

Binomial name
- Diceroptera humboldti Gnezdilov, 2011

Genus of insects

Diceroptera is a genus of issid planthopper with one species, Diceroptera humboldti. It can be found in Venezuela.
