= Amnisa =

Scientific classification
- Kingdom: Animalia
- Phylum: Arthropoda
- Clade: Pancrustacea
- Class: Insecta
- Order: Hemiptera
- Suborder: Auchenorrhyncha
- Infraorder: Fulgoromorpha
- Family: Issidae
- Subfamily: Thioniinae
- Tribe: Thioniini
- Genus: Amnisa; Stål, 1862

Type species
- Amnisa singularis Stål, 1862

Genus of insects

Amnisa is a genus of issid planthopper in the family Issidae and are native to Brazil.

== Species ==
- Amnisa lata Schmidt, 1910
- Amnisa singularis Stål, 1862
- Amnisa verticalis Melichar, 1906
