= Waorania =

Scientific classification
- Kingdom: Animalia
- Phylum: Arthropoda
- Class: Insecta
- Order: Hemiptera
- Suborder: Auchenorrhyncha
- Infraorder: Fulgoromorpha
- Family: Issidae
- Subfamily: Thioniinae
- Tribe: Thioniini
- Subtribe: Waoraniina; Gnezdilov & Bartlett, 2018
- Genus: Waorania; Gnezdilov & Bartlett, 2018

Genus of insects

Waorania is the only genus of issid planthopper in the subtribe Waoraniina. The first two species in the genus were discovered in the forests of Ecuador.

== Species ==
- Waorania jaguarina Gnezdilov & Bartlett, 2018
- Waorania pantherina Gnezdilov & Bartlett, 2018
