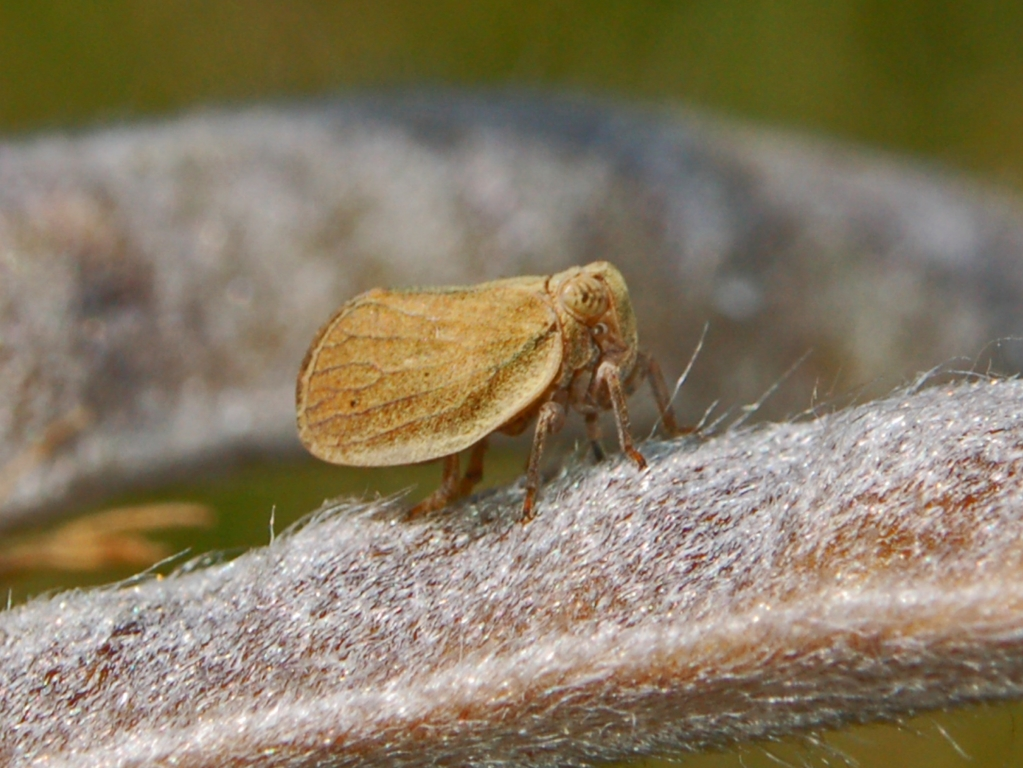
- Hysteropterum species

Scientific classification
- Domain: Eukaryota
- Kingdom: Animalia
- Phylum: Arthropoda
- Class: Insecta
- Order: Hemiptera
- Suborder: Auchenorrhyncha
- Infraorder: Fulgoromorpha
- Family: Issidae
- Subfamily: Hysteropterinae
- Tribe: Hysteropterini
- Genus: Hysteropterum; Amyot & Serville, 1843

Species
- 11, see text

= Hysteropterum =

Genus of true bugs

Hysteropterum is a genus of planthoppers described by Amyot & Serville in 1843, belonging to the family Issidae, subfamily Hysteropterinae.

== Distribution ==
Species of this genus occur in Europe and North Africa; the numerous New World species formerly assigned to this group have been reassigned to separate genera (e.g., Kathleenum).

== Description ==
The adult planthoppers reach 5–7 millimetres (0.20–0.28 in) of length, the basic coloration of their body is mostly pale brown or yellowish, with well drawn veins on wings. The females are usually bigger than the males.

== Species ==
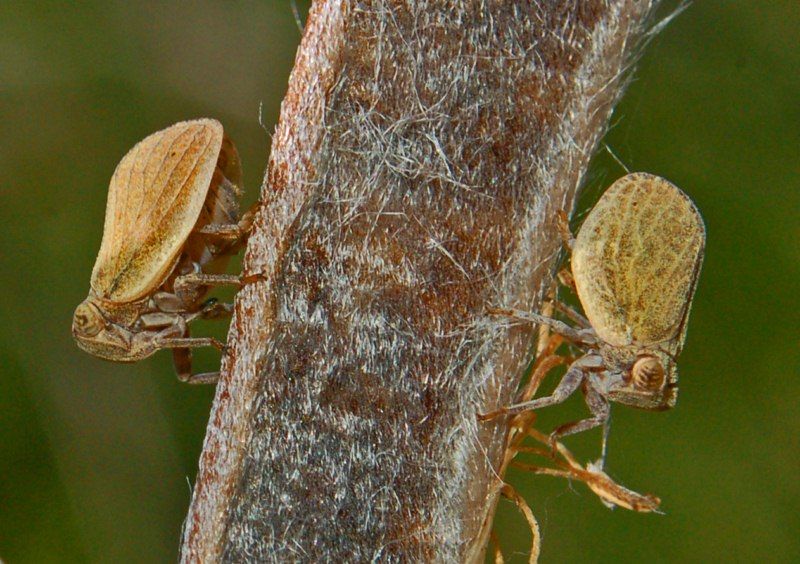
Hysteropterum species on Spanish broom (Genista juncea)

- Hysteropterum albaceticum Dlabola, 1983
- Hysteropterum algiricum (Lucas, 1849)
- Hysteropterum alicantium Dlabola, 1986
- Hysteropterum bolearicum Dlabola, 1982
- Hysteropterum curviceps Synave, 1956
- Hysteropterum dolichotum Gnezdilov & Mazzoni, 2004
- Hysteropterum melanophles Fieber, 1877
- Hysteropterum reticulatum (Herrich-Schäffer, 1835)
- Hysteropterum subangulare Rey, 1891
- Hysteropterum tkalcui (Dlabola, 1980)
- Hysteropterum vasconicum Gnezdilov, 2003
