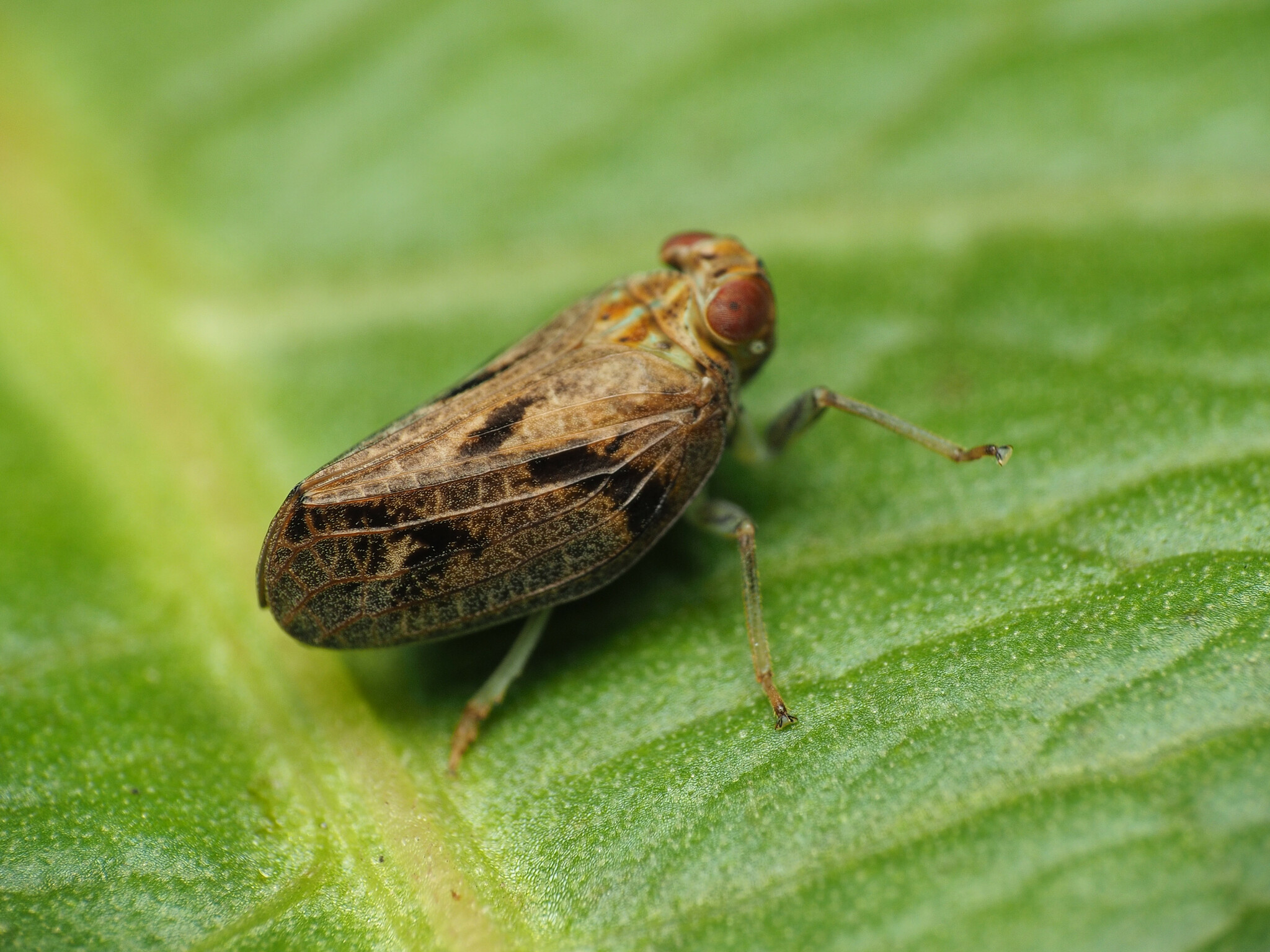
- Adult Thionia bullata

Scientific classification
- Domain: Eukaryota
- Kingdom: Animalia
- Phylum: Arthropoda
- Class: Insecta
- Order: Hemiptera
- Suborder: Auchenorrhyncha
- Infraorder: Fulgoromorpha
- Family: Issidae
- Subfamily: Thioniinae
- Tribe: Thioniini
- Subtribe: Thioniina
- Genus: Thionia; Stal, 1859

= Thionia =

Genus of true bugs

Thionia is a genus of planthoppers in the family Issidae. There are at least 60 described species in Thionia. However, several genera have been split off from Thionia reducing the number of species.

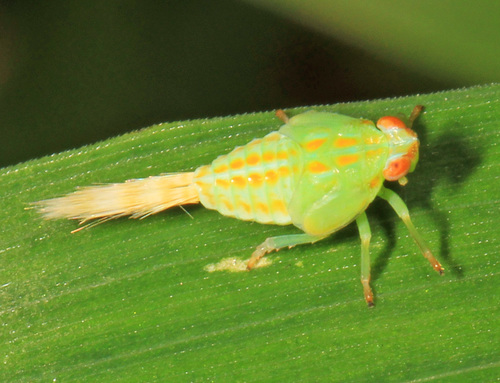
Thionia quinquata nymph

== Species ==
- Thionia bifasciatifrons Melichar, 1906^{c g}
- Thionia biforis (Germar, 1830)^{c g}
- Thionia boliviensis Schmidt, 1910^{c g}
- Thionia borinquensis Dozier, 1931^{c g}
- Thionia brasiliensis Schmidt, 1910^{c g}
- Thionia brevifrons Schmidt, 1910^{c g}
- Thionia brevior Fowler, 1904^{c g}
- Thionia bufo Fennah, 1945^{c g}
- Thionia bullata (Say, 1830)^{c g b}
- Thionia carinata Melichar, 1906^{c g}
- Thionia caviceps Fowler, 1905^{c g}
- Thionia coriacea (Fabricius, 1803)^{c g}
- Thionia crucifera Metcalf, 1938^{c g}
- Thionia dissimilis Schmidt, 1910^{c g}
- Thionia douglundbergi Stroinski & Szwedo, 2008^{c g}
- Thionia dryas Fennah, 1945^{c g}
- Thionia dubiosa Melichar, 1906^{c g}
- Thionia ecuadoriensis Schmidt, 1910^{c g}
- Thionia elliptica (Germar, 1830)^{c g b}
- Thionia fowleri Metcalf, 1938^{c g}
- Thionia fusca Melichar, 1906^{c g}
- Thionia gibba Melichar, 1906^{c g}
- Thionia gibbicollis Dozier, 1931^{c g}
- Thionia herbacea (Spinola, 1839)^{g}
- Thionia humilis Fowler, 1904^{c g}
- Thionia impressa Melichar, 1906^{c g}
- Thionia latifrons Melichar, 1906^{c g}
- Thionia longipennis (Spinola, 1839)^{c g}
- Thionia maculata Melichar, 1906^{c g}
- Thionia maculipes Stal, 1864^{c g}
- Thionia mammifera Fennah, 1945^{c g}
- Thionia mexicana Melichar, 1906^{c g}
- Thionia minor Schmidt, 1910^{c g}
- Thionia obrienae Wilson, 1987^{c g b}
- Thionia obsoleta Melichar, 1906^{c g}
- Thionia obtusa Melichar, 1906^{c g}
- Thionia ocellata Melichar, 1906^{c g}
- Thionia ohausi Schmidt, 1910^{c g}
- Thionia omani Doering, 1939^{c g}
- Thionia onerata Melichar, 1906^{c g}
- Thionia ovata Melichar, 1906^{c g}
- Thionia parana Bergroth, 1910^{c g}
- Thionia pehlkei Schmidt, 1910^{c g}
- Thionia pictifrons Fowler, 1905^{c g}
- Thionia prasina (Spinola, 1839)^{c g}
- Thionia proxima Melichar, 1906^{c g}
- Thionia quadratifrons Schmidt, 1910^{c g}
- Thionia quinquata Metcalf, 1923^{c g b}
- Thionia ramosi Caldwell & Martorell, 1951^{c g}
- Thionia rubrocostata (Spinola, 1839)^{c g}
- Thionia schmidti Schmidt, 1910^{c g}
- Thionia scutellata Fowler, 1904^{c g}
- Thionia similis Schmidt, 1910^{c g}
- Thionia sinuata Schmidt, 1910^{c g}
- Thionia soluta Fowler, 1905^{c g}
- Thionia sordida Fowler, 1904^{c g}
- Thionia stipes Fowler, 1905^{c g}
- Thionia tigrata Melichar, 1906^{c g}
- Thionia transversalis Melichar, 1906^{c g}
- Thionia truncatella Melichar, 1906^{c g}
- Thionia ustulipunctata (Uhler, 1876)^{c g}
- Thionia variata Melichar, 1906^{c g}
- Thionia variegata Stal, 1864^{c g}

Data sources: i = ITIS, c = Catalogue of Life, g = GBIF, b = Bugguide.net

== See also ==
- Aplos simplex
- Cheiloceps
