= Thioniamorpha =

Scientific classification
- Domain: Eukaryota
- Kingdom: Animalia
- Phylum: Arthropoda
- Class: Insecta
- Order: Hemiptera
- Suborder: Auchenorrhyncha
- Infraorder: Fulgoromorpha
- Family: Issidae
- Subfamily: Thioniinae
- Tribe: Thioniini
- Genus: Thioniamorpha; Metcalf, 1938
- Species: T. marmorata

Binomial name
- Thioniamorpha marmorata Metcalf, 1938

Genus of insects

Thioniamorpha is a genus of issid planthopper with one species, Thioniamorpha marmorata, found in Panama.
