= Falcidius =

Scientific classification
- Kingdom: Animalia
- Phylum: Arthropoda
- Clade: Pancrustacea
- Class: Insecta
- Order: Hemiptera
- Suborder: Auchenorrhyncha
- Infraorder: Fulgoromorpha
- Family: Issidae
- Subfamily: Hysteropterinae
- Tribe: Hysteropterini
- Genus: Falcidius; Stål, 1866

Type species
- Cercopis aptera Fabricius, 1794

Species
- 10 species, see text

Genus of planthoppers in the family Issidae

Falcidius is a genus of planthoppers in the family Issidae.

== Distribution ==
This genus includes 10 species distributed only in the Mediterranean region: Morocco, Algeria, Tunisia, Malta, Southern Italy (including Sicily), and Southern France.

== Species ==
- Falcidius apterus (Fabricius, 1794)
- Falcidius chlorizans (Rey, 1891)
- Falcidius diphtheriopsis Bergevin, 1919
- Falcidius doriae (Ferrari, 1884)
- Falcidius duffelsicus Dlabola, 1982
- Falcidius ebejeri Gnezdilov & Wilson, 2008
- Falcidius hannibal Gnezdilov & Wilson, 2008
- Falcidius limbatus (A. Costa, 1864)
- Falcidius marocanus Bergevin, 1923
- Falcidius scipionis Gnezdilov & Wilson, 2008
