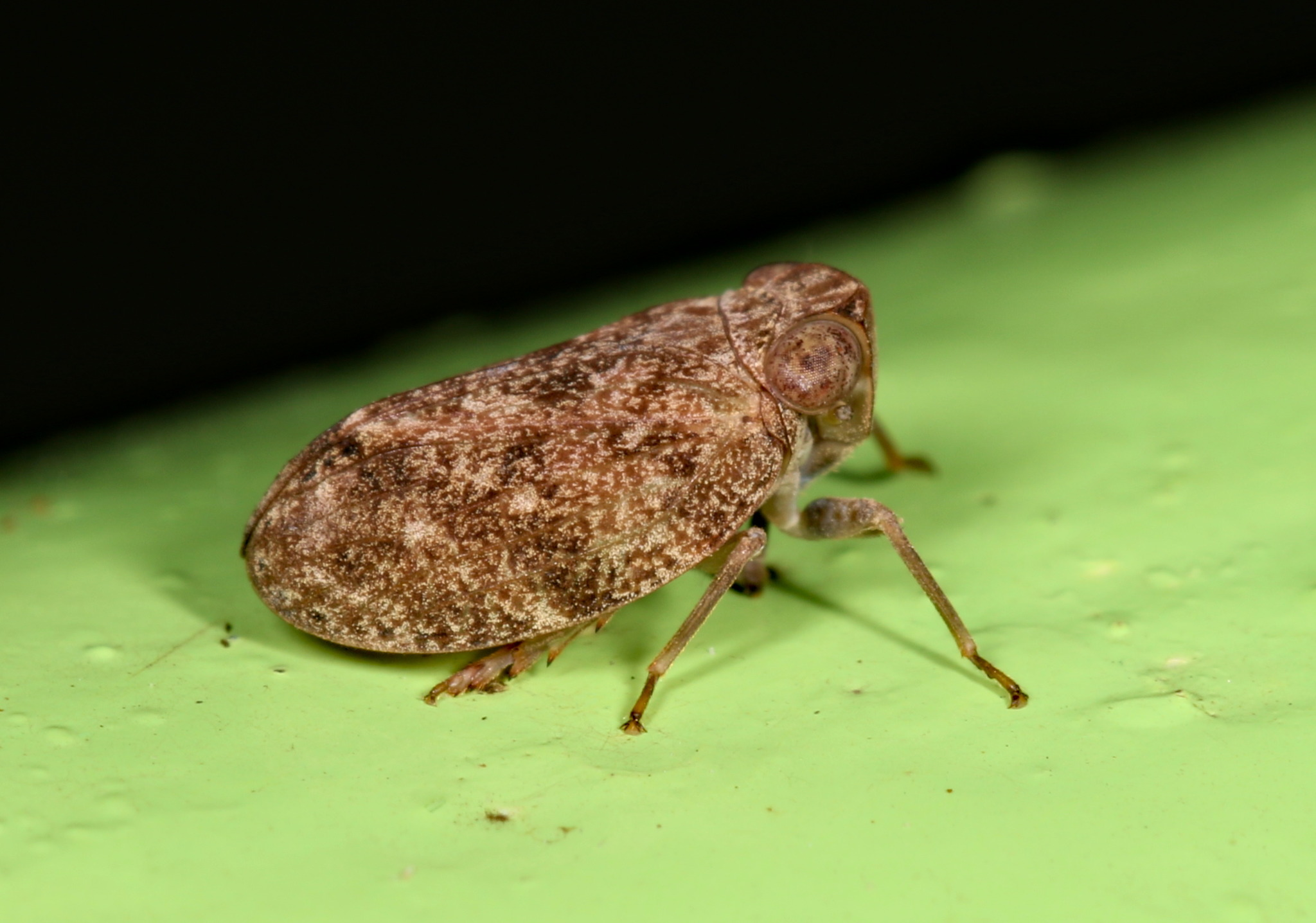
- Thabena brunnifrons, Hong Kong

Scientific classification
- Kingdom: Animalia
- Phylum: Arthropoda
- Clade: Pancrustacea
- Class: Insecta
- Order: Hemiptera
- Suborder: Auchenorrhyncha
- Infraorder: Fulgoromorpha
- Family: Issidae
- Genus: Thabena; Stål, 1866

= Thabena =

Genus of insects

Thabena is a genus of planthoppers in the family Issidae. There are about 15 described species in Thabena, found in southeast and temperate Asia. Thabena a can jump up to 15cm.

== Species ==
These 15 species belong to the genus Thabena:

- Thabena biplaga (Walker, 1851)
- Thabena brunnifrons (Bonfils, Attié & Reynaud, 2001)
- Thabena decipiens (Melichar, 1906)
- Thabena diversa (Melichar, 1906)
- Thabena fissala (Fieber, 1876)
- Thabena frontocolorata Gnezdilov, 2015
- Thabena hainanensis (Ran & Liang, 2006)
- Thabena lanpingensis Zhang & Chen, 2012
- Thabena latifrons (Melichar, 1906)
- Thabena litaoensis (Yang, 1994)
- Thabena literosa (Walker, 1857)
- Thabena ovalis (Walker, 1857)
- Thabena retracta (Walker, 1857)
- Thabena testudinaria (Stål, 1854)
- Thabena yunnanensis (Ran & Liang, 2006)
