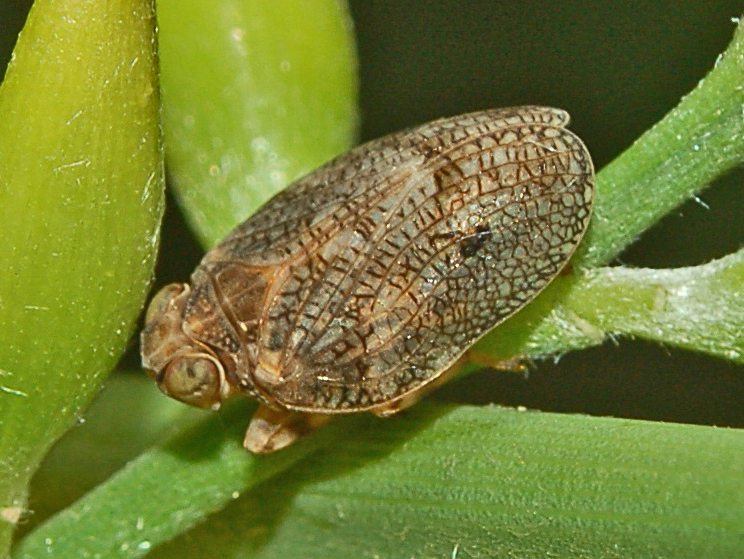
- Adult of Issus coleoptratus, dorsal view
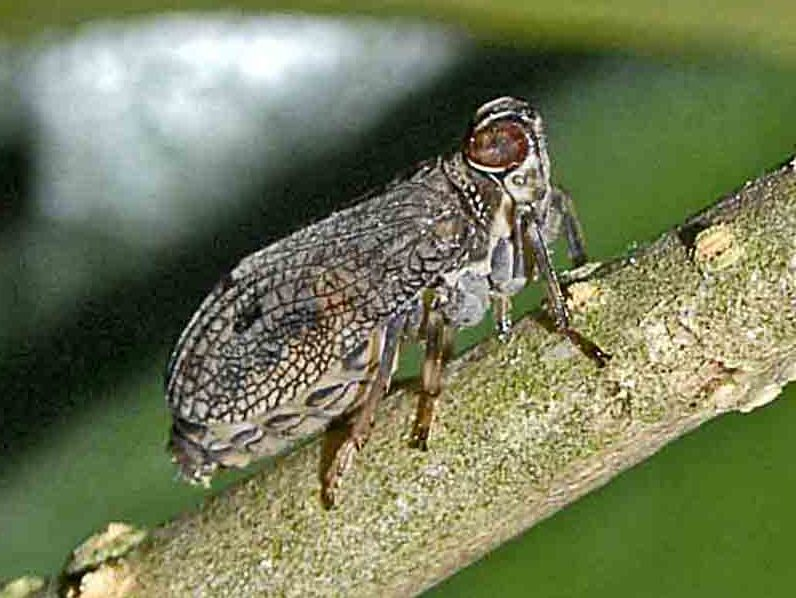
- Issus coleoptratus, lateral view

Scientific classification
- Kingdom: Animalia
- Phylum: Arthropoda
- Clade: Pancrustacea
- Class: Insecta
- Order: Hemiptera
- Suborder: Auchenorrhyncha
- Infraorder: Fulgoromorpha
- Family: Issidae
- Genus: Issus
- Species: I. coleoptratus

Binomial name
- Issus coleoptratus (Fabricius, 1781)

Synonyms
- List: Cercopis coleoptratus Fabricius, 1781; Cercopis pedestris Fabricius, 1794; Cicada gibbosa Goeze, 1778; Issus bimacula Walker, 1851; Issus coleopteratus Melichar, 1896; Issus maurus Walker, 1851; Issus quadriguttatus Walker, 1851

= Issus coleoptratus =

Species of planthopper

Issus coleoptratus is a species of planthopper belonging to the family Issidae, named by the Danish zoologist Johan Christian Fabricius in 1781.

== Distribution and habitat ==
This common species can be found in the western Palearctic realm, in the Near East, and in North Africa. These insects live on shrubbery and on foliage of various woody plants and common deciduous trees and in mixed forests (forest edges and parks).

== Description ==
Issus coleoptratus can reach a length of 5.5–7.0 millimetres (0.22–0.28 in). The coloration of these planthoppers can vary from light brown and olive to nearly black. The head, including the eyes, is narrower than the pronotum. The forehead is usually dark brown to black in the upper third, with lighter spots. In the lower area it is greenish, yellowish or brownish. The leathery wings usually show a huge number of dark brown cross-veins with a dark brown discal spot and some evidence of banding. The forewing veins of males and females differs (sexual dimorphism), as they are effaced distally in the female, while in males they are throughout prominent. This species is very similar to the much rarer Issus muscaeformis.

== Biology ==
Issus coleoptratus nymph

These insects are unable to fly, unlike most members of their family. They feed on the phloem of different trees, such as lime trees (Tilia species), oaks (Quercus species), maples (Acer species), birches (Betula species), elms (Ulmus species) and hazels (Corylus species). There is only one generation per year. Adults can be found from May to mid October, depending on location. The larvae overwinter on ivy (Hedera species), privet (Ligustrum species), juniper (Juniperus species) and Taxus species.

Like all planthoppers, the nymphs of this insect have a small, gear-like structure on the base of each of their hind legs. These gear-like structures have teeth that intermesh, keeping the legs synchronized when the insect jumps, preventing it from spiraling. This is the first planthopper species in which the function of these gear-like structures was carefully described, though their existence had been known for decades. The insects shed this gear before moulting into adults.
