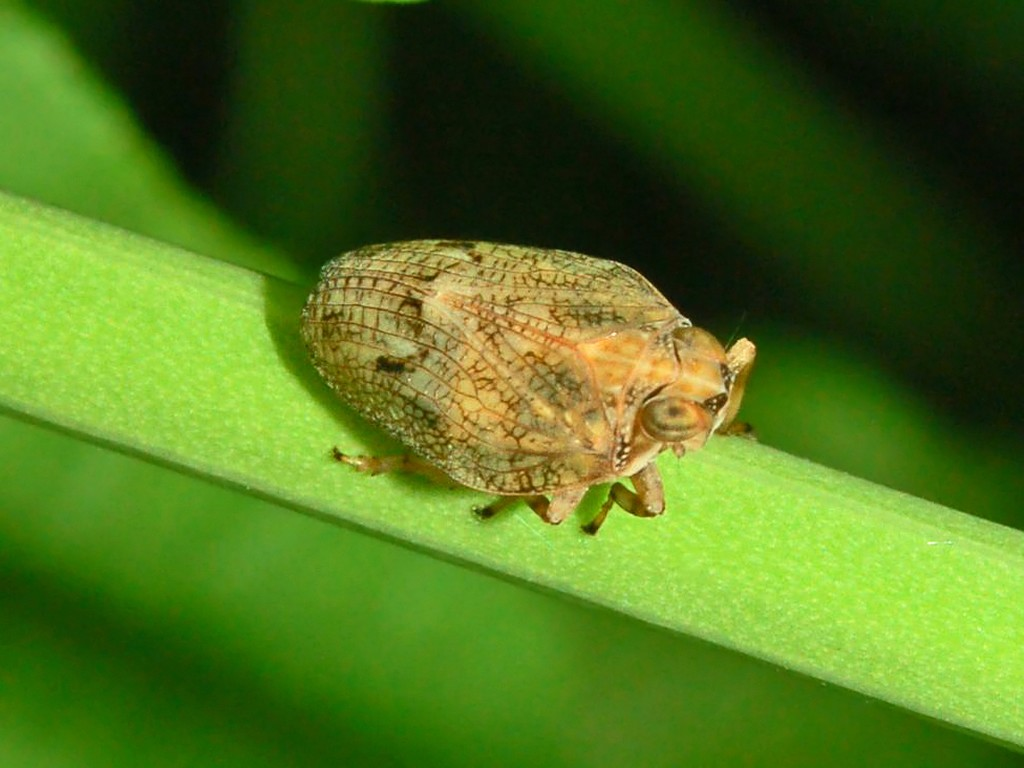
- Issus coleoptratus

Scientific classification
- Kingdom: Animalia
- Phylum: Arthropoda
- Class: Insecta
- Order: Hemiptera
- Suborder: Auchenorrhyncha
- Infraorder: Fulgoromorpha
- Superfamily: Fulgoroidea
- Family: Issidae
- Subfamily: Issinae
- Genus: Issus; Fabricius, 1803
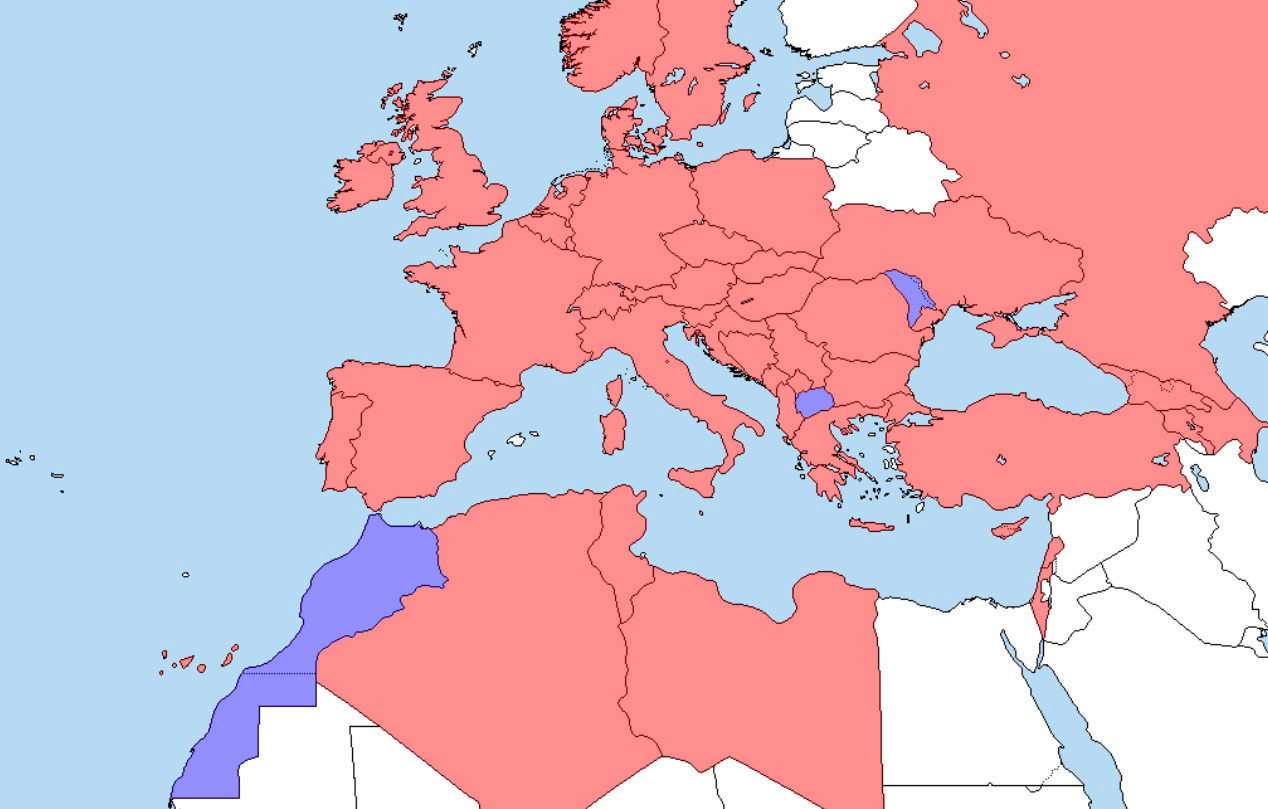

= Issus (planthopper) =

Genus of true bugs

Issus is a genus of planthoppers belonging to the family Issidae of infraorder Fulgoromorpha of suborder Auchenorrhyncha of order Hemiptera. Like most members of the order Hemiptera (popularly known as the "bug" or "true bugs" order) they live on phloem sap that they extract with their piercing, sucking mouth parts.

Planthoppers are the only animals known to possess a gear mechanism, and Issus coleoptratus is the first type of planthopper to have the mechanism formally described. The mesh sector gears do not transform velocity or torque, and they do not convey much of the power; they only synchronize the jumping motion of the hind legs, preventing yaw (rotation).

== Description ==
The genus Issus includes small insects generally flightless with a stocky, brown body and forewings with strong pronounced ribs. They feed on phloem. Species of this genus are present in most of Europe, in the Near East, and in North Africa.

== Gear mechanism ==
Planthoppers (of which there are over 12,000 known species) are the first animals found to possess a biological form of a mechanical gear, used in locomotion (crocodiles possess a heart valve with cog-like projections, but they have no cog-like function.) The existence of the gears in planthoppers had been known for decades, but zoologist Gregory Sutton and his co-authors only recently characterized their functional significance by doing high-speed photography of Issus coleoptratus at Cambridge University. The gears keep the hind legs in synchronization, allowing the bugs to jump accurately in a straight line, at an acceleration of nearly 400 g in two milliseconds. Each leg has a 400-micrometer strip of tapered teeth, pitch radius 200 micrometers, with 10 to 12 fully interlocking spur-type gear teeth, including filleted curves at the base of each tooth, which reduces wear and the risk of shearing. The gears aren't connected all the time. One is located on each of the juvenile insect's hind legs, and when it prepares to jump, the two sets of teeth lock together. As a result, the legs move in almost perfect unison for a straight jump, giving the insect more connected power as the gears rotate together to their stopping point and then unlock.

The gears are found only in the nymph forms, and are found in all planthoppers, but they are lost during the final molt to the adult stage. The juveniles repeatedly molt and grow new gears before adulthood. Entomologist Malcolm Burrows has posited that the advantage of losing the gears after the last molt is that, if the gears were to be broken on an adult insect, this would be irreparable. The legs of an adult planthopper are synchronized by a different mechanism, a series of protrusions that extend from both hind legs, and push the other leg into action.

Before the planthopper nymph's hind leg mesh gears were discovered, it was assumed that only humans made and used gears.

== List of species ==
- Issus abdulnouri Dlabola, 1987 (Israel, Lebanon and Türkiye)
- Issus afrolauri Sergel, 1986 (Algeria)
- Issus bellardi Melichar, 1906 (Cyprus. However, it may also be present in Greece)
- Issus bimaculatus Melichar, 1906 (Tenerife Island, Spain)
- Issus cagola Remane, 1985 (La Gomera and Hierro Islands, Spain)
- Issus cagracala Remane, 1985 (Gran Canaria Island, Spain)
- Issus cahipi Remane, 1985 (Hierro Island, Spain)
- Issus capala Remane, 1985 (La Palma Island, Spain)
- Issus capapi Remane, 1985 (La Palma Island, Spain)
- Issus christiani Gnezdilov, 2019
- Issus cinereus (Olivier, 1791) (France)
- Issus coleoptratus (Fabricius, 1781) (Algeria, Austria, Belgium, Bulgaria, Czech Republic, France including Corsica, Germany, Greece, Hungary, Ireland, Italy including Sardinia and Sicily, Luxembourg, Moldova, Saint Helena, The Netherlands, Poland, Romania, Slovakia, Slovenia, Spain, Switzerland and the UK. However, it can also be present in Portugal)
- Issus distinguendus Lindberg, 1954 (Lanzarote and Fuerteventura Islands)
- Issus fieberi Melichar, 1906 (Cyprus)
- Issus frontalis Fieber, 1876 (Austria, Croatia, France, Italy and Serbia)
- Issus gracalama Remane, 1985 (Gran Canaria Island, Spain)
- Issus gratehigo Remane, 1985 (Gran Canaria, Tenerife, La Gomera and Hierro Islands, Spain)
- Issus hipidus Remane, 1985 (Hierro Island, Spain)
- Issus kabylicus Dlabola, 1989 (Algeria)
- Issus lauri Ahrens, 1814 (Albania, Croatia, France (Corsica I.), Greece including Corfu and Italy including Sicily. However, it can also be present in Bosnia & Hercegovina, Montenegro, Portugal, Serbia and Spain)
- Issus montenegrus Gnezdilov, 2017 (Montenegro)
- Issus muscaeformis (Von Schrank, 1781) (Austria, Bosnia & Herzegovina, Bulgaria, Croatia, Czech Republic, Denmark, France, Germany, Greece, Hungary, Italy, Moldova, Montenegro, The Netherlands, Norway, Poland, Romania, Slovakia, Slovenia, Sweden, Switzerland, the UK and Ukraine including Crimea)
- Issus padipus Remane, 1985 (La Palma Island, Spain)
- Issus paladitus Remane, 1985 (La Palma Island, Spain)
- Issus palama Remane, 1985 (La Palma Island, Spain)
- Issus pospisili Dlabola, 1958 (Armenia, Azerbaijan, Georgia, Greece, Russia (Karachay-Cherkess Republic and Krasnodar Territory))
- Issus rarus Lindberg, 1954 (Tenerife island, Spain)
- Issus tubiflexus Gnezdilov, 2016 (Libya)
- Issus vaucheri Gnezdilov, 2016 (Spain)

== See also ==
- Biological screw joint, found in the hip joints of some weevils
