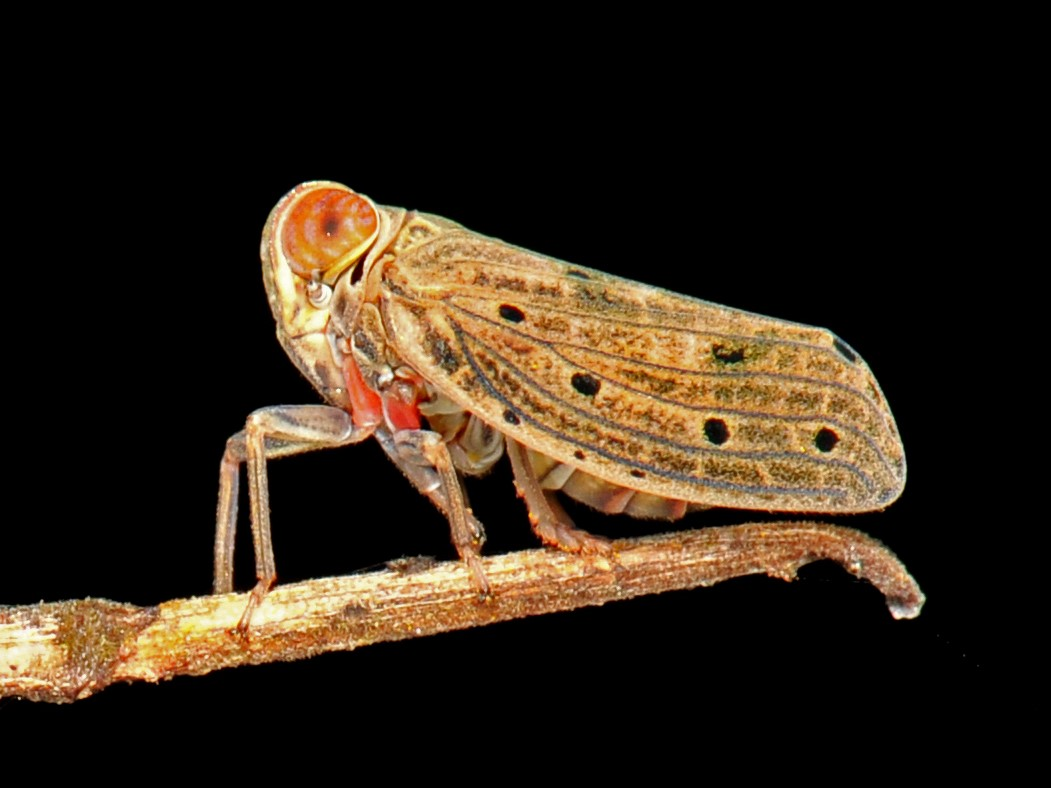
- Cheiloceps argo

Scientific classification
- Kingdom: Animalia
- Phylum: Arthropoda
- Class: Insecta
- Order: Hemiptera
- Suborder: Auchenorrhyncha
- Infraorder: Fulgoromorpha
- Family: Issidae
- Subfamily: Thioniinae
- Tribe: Thioniini
- Subtribe: Thioniina
- Genus: Cheiloceps; Uhler, 1895

= Cheiloceps =

Genus of insects

Cheiloceps is a genus of planthoppers in the family Issidae. Cheiloceps was originally erected as a genus by Uhler in 1895, later downgraded to a subgenus of Thionia by Fennah in 1955; and restored to genus status by Gnezdilov in 2018.

== Extant species ==
- Cheiloceps anguillanus (Fennah, 1965)
- Cheiloceps argo (Fennah, 1949)
- Cheiloceps borinqueta (Caldwell & Martorell, 1951)
- Cheiloceps clusiae (Fennah, 1955)
- Cheiloceps laodice (Fennah, 1955)
- Cheiloceps medusa (Fennah, 1955)
- Cheiloceps musca Uhler, 1895
- Cheiloceps puertoricensis (Caldwell & Martorell, 1951)

== Extinct species ==
- †Cheiloceps arachnophila Dietrich, Williams & Heads, 2023
- †Cheiloceps douglundbergi (Stroiński & Szwedo, 2008)
- †heiloceps magnifrons Gnezdilov, Sun & Perkovsky, 2023

== See also ==
- Thionia
