= Charles Ellington =

British zoologist (1952–2019)

Charles Ellington FRS
- Born: Charles Porter Ellington; 31 December 1952
- Died: 30 July 2019 (aged 66)
- Education: Duke University (BA); Downing College, Cambridge (MA, PhD)
- Known for: Vortex theory of insect flight
- Awards: FRS (1998)
- Scientific career
- Fields: Kinematics; Aerodynamics; Entomology; Zoology
- Workplaces: University of Cambridge
- Thesis: The aerodynamics of hovering animal flight (1982)
- Doctoral advisor: Torkel Weis-Fogh
- Website: zoo.cam.ac.uk/directory/charlie-ellington

Charles Porter Ellington (31 December 1952 – 30 July 2019) was a British zoologist, emeritus Fellow of Downing College, Cambridge, and professor emeritus at University of Cambridge.

== Education ==
Ellington was educated at Duke University where he received a Bachelor of Arts degree in 1973. He moved to Britain to study at Downing College, Cambridge, where he was awarded a Master of Arts degree in 1979 and a Doctor of Philosophy degree in 1982.

== Research ==
Ellington did research on animal mechanics.

== Awards and honours ==
Ellington was elected a Fellow of the Royal Society in 1998. His nomination reads

Charles Ellington is responsible for much of our understanding of insect flight. His early analysis of the kinematics and aerodynamics of hovering showed that the flight of most insects cannot be explained by conventional (quasi-steady) aerodynamics. This made use of an entirely new theoretical framework, a vortex theory of insect flight. Next, he combined aerodynamic analysis with physiological measurements to show that in flight, insect wing muscles work with remarkably low efficiencies. To do this, he had to solve the formidable technical problem of measuring the oxygen consumption of a single bumblebee, in free flight over a range of speeds. Most recently, he has visualised the flow of air around the wings of moths and of a greatly enlarged model that mimics insect wing motion. This has led to the unexpected discovery of a spanwise stabilising flow, explaining the unsteady effect that makes insect flight possible. His achievements have been made possible by an exceptional combination of theoretical insight and technical ingenuity.
