= Thioniella =

Scientific classification
- Kingdom: Animalia
- Phylum: Arthropoda
- Class: Insecta
- Order: Hemiptera
- Suborder: Auchenorrhyncha
- Infraorder: Fulgoromorpha
- Family: Issidae
- Subfamily: Thioniinae
- Tribe: Thioniini
- Genus: Thioniella; Metcalf, 1938
- Species: T. rugosa

Binomial name
- Thioniella rugosa Metcalf, 1938

Genus of insects

Thioniella is a genus of issid planthopper with one species, Thioniella rugosa, found in Panama.
