= Rebecca Kilner =

British evolutionary biologist

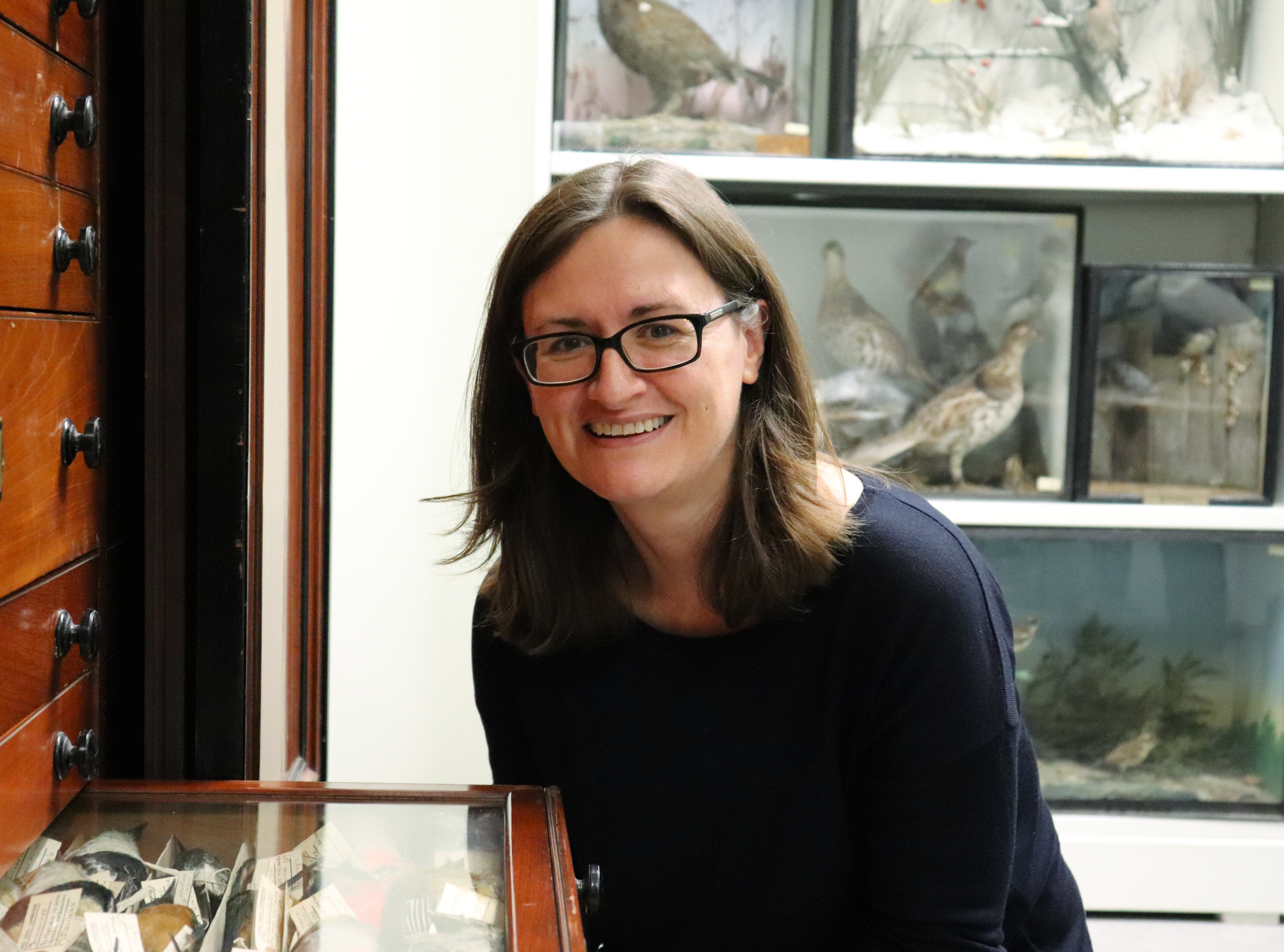
- in the University Museum of Zoology bird store
- Born: 10 August 1971 (age 55)
- Education: University of Oxford (BA) University of Cambridge (PhD)
- Scientific career
- Workplaces: University of Cambridge, Cambridge University Museum of Zoology

Rebecca Mary Kilner FRS FRES (born 10 August 1971) is a British evolutionary biologist who is 1866 Professor of Zoology at the University of Cambridge.

== Education and career ==
Kilner studied a BA in Zoology at the University of Oxford in 1992, and received a PhD in evolutionary biology at the University of Cambridge in 1996. She worked as a Junior Research Fellow at Magdalene College, Cambridge, and in 1998 was a Royal Society Dorothy Hodgkin Fellow; she was appointed Lecturer at the University of Cambridge in 2005 and a Reader in 2009.

In 2013, Kilner was appointed professor of evolutionary biology at the University of Cambridge, and in 2019, Kilner was made a Director of the Cambridge University Museum of Zoology. In 2023, Rebecca Kilner was appointed 1866 Professor of Zoology and Head of the Department of Zoology at Cambridge.

== Research ==
Kilner's research looks at how social evolution can generate biodiversity and much of her work looks at burying beetles (Silphidae) and birds.

Her earlier research looked at birds that are brood parasites, which take advantage of other species' nests and parental care. In particular, she found that cuckoos are able to produce eggs that mimic those of their host bird species. Kilner found that cowbirds, which are also brood parasites, do not try to outcompete the host chicks that they hatch next to (as with cuckoos) and instead cowbirds do better when the host chicks remain.

Parental care is common in burying beetles. Kilner's work on burying beetles has shown that beetle parents can produce a slime mixture that can influence bacteria communities on the meat they provide for their larval offspring; the bacteria aid digestion in the beetle stomach and prevent decomposition of the meat, so that beetle larvae grow larger and healthier. She also examined what happens when parents are prevented from caring for larvae over 30 successive generations. She found that the beetle larvae evolved larger jaws to help them feed from carcasses better without help. She also found that motherless beetle larvae were less competitive with each other and had higher survival rates than when mothered larvae had to cope alone.

Her research with burying beetles has also shown that they can form symbiotic relationships with mites. Smaller beetles which lose out in fights with larger beetles can benefit from the phoretic mite Poecilochirus carabi, which helps them to warm up and enables them to win contests with other beetles for a carcass food source.

In 2023 Kilner was interviewed by Jim Al-Khalili on the BBC's Life Scientific radio programme, talking about the relationship between social behaviours and evolution, including burying beetles.

== Awards ==
- In 2010, Kilner was awarded the Zoological Society of London's Scientific Medal for her "outstanding contributions to behavioural ecology and the analysis of evolutionary processes".
- In 2015, Kilner was awarded the Royal Society Wolfson Research Merit Award for her research: How does social evolution generate biodiversity?
- In 2021, she was made a Fellow of the Royal Society for her "discoveries in how social behaviour drives evolutionary change".
