= Professor of Zoology (Cambridge) =

The Professorship of Zoology is a professorship at the University of Cambridge. Founded in 1866 it was originally the 'Professorship of Zoology and Comparative Anatomy', but was renamed in 1934. The title has also been used for single-tenure professorships.

== Professors of Zoology (1866) ==
- Alfred Newton (1866)
- Adam Sedgwick (1907)
- John Stanley Gardiner (1909)
- James Gray (1937)
- Carl Frederick Abel Pantin (1959)
- Torkel Weis-Fogh (1966-1975)
- Gabriel Horn (1978)
- Malcolm Burrows (1996)
- Michael Akam (2010)
- Rebecca Kilner (2023)

== Professors of Zoology (single-tenure creations) ==
- Michael Akam (1997–2010)
- Paul Brakefield (2010–)

== See also ==
- List of professorships at the University of Cambridge
