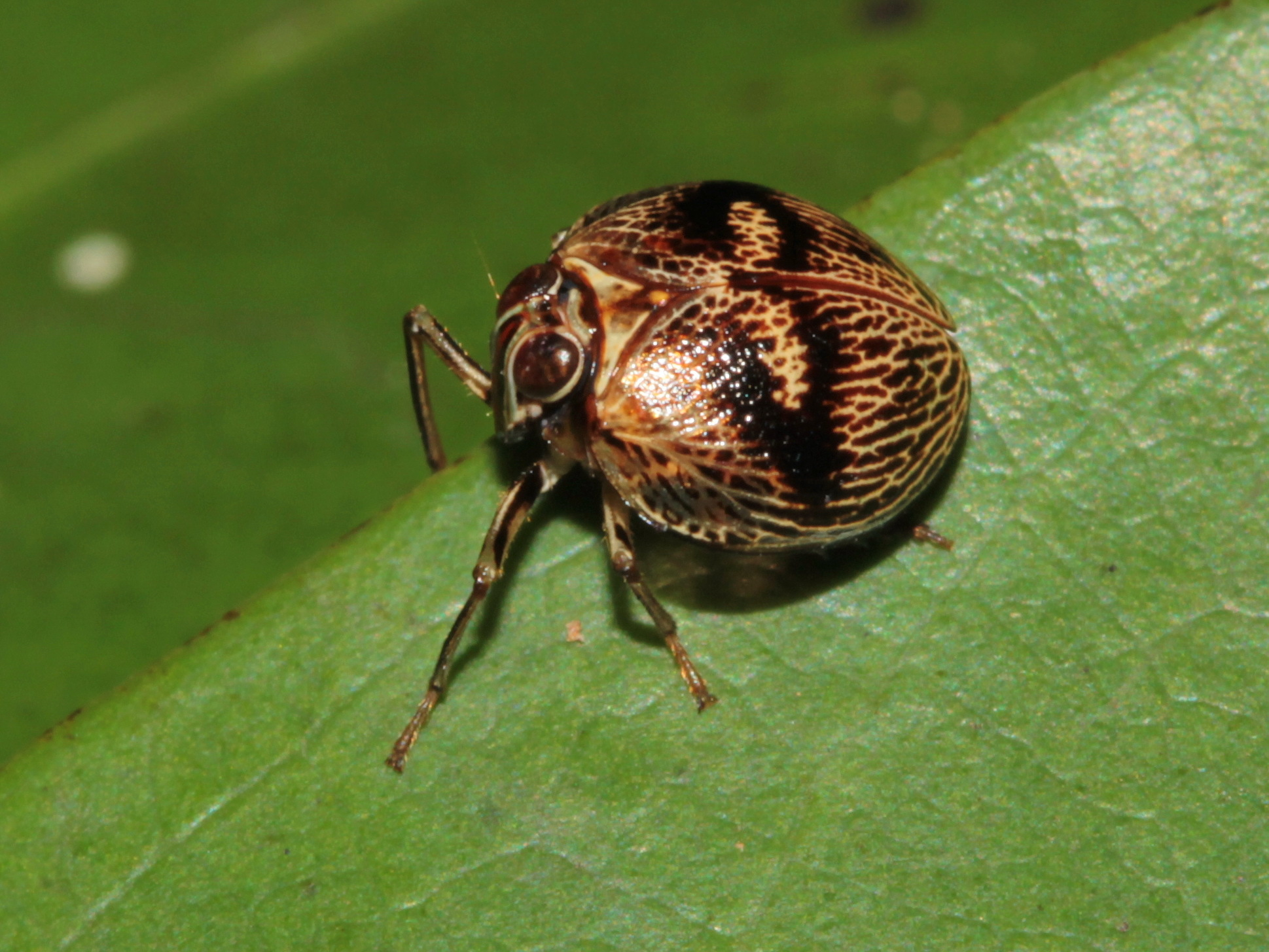
- Gergithus dayi

Scientific classification
- Kingdom: Animalia
- Phylum: Arthropoda
- Class: Insecta
- Order: Hemiptera
- Suborder: Auchenorrhyncha
- Infraorder: Fulgoromorpha
- Family: Issidae
- Tribe: Hemisphaeriini
- Genus: Gergithus; Stål, 1870

Type species
- Hemisphaerius schaumi Stål, 1855

= Gergithus =

Genus of true bugs

Gergithus is a genus of tropical Asian planthoppers in the family Issidae, erected by Carl Stål in 1870. Like all planthoppers, adults feed on plant sap and are capable of escaping by leaping. The genus like other members in the tribe appears somewhat rounded and beetle-like, in some cases, with a mimetic resemblance to ladybird beetles. Species are mostly distributed in the Indomalayan Realm.

== Description ==
The genus is closely related to Hemisphaerius but differs in having longer frons (forehead) and legs. The frons lacks a median keel (carina) or tubercles on the frons, pronotum or mesonotum. The rounded tegmen which resembles the elytra of beetles are often patterned. Although some species show variations in pattern, many species can be recognized on the basis of the patterns.

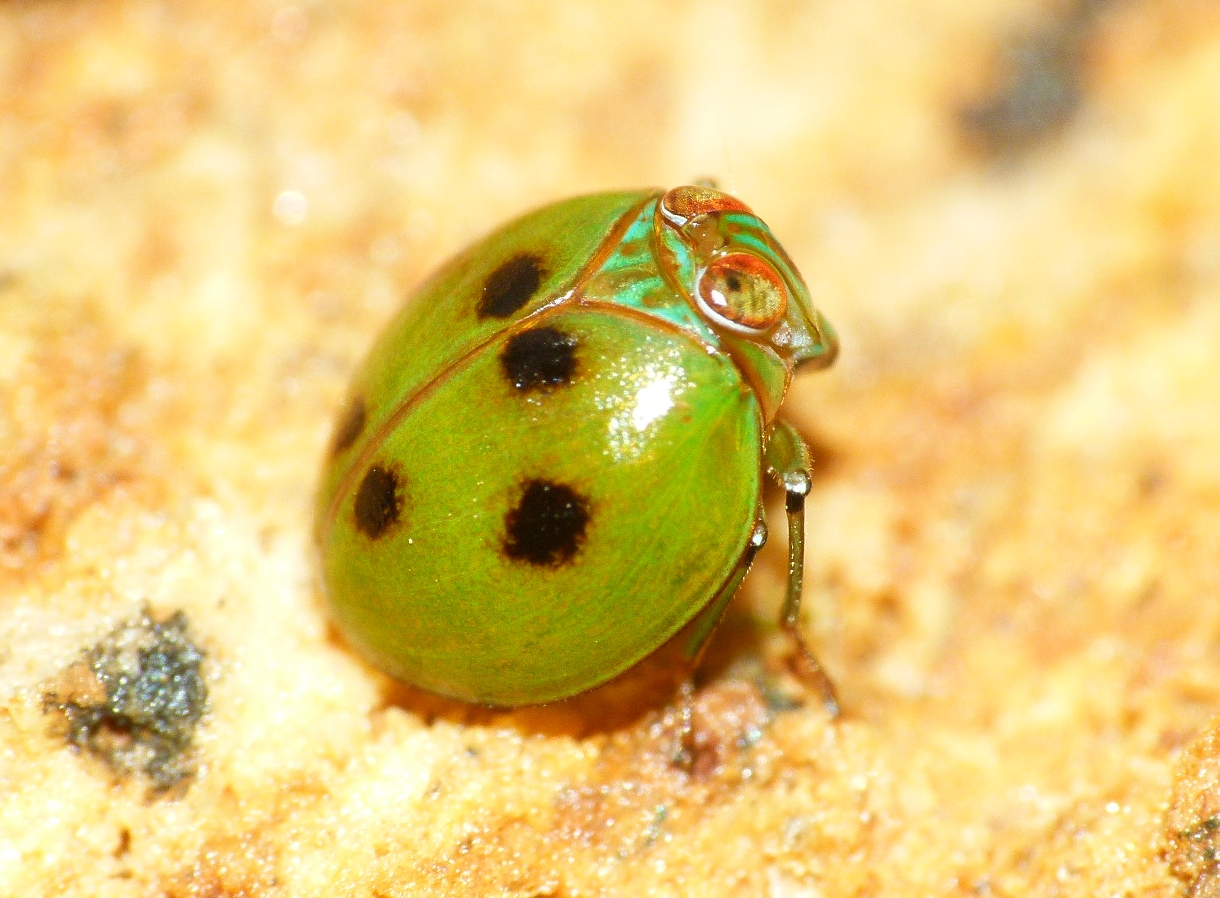
An undescribed Gergithus species from the Western Ghats

== Species ==
Fulgoromorpha Lists On the Web includes:

1. Gergithus bimaculatus Zhang & Che, 2009
2. Gergithus bipustulatus (Walker, 1858)
3. Gergithus complicatus Distant, 1916
4. Gergithus conspicularis Distant, 1916
5. Gergithus cribratus Melichar, 1906
6. Gergithus dayi Constant, 2021
7. Gergithus dubius (Butler, 1875)
8. Gergithus elongatus (Distant, 1906)
9. Gergithus erebus Distant, 1916
10. Gergithus flaviguttatus (Hori, 1969)
11. Gergithus flavimacula (Walker, 1851)
12. Gergithus floreni Constant, 2021
13. Gergithus frontilongus Meng, Webb & Wang, 2017
14. Gergithus gravidus (Melichar, 1906)
15. Gergithus herbaceus (Kirby, 1891)
16. Gergithus horishanus (Matsumura, 1916)
17. Gergithus ignotus Melichar, 1906
18. Gergithus lineolatus Melichar, 1906
19. Gergithus niger (Walker, 1857)
20. Gergithus nilgiriensis (Distant, 1906)
21. Gergithus nonomaculatus (Meng & Wang, 2012)
22. Gergithus okinawanus (Matsumura, 1936)
23. Gergithus parallelus (Che, Zhang & Wang, 2007)
24. Gergithus pigrans Melichar, 1906
25. Gergithus proteus Distant, 1916
26. Gergithus reticulatus (Distant, 1906)
27. Gergithus satsumensis Matsumura, 1916
28. Gergithus schaumi (Stål, 1855) - type species
29. Gergithus secundus (Melichar, 1903)
30. Gergithus signatifrons Melichar, 1906
31. Gergithus taiwanensis (Hori, 1969)
32. Gergithus tristriatus (Meng & Wang, 2012)
33. Gergithus venosus (Distant, 1906)
34. Gergithus versicolor Distant, 1916
35. Gergithus vidulus Melichar, 1906
36. Gergithus yunnanensis Che, Zhang & Wang, 2007
