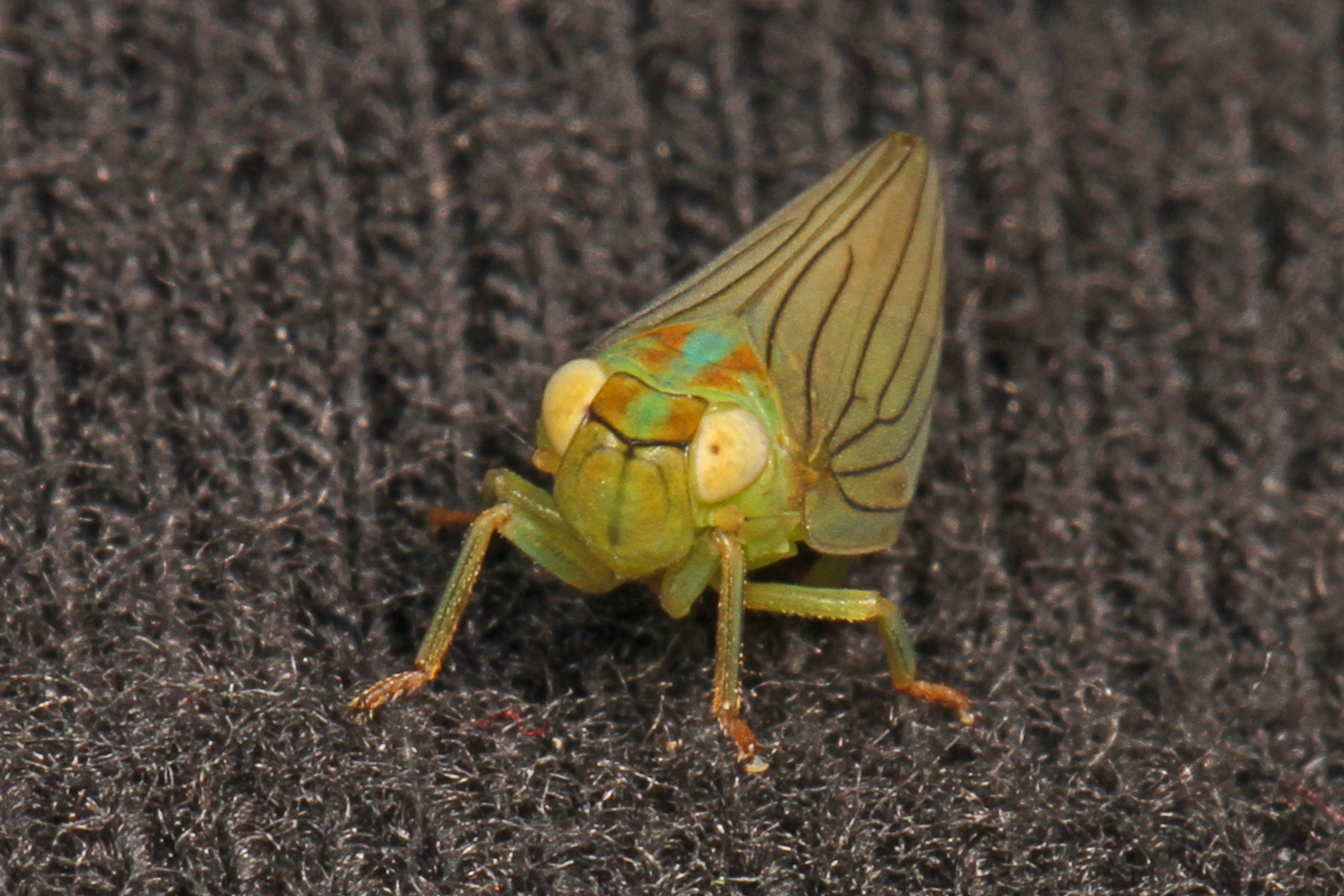

Scientific classification
- Domain: Eukaryota
- Kingdom: Animalia
- Phylum: Arthropoda
- Class: Insecta
- Order: Hemiptera
- Suborder: Auchenorrhyncha
- Infraorder: Fulgoromorpha
- Family: Issidae
- Subfamily: Thioniinae
- Tribe: Thioniini
- Subtribe: Thioniina
- Genus: Aplos; Gnezdilov, 2018
- Species: A. simplex

Binomial name
- Aplos simplex (Germar, 1830)

Synonyms
- Thionia simplex (Germar, 1830)

= Aplos =

Genus of plantopper

Aplos is a genus of issid planthopper with only one species, Aplos simplex. It can be found in most of the Eastern United States and is now found as an invasive species in Northern Italy and Austria. Aplos simplex was formerly listed under the genus Thionia.

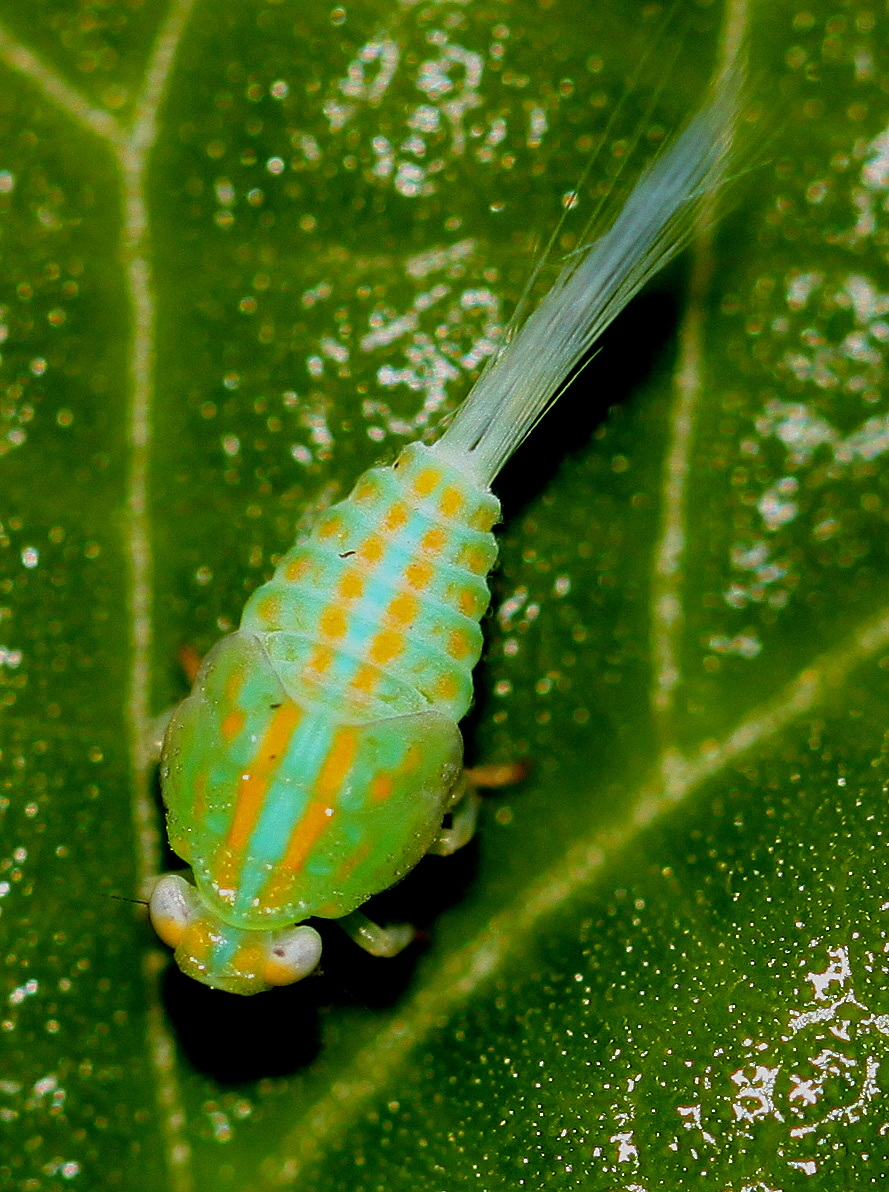
nymph with iridescent wax tail

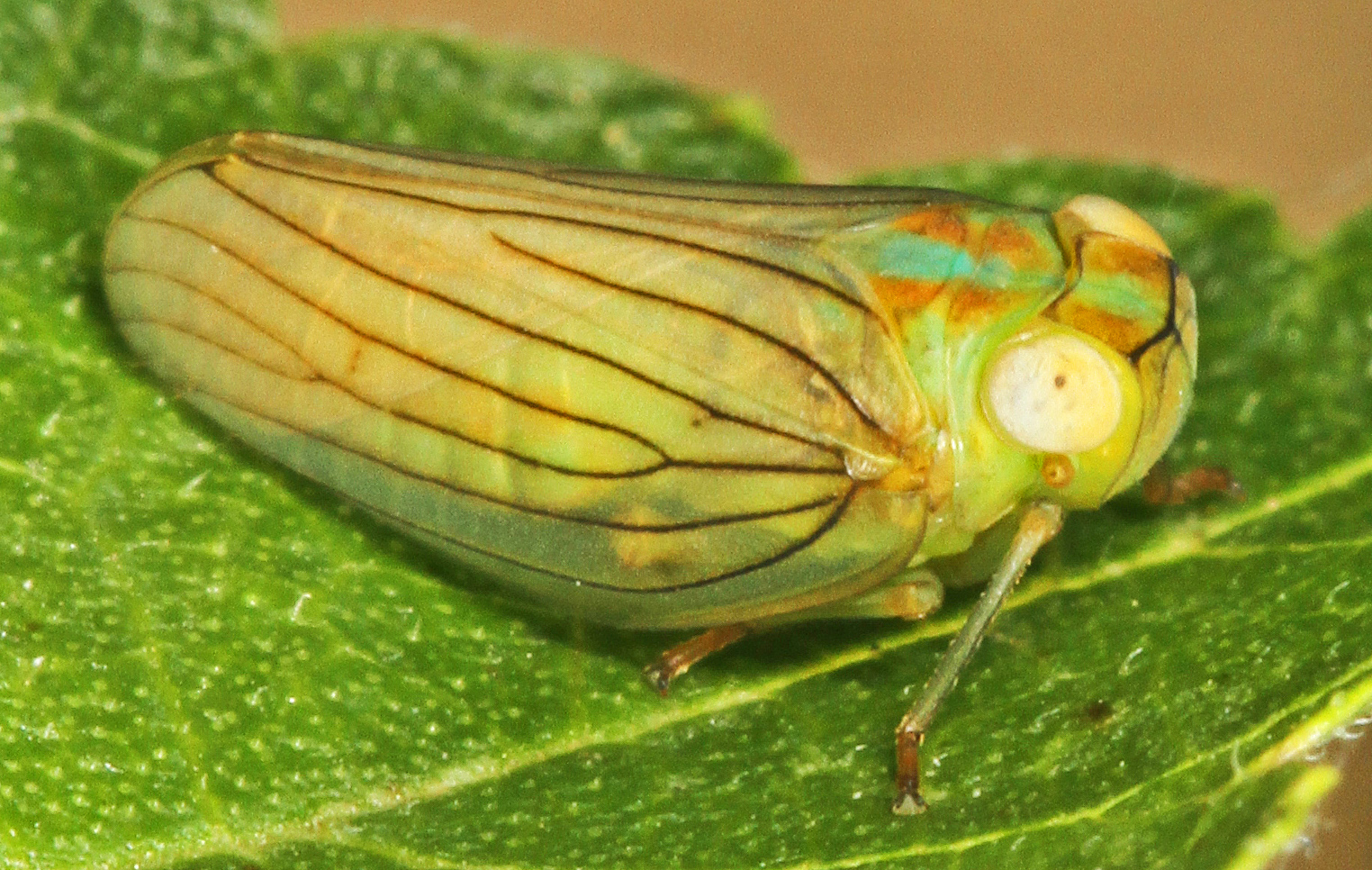
Adult
