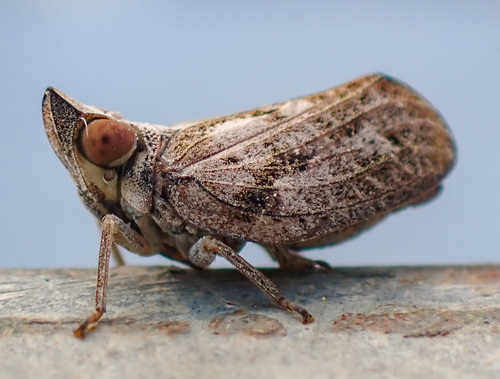
- Fowlerium acutum

Scientific classification
- Kingdom: Animalia
- Phylum: Arthropoda
- Class: Insecta
- Order: Hemiptera
- Suborder: Auchenorrhyncha
- Infraorder: Fulgoromorpha
- Family: Issidae
- Subfamily: Thioniinae
- Tribe: Thioniini
- Subtribe: Thioniina
- Genus: Fowlerium; Gnezdilov, 2018

Type species
- Thionia naso Fowler, 1904

= Fowlerium =

Genus of planthoppers

Fowlerium is a genus of planthoppers in the family Issidae. They are native to the Southwestern United States and Mexico.

== Species ==
- Fowlerium acutum (Doering, 1941)
- Fowlerium naso (Fowler, 1904)
- Fowlerium productum (Van Duzee, 1908)
