= Proteinissus =

Scientific classification
- Domain: Eukaryota
- Kingdom: Animalia
- Phylum: Arthropoda
- Class: Insecta
- Order: Hemiptera
- Suborder: Auchenorrhyncha
- Infraorder: Fulgoromorpha
- Family: Issidae
- Subfamily: Thioniinae
- Tribe: Thioniini
- Genus: Proteinissus; Fowler, 1904

Type species
- Proteinissus bilimeki Fowler, 1904

Genus of insects

Proteinissus is a genus of planthopper in the family Issidae, found in Mexico.

== Species ==
- Proteinissus bilimeki Fowler, 1904
- Proteinissus isolatus (Caldwell, 1945)
- Proteinissus pentagonatus (Caldwell, 1945)
- Proteinissus punctatus (Caldwell, 1945)
- Proteinissus reticulatus (Caldwell, 1945)
- Proteinissus viridus (Caldwell, 1945)
