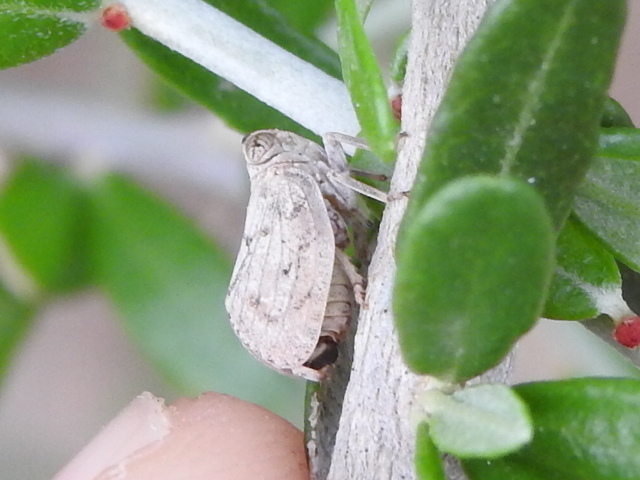

Scientific classification
- Domain: Eukaryota
- Kingdom: Animalia
- Phylum: Arthropoda
- Class: Insecta
- Order: Hemiptera
- Suborder: Auchenorrhyncha
- Infraorder: Fulgoromorpha
- Superfamily: Fulgoroidea
- Family: Issidae
- Genus: Abolloptera; Gnezdilov & O'Brien, 2006
- Species: A. bistriata

Binomial name
- Abolloptera bistriata (Caldwell, 1945)

Synonyms
- Hysteropterum bistriatum Caldwell, 1945

= Abolloptera =

Genus of plantopper

Abolloptera is a genus of planthoppers with only one species, Abolloptera bistriata. It is found in Texas and north-eastern Mexico.
