= Heremon (planthopper) =

Scientific classification
- Domain: Eukaryota
- Kingdom: Animalia
- Phylum: Arthropoda
- Class: Insecta
- Order: Hemiptera
- Suborder: Auchenorrhyncha
- Infraorder: Fulgoromorpha
- Family: Issidae
- Subfamily: Thioniinae
- Tribe: Thioniini
- Genus: Heremon; Kirkaldy, 1903

Genus of insects

Heremon is a genus of planthoppers in the family Issidae, native to the neotropics.

== Species ==
- Heremon cribatum (Melichar, 1906)
- Heremon gibbifrons Melichar, 1906
- Heremon infixum (Walker, 1858)
- Heremon instabile (Stål, 1862)
- Heremon notatum (Melichar, 1906)
