= Dracela =

Scientific classification
- Kingdom: Animalia
- Phylum: Arthropoda
- Class: Insecta
- Order: Hemiptera
- Suborder: Auchenorrhyncha
- Infraorder: Fulgoromorpha
- Family: Issidae
- Tribe: Thioniini
- Genus: Dracela; Signoret, 1861

Type species
- Dracela annulipes Signoret, 1861

Genus of insects

Dracela is a genus of issid planthopper in the family Issidae and can be found in northern South America and southern Central America.

== Species ==
- Dracela acuta (Metcalf, 1938)
- Dracela annulipes Signoret, 1861
- Dracela pehlkei Schmidt, 1923
