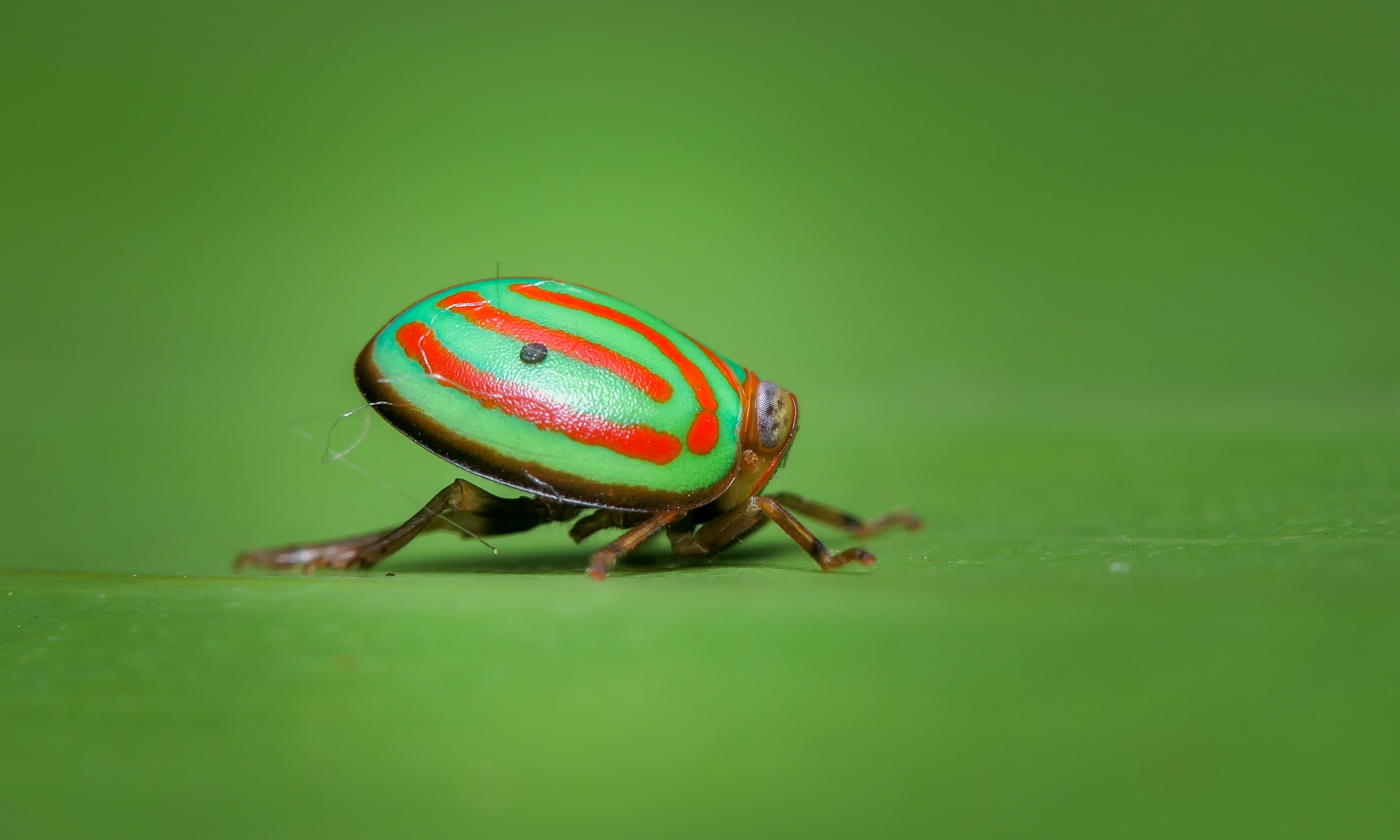
- Hemisphaerius interclusus from Cát Tiên National Park

Scientific classification
- Kingdom: Animalia
- Phylum: Arthropoda
- Clade: Pancrustacea
- Class: Insecta
- Order: Hemiptera
- Suborder: Auchenorrhyncha
- Infraorder: Fulgoromorpha
- Family: Issidae
- Subfamily: Hemisphaeriinae
- Tribe: Hemisphaeriini
- Genus: Hemisphaerius; Schaum, 1850

Synonyms
- Haemisphaerius Stål, 1861

= Hemisphaerius =

Genus of true bugs

Hemisphaerius is a genus of bugs in the family Issidae and tribe Hemisphaeriini. Species resemble the closely related Gergithus: but are differentiated in this genus by the size of the frons and shorter legs.

== Species ==
Fulgoromorpha Lists On the Web includes:

1. Hemisphaerius affinis Melichar, 1914
2. Hemisphaerius alutaceus Melichar, 1906
3. Hemisphaerius astridae Lallemand, 1931
4. Hemisphaerius bacculinus Butler, 1875
5. Hemisphaerius biarcuatus Melichar, 1906
6. Hemisphaerius bigeminus Melichar, 1906
7. Hemisphaerius bimaculatus Che, Zhang & Wang, 2006
8. Hemisphaerius binduseni Constant & Jiaranaisakul, 2020
9. Hemisphaerius bipunctatus Melichar, 1906
10. Hemisphaerius bresseeli Constant & Pham, 2024
11. Hemisphaerius cassidoides Walker, 1862
12. Hemisphaerius cattienensis Constant & Pham, 2011
13. Hemisphaerius celebensis Melichar, 1906
14. Hemisphaerius cervinus Walker, 1870
15. Hemisphaerius chloris Melichar, 1906
16. Hemisphaerius chlorophanus Melichar, 1906
17. Hemisphaerius cinctus Melichar, 1906
18. Hemisphaerius circumcinctus Stål, 1863
19. Hemisphaerius coccinelloides (Burmeister, 1834) - type species
20. Hemisphaerius collaris Walker, 1870
21. Hemisphaerius concolor Walker, 1870
22. Hemisphaerius corvinus Melichar, 1906
23. Hemisphaerius cruentatus Butler, 1875
24. Hemisphaerius dilatatus Walker, 1870
25. Hemisphaerius elegantulus Melichar, 1906
26. Hemisphaerius fasciatus Stål, 1863
27. Hemisphaerius flavovariegatus Melichar, 1906
28. Hemisphaerius flavus Butler, 1875
29. Hemisphaerius formosus Melichar, 1913
30. Hemisphaerius frontalis Melichar, 1906
31. Hemisphaerius gagatus Melichar, 1906
32. Hemisphaerius geminatus Melichar, 1906
33. Hemisphaerius hippocrepis Constant & Pham, 2011
34. Hemisphaerius hoozanensis Schumacher, 1915
35. Hemisphaerius imitatus Melichar, 1906
36. Hemisphaerius impexus Melichar, 1906
37. Hemisphaerius interclusus Noualhier, 1896
38. Hemisphaerius javanensis Melichar, 1906
39. Hemisphaerius kotoshonis Matsumura, 1938
40. Hemisphaerius lativitta Walker, 1870
41. Hemisphaerius lunaris Walker, 1870
42. Hemisphaerius lygaeus Melichar, 1906
43. Hemisphaerius lysanias Fennah, 1978
44. Hemisphaerius maculatus Melichar, 1906
45. Hemisphaerius maculipes Melichar, 1906
46. Hemisphaerius moluccanus Kirkaldy, 1913
47. Hemisphaerius monticola Bergroth, 1913
48. Hemisphaerius morio Melichar, 1906
49. Hemisphaerius nigritus Melichar, 1906
50. Hemisphaerius nigrolimbatus Melichar, 1906
51. Hemisphaerius nigrolineatus Walker, 1870
52. Hemisphaerius nitidus Stål, 1870
53. Hemisphaerius noctis Distant, 1916
54. Hemisphaerius palaemon Fennah, 1978
55. Hemisphaerius parenthesis Banks, 1910
56. Hemisphaerius penumbrosus Fennah, 1955
57. Hemisphaerius pissopterus Bergroth, 1913
58. Hemisphaerius plagiatus Walker, 1870
59. Hemisphaerius pulcherrimus Stål, 1863
60. Hemisphaerius pullatus Stål, 1863
61. Hemisphaerius ruficeps Melichar, 1906
62. Hemisphaerius rufovarius Walker, 1858
63. Hemisphaerius rufus Melichar, 1914
64. Hemisphaerius sauteri Schmidt, 1910
65. Hemisphaerius sexvittatus Stål, 1870
66. Hemisphaerius signatus Stål, 1863
67. Hemisphaerius similis Melichar, 1906
68. Hemisphaerius stali Banks, 1910
69. Hemisphaerius subapicalis Butler, 1875
70. Hemisphaerius submaculatus Melichar, 1906
71. Hemisphaerius submarginalis Walker, 1870
72. Hemisphaerius subopacus Bergroth, 1913
73. Hemisphaerius taeniatus Stål, 1863
74. Hemisphaerius tongbiguanensis Chen, Zhang & Chang, 2014
75. Hemisphaerius torpidus Walker, 1857
76. Hemisphaerius transfasciatus Banks, 1910
77. Hemisphaerius triangularis Melichar, 1914
78. Hemisphaerius trimaculatus Banks, 1910
79. Hemisphaerius tristis Stål, 1863
80. Hemisphaerius typicus Walker, 1857
81. Hemisphaerius varicolor Stål, 1870
82. Hemisphaerius variegatus Stål, 1870
83. Hemisphaerius viduus Stål, 1863
84. Hemisphaerius villicus Stål, 1863
85. Hemisphaerius viridis Walker, 1870
86. Hemisphaerius vittiger Stål, 1863
