= Paranipeus =

Scientific classification
- Domain: Eukaryota
- Kingdom: Animalia
- Phylum: Arthropoda
- Class: Insecta
- Order: Hemiptera
- Suborder: Auchenorrhyncha
- Infraorder: Fulgoromorpha
- Family: Issidae
- Genus: Paranipeus; Melichar, 1906
- Species: P. latipes

Binomial name
- Paranipeus latipes Melichar, 1906

Genus of insects

Paranipeus is a genus of issid planthopper containing one species, Paranipeus latipes, native to Brazil.
