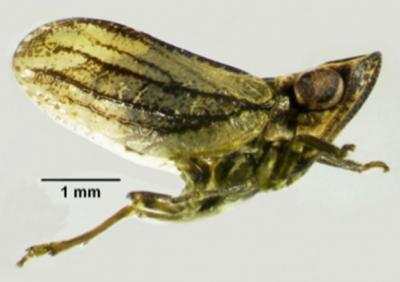
- Female C. baenai

Scientific classification
- Domain: Eukaryota
- Kingdom: Animalia
- Phylum: Arthropoda
- Class: Insecta
- Order: Hemiptera
- Suborder: Auchenorrhyncha
- Infraorder: Fulgoromorpha
- Family: Issidae
- Genus: Conosimus; Mulsant & Rey, 1855

Type species
- Conosimus coelatus

Synonyms
- Sphenidius Soos, 1976

= Conosimus =

Genus of true bugs

Conosimus is a genus of European planthoppers in the family Issidae.

== Species ==
Fulgoromorpha Lists On the Web includes:

1. Conosimus baenai Gnezdilov & Aguin-Pombo, 2014
2. Conosimus coelatus (Mulsant & Rey, 1855)
3. Conosimus horvathi (Soos, 1976)
4. Conosimus malfanus Dlabola, 1987
5. Conosimus noualhieri Puton, 1898
6. Conosimus violantis Ferrari, 1884
