= Torkel Weis-Fogh =

Danish insect flight expert (1922–1975)

- Born: 25 March 1922; Aarhus, Denmark
- Died: 13 November 1975 (aged 53); Cambridge, England
- Education: University of Copenhagen
- Known for: Research on Insect flight; Weis-Fogh principle
- Scientific career
- Fields: Entomology; Aerodynamics
- Workplaces: University of Cambridge; University of Copenhagen
- Doctoral advisor: August Krogh
- Doctoral students: Charles Ellington Bertel Møhl Axel Michelsen

Torkel Weis-Fogh (25 March 1922 – 13 November 1975) was a Danish zoologist and Professor at the University of Cambridge and the University of Copenhagen. He is best known for his contributions to the understanding of insect flight, especially the clap and fling mechanism used by very small insects. James Lighthill named this "the Weis-Fogh mechanism of lift generation".

== Education ==
Weis-Fogh was born in Aarhus and educated at University of Copenhagen.

== Research and career ==
Weis-Fogh was research assistant to the Danish Nobel Prize–winning physiologist August Krogh, where he studied the flight mechanism of the desert locust.

He pioneered studies of insect flight with Krogh in a classic paper of 1951. He then spent a year at the Copenhagen Institute of Neurophysiology.

Weis-Fogh then went to the University of Cambridge in England for four years, where he discovered a rubbery protein, resilin, in insect cuticle. He continued working on insect flight.

He returned to Copenhagen as Professor of Zoophysiology, but went back to Cambridge in 1966 to become Professor of Zoology there, continuing to investigate mechanisms of cell motility and of flight.

=== Insect flight ===
A snapshot of the flows and forces at work in Weis-Fogh's clap and fling mechanism for insect flight. The fragile wings of a thrips create vortices in the air flow, which generate lift.

In 1973 Weis-Fogh devised a mathematical model explaining how extremely small insects such as thrips and chalcid wasps such as Encarsia formosa could fly using clap-and-fling, where conventional steady state aerodynamics did not apply. These insects gain lift by creating vortices near their wings, at the price of the wear and tear from repeated clapping. The British mathematician Sir James Lighthill named this the Weis-Fogh mechanism of lift generation. Weis-Fogh's 1973 paper Quick Estimates of Flight Fitness in Hovering Animals, Including Novel Mechanisms for Lift Production has been cited over 1000 times.

== Awards and honours ==
The Hanne and Torkel Weis-Fogh fund is named in his honour.
