= Lusanda =

Lusanda is a given name. Notable people with the given name include:

- Lusanda Badiyana (born 1996), South African rugby union player
- Lusanda Dumke (1996–2025), South African rugby union player
- Lusanda C. Sangoni (born 1979), known professionally as Lusanda Mbane, South African actress, radio personality, speaker and entrepreneur

== See also ==
- Lawazantiya
