= Oronoqua =

Scientific classification
- Kingdom: Animalia
- Phylum: Arthropoda
- Class: Insecta
- Order: Hemiptera
- Suborder: Auchenorrhyncha
- Infraorder: Fulgoromorpha
- Family: Issidae
- Subfamily: Thioniinae
- Tribe: Thioniini
- Subtribe: Oronoquina; Gnezdilov, 2018
- Genus: Oronoqua; Fennah, 1947

Type species
- Oronoqua deina Fennah, 1947

Genus of insects

Oronoqua is a genus of issid planthopper in the family Issidae and can be found in the northern Neotropics. The difference in fore and hind wing venations between species of Oronoqua and the other genera in Thioniini led to a subtribe Oronoquina being erected.

== Species ==
- Oronoqua deina Fennah, 1947
- Oronoqua feria Gnezdilov & Bartlett, 2020
- Oronoqua ibisca Gnezdilov, Bonfils, Aberlenc & Basset, 2010
- Oronoqua orellana Gnezdilov & Bartlett, 2020
