= Thioniina =

Scientific classification
- Kingdom: Animalia
- Phylum: Arthropoda
- Class: Insecta
- Order: Hemiptera
- Suborder: Auchenorrhyncha
- Infraorder: Fulgoromorpha
- Family: Issidae
- Tribe: Thioniini
- Subtribe: Thioniina; Melichar, 1906

Genera
- Aplos Gnezdilov, 2018; Cheiloceps Uhler, 1895; Fowlerium Gnezdilov, 2018; Thionia Stal, 1859

Subtribe of planthoppers

Thioniina is a subtribe of planthoppers in the tribe Thioniini. It contains 4 genera.
