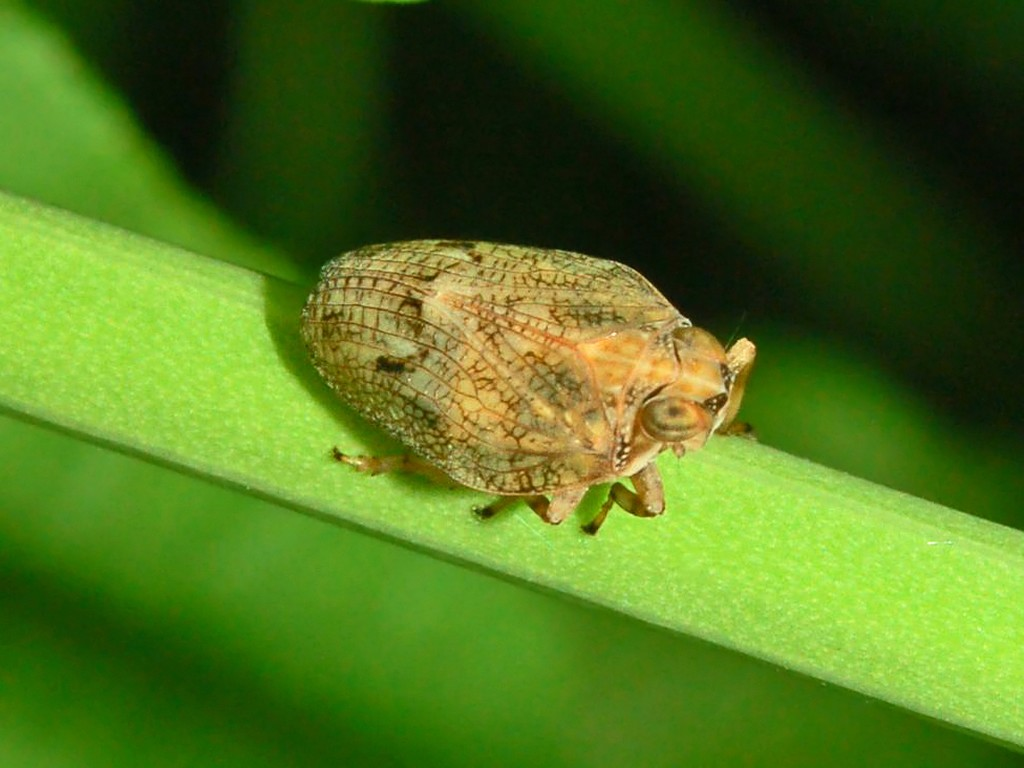
- Issus coleoptratus

Scientific classification
- Kingdom: Animalia
- Phylum: Arthropoda
- Clade: Pancrustacea
- Class: Insecta
- Order: Hemiptera
- Suborder: Auchenorrhyncha
- Infraorder: Fulgoromorpha
- Superfamily: Fulgoroidea
- Family: Issidae; Spinola, 1839

Subfamilies and Tribes
- See text

= Issidae =

Issidae Temporal range: Paleocene–Recent

Family of planthoppers

Issidae is a family of planthoppers described by Spinola in 1839, belonging to the order Hemiptera, suborder Auchenorrhyncha superfamily Fulgoroidea.

== Distribution ==
Species of this family are present throughout the Northern Hemisphere.

== Description ==
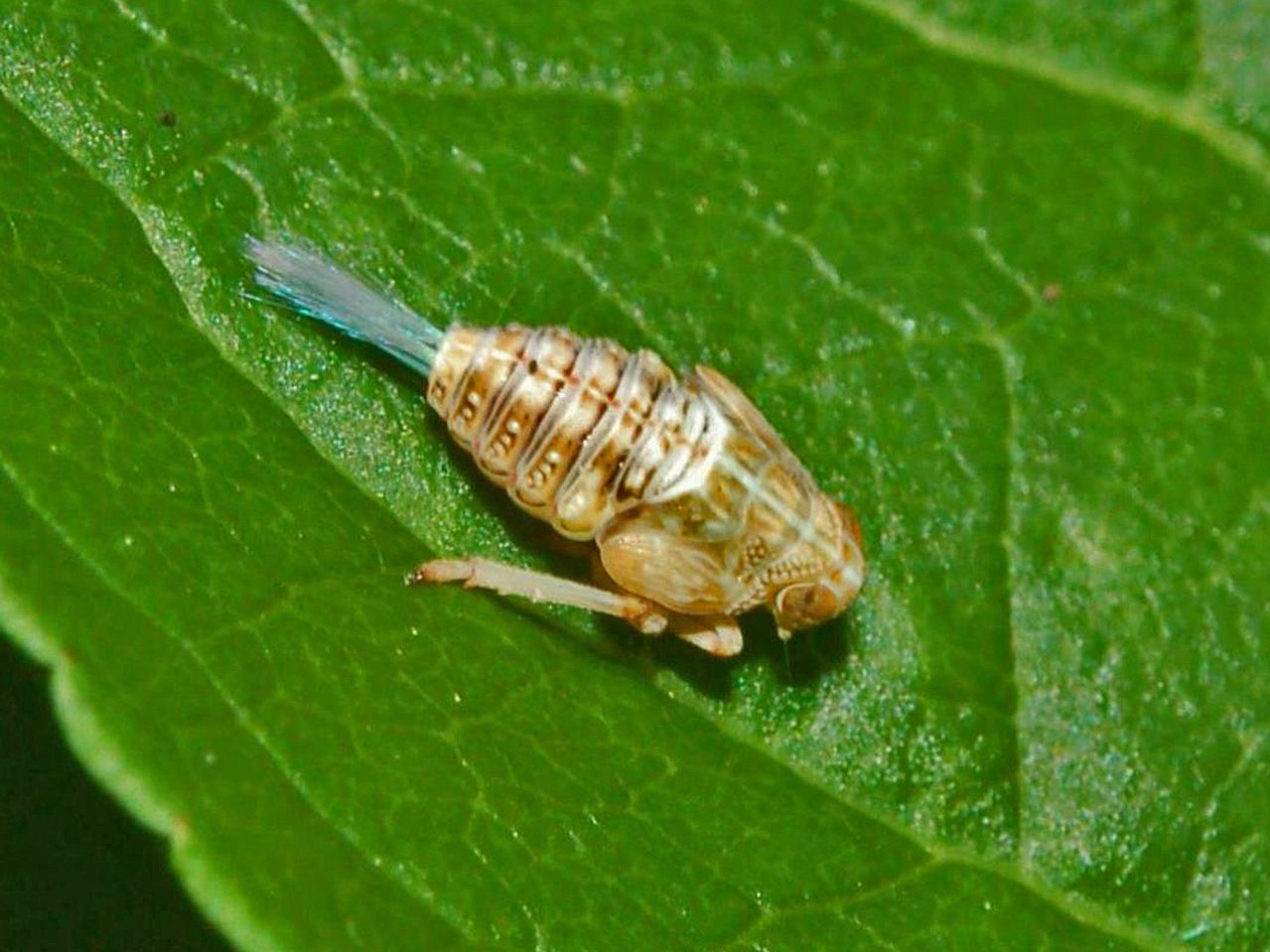
Issid nymph

Issidae are small insects generally with a stocky body, as the wings mainly develop in width. Basic body coloration is not striking, usually shows brownish colors. The head has two ocelli. The forewings have strong pronounced ribs. They wrap the abdomen when the insect is at rest. The family originally included approximately 1000 species with 215 genera, but the systematics of Issidae remains uncertain, with many of the subfamilies having been recently removed to separate families, including Caliscelidae. Nogodinidae, and Tropiduchidae.

In 2013, scientists described a biologically unique set of mechanical gears in an Issus nymph, though identical structures are known in most planthoppers, and were known for decades before the function of the gears was discovered.

== Taxonomy ==
The family Issidae was once large and included many groups which are now treated in other families or as families themselves. These groups include the Caliscelidae, Nogodinidae, and Tropiduchidae (e.g., subfamilies Tonginae and Trienopinae). Around 2003, there was a view in favour of a single subfamily Issinae, but the current consensus is placement in four (as below). The Catalogue of Life lists genera in five tribes Issini, Parahiraciini, Hemisphaeriini and Thioniini. The tribe Colpopterini have now been placed in family Nogodinidae Melichar, 1898 having been raised to a subfamily. The oldest fossil of the group is Cubicostissus of the Paleocene Menat Formation of France, belonging to the tribe Hysteropterini, molecular clock calibrations suggest a diversification during the Upper Cretaceous.

=== Subfamilies, tribes and selected genera ===
Fulgoromorpha Lists On the Web lists four subfamilies:

==== Hemisphaeriinae ====
Authority: Melichar, 1906

- Eupilisini Gnezdilov, 2020
  - Bornepilis Gnezdilov, 2020
  - Eupilis Walker, 1857
  - Gabaloeca Walker, 1870
  - Syrgis Stål, 1870
- Hemisphaeriini Melichar, 1906
  - Hemisphaeriina Melichar, 1906
    - Ceratogergithus Gnezdilov, 2017
    - Choutagus Zhang, Wang & Che, 2006
    - Epyhemisphaerius Chan & Yang, 1994
    - Gergithoides Schumacher, 1915
    - Gergithus Stål, 1870
    - Hemisphaerius Schaum, 1850
    - Maculergithus Constant & Pham, 2016
    - Neogergithoides Sun, Meng & Wang, 2012
    - Neohemisphaerius Chen, Zhang & Chang, 2014
    - Ophthalmosphaerius Gnezdilov, 2017
    - Rotundiforma Meng, Wang & Qin, 2013
  - Mongolianina Wang, Zhang & Bourgoin, 2016
    - (8 genera)
- Kodaianellini Wang, Zhang & Bourgoin, 2016
  - (6 genera)
- Parahiraciini Cheng & Yang, 1991
  - †Bolbossus Gnezdilov & Bourgoin, 2016 Baltic amber, Eocene (Priabonian)
  - Parahiraciina Cheng & Yang, 1991
    - (24 genera)
  - Scantiniina Bourgoin & Wang, 2020
    - Scantinius Stål, 1866
  - Vindilisina Bourgoin & Wang, 2020
    - Nisoprincessa Gnezdilov, 2017
    - Vindilis Stål, 1870
- Sarimini Wang, Zhang & Bourgoin, 2016
  - (30 genera)
- Hemisphaeriinae incertae sedis
  - Amphiscepa Germar, 1830
  - Brahmaloka Distant, 1906
  - Chimetopina Gnezdilov, 2017
    - Cascaruna Gnezdilov, 2017
    - Chimetopon Schmidt, 1910
    - Ikonza Hesse, 1925
  - Coruncanius Distant, 1916
  - Devagama Distant, 1906
  - Hemisobium Schmidt, 1911
  - Jagannata Distant, 1906
  - Katonella Schmidt, 1911
  - Kivupterum Dlabola, 1985
  - Kodaiana Distant, 1916
  - Narayana Distant, 1906
  - Orinda Kirkaldy, 1907
  - Picumna Stål, 1864
  - Radha Melichar, 1903
  - Redarator Distant, 1916
  - Samantiga Distant, 1906
  - Tatva Distant, 1906
  - Thabenoides Distant, 1916

==== Hysteropterinae ====
Authority: Melichar, 1906; there are currently 59 genera including:

- Agalmatium Emeljanov, 1971
- Falcidius Stål, 1866
- Hysteropterum Amyot & Audinet-Serville, 1843 - type genus
- †Cubicostissus Bourgoin & Nel, 2020 Menat Formation, France, Paleocene (Selandian)

==== Issinae ====
The monotypic subfamily contains the sole tribe Issini Spinola, 1839 and has a widespread distribution in Europe, the Middle East and temperate Asia. There are currently ten genera:

- Carimeta Gnezdilov, 2020
- Cophteroma Gnezdilov, 2020
- Cyclometa Gnezdilov, 2020
- †Issites Haupt, 1956 Germany, Eocene (Lutetian)
- Issus Brullé, 1832 – type genus
- Latissus Dlabola, 1974
- Memusta Gnezdilov, 2020
- Metopasius Gnezdilov, 2020
- Sinonissus Wang, Shi & Bourgoin, 2018
- Thiopara Gnezdilov, 2020

==== Thioniinae ====
Authority: Melichar, 1906 There are currently 3 tribes and 16 genera:

- Cordelini Gnezdilov, 2019 (1 genus)
  - Cordela Gnezdilov, 2019
- Guianaphrynini Gnezdilov, 2018 (1 genus)
  - Guianaphryna Gnezdilov, 2018
- Thioniini Melichar, 1906 (14 genera)
  - Amnisa Stal, 1862
  - Diceroptera Gnezdilov, 2011
  - Dracela Signoret, 1861
  - Heremon Kirkaldy, 1903
  - Oronoquina Gnezdilov, 2018 (1 genus)
    - Oronoqua Fennah, 1947
  - Paranipeus Melichar, 1906
  - Proteinissus Fowler, 1904
  - Thioniamorpha Metcalf, 1938
  - Thioniella Metcalf, 1938
  - Thioniina Melichar, 1906
    - Aplos Gnezdilov, 2018
    - Cheiloceps Uhler, 1895
    - Fowlerium Gnezdilov, 2018
    - Thionia Stal, 1859
  - Waoraniina Gnezdilov & Bartlett, 2018 (1 genus)
    - Waorania Gnezdilov & Bartlett, 2018

==== Issidae incertae sedis ====
Twenty genera are currently placed here:

- Abolloptera Gnezdilov & O'Brien, 2006
- Argepara Gnezdilov & O'Brien, 2008
- Aztecus Gnezdilov & O'Brien, 2008
- Balduza Gnezdilov & O'Brien, 2006
- Bumaya Gnezdilov & O'Brien, 2008
- Carydiopterum Gnezdilov, 2017
- Delongana Caldwell, 1945
- Exortus Gnezdilov, 2004
- Gilda Walker, 1870
- Incasa Gnezdilov & O'Brien, 2008
- Kathleenum Gnezdilov, 2004
- Paralixes Caldwell, 1945
- Sarnus Stål, 1866
- Stilbometopius Gnezdilov & O'Brien, 2006
- Traxanellus Caldwell, 1945
- Traxus Metcalf, 1923
- Tylanira Ball, 1936
- Ulixes Stål, 1861
- Ulixoides Haupt, 1918

Uphodato Szwedo 2019, Krundia Szwedo 2019 and Breukoscelis Szwedo 2019 from the Bembridge Marls, England dating Eocene (Priabonian) were considered members of this family upon description, however, other authors have found assignation to Issidae dubious.
