= 2001 in paleontology =

Paleontology or palaeontology is the study of prehistoric life forms on Earth through the examination of plant and animal fossils. This includes the study of body fossils, tracks (ichnites), burrows, cast-off parts, fossilised feces (coprolites), palynomorphs and chemical residues. Because humans have encountered fossils for millennia, paleontology has a long history both before and after becoming formalized as a science. This article records significant discoveries and events related to paleontology that occurred or were published in the year 2001.

== Plants ==
=== Pteridophyta ===
| Name | Novelty | Status | Authors | Age | Unit | Location | Notes | Images |
|---|---|---|---|---|---|---|---|---|
| Wessiea | gen et sp nov | Valid | Pigg & Rothwell | Langhian (Middle Miocene) | "Ho ho" site, Grande Ronde Basalt. | USA | A fern, type sp W. yakimaensis | |

=== Conifers ===
| Name | Novelty | Status | Authors | Age | Unit | Location | Notes | Images |
|---|---|---|---|---|---|---|---|---|
| Metasequoia foxii | sp nov | Valid | Stockey, Rothwell, & Falder | late Tiffanian | Munce's Hill and Gao mine sites, Paskapoo Formation | Canada | | |

=== Angiosperms ===
| Name | Novelty | Status | Authors | Age | Unit | Location | Notes | Images |
|---|---|---|---|---|---|---|---|---|
| Trochodendron nastae | sp nov | Valid | Pigg, Wehr, & Ickert-Bond | Ypresian | Tom Thumb Tuff, Klondike Mountain Formation | USA | A Trochodendron species | Trochodendron nastae |

== Arthropods ==
=== Crustaceans ===
==== Research ====
- Guinot and Tavares (2001) reviews the concept of Podotremata and establishes the family Etyidae.

==== New taxa ====
| Name | Novelty | Status | Authors | Age | Type locality | Country | Notes | Images |
|---|---|---|---|---|---|---|---|---|
| Archaeopus lunicarina | Sp nov | | Schweitzer & Feldmann | Cretaceous; Late Campanian - Maastrichtian | Matanuska Formation | US; Alaska | A retroplumid crab | |
| Brecanclawu | Gen et sp nov | | Schweitzer & Feldmann | Eocene | Twin River Group; Hoko River Formation | US; Washington | A possible callianassid ghost shrimp The type species is B. rathbunae | |
| Callianopsis? inornatus | Sp nov | | Schweitzer & Feldmann | Eocene | Twin River Group; Hoko River Formation | US; Washington | A callianassid ghost shrimp of uncertain generic affinity. | |
| Ctenocheles hokoensis | Sp nov | | Schweitzer & Feldmann | Eocene | Twin River Group; Hoko River Formation | US; Washington | A possible ctenochelid ghost shrimp | |
| Eucorystes platys | Sp nov | | Schweitzer & Feldmann | Cretaceous; Albian | Hudspeth Formation | US; Oregon | A palaeocorystine frog crab. | |
| Feldmannia | Gen et comb nov | Valid | Guinot & Tavares | Early Cretaceous (Albian) | Paw Paw Formation | USA (Texas) | An etyid crab, type species is F. wintoni, originally named as Xanthosia wintoni in 1935. | |
| Glyphea micheleae | Sp nov | | Schweitzer & Feldmann | Eocene; Lutetian | Aldwell Formation? | USA; Washington | A glypheid glypheoid lobster species. | |
| Hoploparia tshudy | Sp nov | | Schweitzer & Feldmann | Cretaceous late Albian - late Cenomanian | Moonshine Creek Formation | US; Alaska | A nephropid lobster sp. | |
| Paguristes hokoensis | Sp nov | | Schweitzer & Feldmann | Eocene | Twin River Group; Hoko River Formation | US; Washington | A Diogenid hermit crab species. | |
| Pagurus malloryi | Sp nov | | Schweitzer & Feldmann | Oligocene | Makah Formation; Jansen Creek Member | US; Washington | A Diogenid hermit crab species. | |
| Palaeastacus trisulcatus | Sp nov | | Schweitzer & Feldmann | Cretaceous; Cenomanian | Antelope Shale | US; California | A erymid glypheoid lobster species. | |
| Palaeopentacheles? starri | Sp nov | | Schweitzer & Feldmann | Oligocene | Makah Formation | US; Washington | A Polychelid benthic crustacean sp. of uncertain generic affinity. | |
| Secretanella | Gen et comb nov | Valid | Guinot & Tavares | Late Cretaceous (Cenomanian) | | Madagascar | A crab belonging to Heterotremata, type species is S. arcuata, originally named as Xanthosia arcuata in 1964. | |

=== Insects ===
| Name | Novelty | Status | Authors | Age | Type locality | Country | Notes | Images |
|---|---|---|---|---|---|---|---|---|
| Electromyrmococcus | Gen et sp nov | Valid | Williams | Burdigalian (Miocene) | Dominican amber | Dominican Republic | A Coccoidea scale insect | Electromyrmococcus abductus in the jaws of Acropyga glaesaria |
| Palaeopsychops | Gen et 4 sp nov | valid | Andersen | Ypresian | Fur Formation | Denmark | An ithionid giant lacewing Type species P. latifasciatus, also includes P. abruptus, P. angustifasciatus, and P. maculatus | |
| Tainosia | Gen et sp nov | Valid | Szwedo & Stroiński | Burdigalian (Miocene) | Dominican amber | Dominican Republic | A nogodinid frog hopper | |

== Fishes ==
=== Newly named bony fishes ===
| Name | Status | Authors | Age | Unit | Location | Notes | Images |
|---|---|---|---|---|---|---|---|
| Achoania | Valid | Zhu; Yu; Ahlberg | Early Devonian | Xitun Formation | China | The type species is Achoania jarvikii. | |
| Westollrhynchus | Valid | Schultze | Early Devonian | Bear Rock Formation | Canada | A new genus for "Speonesydrion" lehmanni. | |

== Amphibians ==
=== Newly named amphibians ===
| Name | Status | Authors | Age | Unit | Location | Notes | Images |
|---|---|---|---|---|---|---|---|
| Mesophryne | Valid | Gao; Shubin | Late Jurassic | Yixian Formation | China | The type species is Mesophryne beipiaoensis. | |
| Nezpercius | Valid | Blob; Carrano; Rogers; Forster; Espinoza | Upper Cretaceous | Judith River Formation | USA | The type species is Nezpercius dodsoni. | |
| Sinerpeton | Valid | Gao; Shubin | Late Jurassic | Zhangjiakou Formation | China | The type species is Sinerpeton fengshanensis. | |

== Ichthyosaurs ==
| Name | Status | Authors | Age | Unit | Location | Notes | Images |
|---|---|---|---|---|---|---|---|
| Metashastasaurus | Synonymy | Nichollis; Manabe | Late Triassic | Pardonet Formation | Canada | A new genus for "Shastasaurus" neoscapularis. A junior synonymy of Callawayia Maisch & Matzke, 2000. | |

== Turtles ==
=== Newly named turtles ===
| Name | Status | Authors | Age | Unit | Location | Notes | Images |
|---|---|---|---|---|---|---|---|
| Caribemys | Valid | de la Fuente; Iturralde-Vinent | Upper Jurassic | Jagua Formation | Cuba | The type species is Caribemys oxfordiensis. | |
| Cearachelys | Valid | Gaffney; Campos; Hirayama | Early Cretaceous | Santana Formation | Brazil | The type species is Cearachelys placidoi. | |
| Kurmademys | Valid | Gaffney; Chatterjee; Rudra | Late Cretaceous | Kallamedu Formation | India | The type species is Kurmademys kallamedensis. | |

== Lepidosauromorphs ==
=== Newly named basal lepidosauromorphs ===
| Name | Status | Authors | Age | Unit | Location | Notes | Images |
|---|---|---|---|---|---|---|---|
| Hypuronector | Valid | Colbert; Olsen | Late Triassic | Lockatong Formation | USA | The type species is Hypuronector limnaios. | |

=== Newly named plesiosaurs ===
| Name | Status | Authors | Age | Unit | Location | Notes | Images |
|---|---|---|---|---|---|---|---|
| Hauffiosaurus | Valid | O'Keefe | Lower Jurassic | Posidonia Shale Formation | Germany | The type species is Hauffiosaurus zanoni. | Hauffiosaurus |

=== Newly named sphenodonts ===
| Name | Status | Authors | Age | Unit | Location | Notes | Images |
|---|---|---|---|---|---|---|---|
| Godavarisaurus | Valid | Evans; Prasad; Manhas | Early Jurassic | Kota Formation | India | The type species is Godavarisaurus latefi. | |
| Rebbanasaurus | Valid | Evans; Prasad; Manhas | Early Jurassic | Kota Formation | India | The type species is Rebbanasaurus jani. | |

== Archosauromorphs ==
=== Newly named basal archosauromorphs ===
| Name | Status | Authors | Age | Unit | Location | Notes | Images |
|---|---|---|---|---|---|---|---|
| Yonghesuchus | Valid | Wu; Liu; Li | Upper Triassic | Tongchuan Formation | China | The type species is Yonghesuchus sangbiensis. | |

=== Newly named pseudosuchians ===
| Name | Novelty | Status | Authors | Age | Unit | Location | Notes | Images |
|---|---|---|---|---|---|---|---|---|
| Mekosuchus sanderi | Sp. nov. | Valid | Willis | Early Miocene | Ringtail Site of the Riversleigh World Heritage Area | Australia | A mekosuchinae crocodilian. It is the youngest known species of Mekosuchus from the Australian mainland. | |
| Pabwehshi | Gen. et sp. nov | Valid | Wilson, Malkani & Gingerich | Upper Cretaceous | Pab Formation | Pakistan | The type species is Pabwehshi pakistanensis. | |
| Rugosuchus | Gen. et. sp. nov | Valid | Wu, Wu & Russell | Lower Cretaceous | ?Nenjiang Formation | China | The type species is Rugosuchus nonganensis. | |
| Stratiotosuchus | Gen. et sp. nov. | Valid | Campos et al. | Upper Cretaceous | Adamantina Formation | Brazil | The type species is Stratiotosuchus maxhechti. | |

=== Newly named dinosaurs ===
Data courtesy of George Olshevsky's dinosaur genera list.

| Name | Status | Authors | Age | Unit | Location | Notes | Images |
|---|---|---|---|---|---|---|---|
| Aletopelta | Valid | Ford; James Kirkland | | Point Loma Formation | USA (California) | A 20-foot-long (6.1 m) ankylosaurid. Apparently, before being fossilized, the animal's bloated carcass had floated out to sea and formed a miniature reef environment after it sank to the bottom. | Aletopelta Citipati Gobisaurus Hesperosaurus Khaan Masiakasaurus had a unique jaw configuration with projecting teeth. Nothronychus Megapnosaurus Paralititan Rapetosaurus |
| Bienosaurus | Valid | Dong Zhiming | | Lower Lufeng Formation | China | A primitive scelidosaurid known from scant remains. | Aletopelta Citipati Gobisaurus Hesperosaurus Khaan Masiakasaurus had a unique jaw configuration with projecting teeth. Nothronychus Megapnosaurus Paralititan Rapetosaurus |
| Cedarpelta | Valid | Kenneth Carpenter; James Kirkland et al. (Note: Kenneth Carpenter, James Kirkland, Burge, Bird.) | | Cedar Mountain Formation | USA | The most basal known ankylosaurid. | Aletopelta Citipati Gobisaurus Hesperosaurus Khaan Masiakasaurus had a unique jaw configuration with projecting teeth. Nothronychus Megapnosaurus Paralititan Rapetosaurus |
| Citipati | Valid | James M. Clark; Mark Norell; Rinchen Barsbold | | Djadokhta Formation | Mongolia | A relatively large oviraptorid known to brood its nests. | Aletopelta Citipati Gobisaurus Hesperosaurus Khaan Masiakasaurus had a unique jaw configuration with projecting teeth. Nothronychus Megapnosaurus Paralititan Rapetosaurus |
| Draconyx | Valid | Octávio Mateus; Antunes | | Lourinhã Formation | Portugal | A relative of Camptosaurus. | Aletopelta Citipati Gobisaurus Hesperosaurus Khaan Masiakasaurus had a unique jaw configuration with projecting teeth. Nothronychus Megapnosaurus Paralititan Rapetosaurus |
| Eotyrannus | Valid | Hutt; Naish et al. (Note: Hutt, Naish, Martill, Barker, Newberry.) | | Wessex Formation | UK | A twenty-foot tyrannosauroid. | Aletopelta Citipati Gobisaurus Hesperosaurus Khaan Masiakasaurus had a unique jaw configuration with projecting teeth. Nothronychus Megapnosaurus Paralititan Rapetosaurus |
| Eshanosaurus | Valid | Xu Xing; Zhao Xijin; James M. Clark | | Lower Lufeng Formation | China | A therizinosaur, possibly the earliest known coelurosaur. | Aletopelta Citipati Gobisaurus Hesperosaurus Khaan Masiakasaurus had a unique jaw configuration with projecting teeth. Nothronychus Megapnosaurus Paralititan Rapetosaurus |
| Gobisaurus | Valid | Matthew K. Vickaryous; Anthony P. Russell et al. (Note: Matthew K. Vickaryous, Anthony P. Russell, Phillip Currie, Zhao Xijin.) | | Ulansuhai Formation | China | An ankylosaurid that resembled Shamosaurus. | Aletopelta Citipati Gobisaurus Hesperosaurus Khaan Masiakasaurus had a unique jaw configuration with projecting teeth. Nothronychus Megapnosaurus Paralititan Rapetosaurus |
| "Hanwulosaurus" | Nomen nudum | Anonymous | | | China | A thirty-foot ankylosaur. | Aletopelta Citipati Gobisaurus Hesperosaurus Khaan Masiakasaurus had a unique jaw configuration with projecting teeth. Nothronychus Megapnosaurus Paralititan Rapetosaurus |
| "Heilongjiangosaurus" | Nomen nudum | Li W. Jin J. | | | China | A hadrosaur, possibly synonymous with Charonosaurus. | Aletopelta Citipati Gobisaurus Hesperosaurus Khaan Masiakasaurus had a unique jaw configuration with projecting teeth. Nothronychus Megapnosaurus Paralititan Rapetosaurus |
| Hesperosaurus | Valid | Kenneth Carpenter; Miles; Cloward | | Morrison Formation | USA | A stegosaurid slightly older and more primitive than Stegosaurus, although the genera may be synonymous. | Aletopelta Citipati Gobisaurus Hesperosaurus Khaan Masiakasaurus had a unique jaw configuration with projecting teeth. Nothronychus Megapnosaurus Paralititan Rapetosaurus |
| Jiangshanosaurus | Valid | Tang F. Kang et al. (Note: Tang F., Kang, Jin X., Wei, Wu W. T.) | | | China | A titanosaur known only from a partial skeleton found near Lixian Village, China. | Aletopelta Citipati Gobisaurus Hesperosaurus Khaan Masiakasaurus had a unique jaw configuration with projecting teeth. Nothronychus Megapnosaurus Paralititan Rapetosaurus |
| Jinzhousaurus | Valid | Wang X. Xu Xing | | Yixian Formation | China | A hadrosauroid known from a nearly complete skeleton. | Aletopelta Citipati Gobisaurus Hesperosaurus Khaan Masiakasaurus had a unique jaw configuration with projecting teeth. Nothronychus Megapnosaurus Paralititan Rapetosaurus |
| Khaan | Valid | James M. Clark; Mark Norell; Rinchen Barsbold | | Djadochta Formation | Mongolia | A fairly typical oviraptorid once misidentified as Ingenia. | Aletopelta Citipati Gobisaurus Hesperosaurus Khaan Masiakasaurus had a unique jaw configuration with projecting teeth. Nothronychus Megapnosaurus Paralititan Rapetosaurus |
| "Kittysaurus" | Junior synonym of Eotyrannus | Hargreaves | | Wessex Formation | UK | | Aletopelta Citipati Gobisaurus Hesperosaurus Khaan Masiakasaurus had a unique jaw configuration with projecting teeth. Nothronychus Megapnosaurus Paralititan Rapetosaurus |
| Liaoningosaurus | Valid | Xu Xing; Wang X. You | | Yixian Formation | China | A bizarre ankylosaur of uncertain classification. Known from the complete specimen of a juvenile 34 cm long, it's the smallest known ankylosaur to date. | Aletopelta Citipati Gobisaurus Hesperosaurus Khaan Masiakasaurus had a unique jaw configuration with projecting teeth. Nothronychus Megapnosaurus Paralititan Rapetosaurus |
| Losillasaurus | Valid | Maria Lourdes Casanovas-Cladellas; Santafe; Sanz | | Villar del Arzobispo Formation | Spain | A large turiasaur known from a partial subadult skeleton. | Aletopelta Citipati Gobisaurus Hesperosaurus Khaan Masiakasaurus had a unique jaw configuration with projecting teeth. Nothronychus Megapnosaurus Paralititan Rapetosaurus |
| Masiakasaurus | Valid | Sampson; Carrano; Forster | Late Cretaceous (Maastrichtian) | Maevarano Formation | Madagascar | A 2-meter (about 6–7 feet) noasaurid with unusual forward-pointing teeth. | Aletopelta Citipati Gobisaurus Hesperosaurus Khaan Masiakasaurus had a unique jaw configuration with projecting teeth. Nothronychus Megapnosaurus Paralititan Rapetosaurus |
| Megapnosaurus | Valid | Ivie; Slipinski; Wegrzynowicz | | | South Africa; Zimbabwe | Replacement name for Syntarsus Raath, 1969 non Fairmaire, 1869; a coelophysid theropod. | Aletopelta Citipati Gobisaurus Hesperosaurus Khaan Masiakasaurus had a unique jaw configuration with projecting teeth. Nothronychus Megapnosaurus Paralititan Rapetosaurus |
| Neimongosaurus | Valid | Zhang X. H. Xu Xing et al. (Note: Zhang X. H., Xu Xing, Zhao X., Paul Sereno, Kuang, Tan L.) | | Iren Dabasu Formation | China | A therizinosaur about 2.3 meters in length. | Aletopelta Citipati Gobisaurus Hesperosaurus Khaan Masiakasaurus had a unique jaw configuration with projecting teeth. Nothronychus Megapnosaurus Paralititan Rapetosaurus |
| Nothronychus | Valid | James Kirkland Wolfe | Late Cretaceous (Turonian) | Moreno Hill Formation | USA | A therizinosaur. | Aletopelta Citipati Gobisaurus Hesperosaurus Khaan Masiakasaurus had a unique jaw configuration with projecting teeth. Nothronychus Megapnosaurus Paralititan Rapetosaurus |
| Paralititan | Valid | J. B. Smith; Lamanna et al. (Note: J. B. Smith, Lamanna, Lacovara, Dodson, J. R. Smith, Poole, Giegengack, Attia.) | | Bahariya Formation | Egypt | A titanosaur and of the most massive dinosaurs ever discovered, with an estimated weight of 59 tonnes (65 short tons) and length of around 26 meters (85 ft). | Aletopelta Citipati Gobisaurus Hesperosaurus Khaan Masiakasaurus had a unique jaw configuration with projecting teeth. Nothronychus Megapnosaurus Paralititan Rapetosaurus |
| Planicoxa | Valid | DiCroce; Kenneth Carpenter | | Cedar Mountain Formation | USA | An advanced iguanodontian. | Aletopelta Citipati Gobisaurus Hesperosaurus Khaan Masiakasaurus had a unique jaw configuration with projecting teeth. Nothronychus Megapnosaurus Paralititan Rapetosaurus |
| Pukyongosaurus | Valid | Dong Zhiming; Paik; Kim H. J. | | Hasandong Formation | South Korea | A titanosauriform related to Euhelopus. | Aletopelta Citipati Gobisaurus Hesperosaurus Khaan Masiakasaurus had a unique jaw configuration with projecting teeth. Nothronychus Megapnosaurus Paralititan Rapetosaurus |
| Quilmesaurus | Valid | Rodolfo Coria | | Allen Formation | Argentina | A 5–6 meters (16–20 feet) theropod known from a partial leg. | Aletopelta Citipati Gobisaurus Hesperosaurus Khaan Masiakasaurus had a unique jaw configuration with projecting teeth. Nothronychus Megapnosaurus Paralititan Rapetosaurus |
| Rapetosaurus | Valid | Kristina Curry-Rogers; Catherine A. Forster | Late Cretaceous (Maastrichtian) | Maevarano Formation | Madagascar | A 15 metres (49 ft) titanosaur. | Aletopelta Citipati Gobisaurus Hesperosaurus Khaan Masiakasaurus had a unique jaw configuration with projecting teeth. Nothronychus Megapnosaurus Paralititan Rapetosaurus |
| Ruehleia | Valid | Peter Galton. | | Knollenmergel | Germany | A prosauropod named for Hugo Ruehle von Lilienstern. | Aletopelta Citipati Gobisaurus Hesperosaurus Khaan Masiakasaurus had a unique jaw configuration with projecting teeth. Nothronychus Megapnosaurus Paralititan Rapetosaurus |
| Wellnhoferia | Valid non-dinosaurian taxon | Andrzej Elżanowski | | Solnhofen Limestone | Germany | Very similar to Archaeopteryx, which may be its senior synonym. | Aletopelta Citipati Gobisaurus Hesperosaurus Khaan Masiakasaurus had a unique jaw configuration with projecting teeth. Nothronychus Megapnosaurus Paralititan Rapetosaurus |
| Venenosaurus | Valid | Tidwell; Kenneth Carpenter; S. Meyer | Early Cretaceous (early Aptian) | Cedar Mountain Formation (Poison Strip Member) | USA | A relatively small (probably around 10 m (33 ft) long) titanosauriform sauropod, known from an incomplete skeleton of an adult and a juvenile. Its tail vertebrae articulated in a unique fashion that may be of evolutionary significance. | Aletopelta Citipati Gobisaurus Hesperosaurus Khaan Masiakasaurus had a unique jaw configuration with projecting teeth. Nothronychus Megapnosaurus Paralititan Rapetosaurus |
| "Yibinosaurus" | Nomen nudum | Ouyang vide: Anonymous | | | China | An undescribed sauropod. | Aletopelta Citipati Gobisaurus Hesperosaurus Khaan Masiakasaurus had a unique jaw configuration with projecting teeth. Nothronychus Megapnosaurus Paralititan Rapetosaurus |
| Yunxianosaurus | Valid | Li | Late Cretaceous | | China | A titanosaur sauropod. | Aletopelta Citipati Gobisaurus Hesperosaurus Khaan Masiakasaurus had a unique jaw configuration with projecting teeth. Nothronychus Megapnosaurus Paralititan Rapetosaurus |

=== Newly named birds ===
| Name | Novelty | Status | Authors | Age | Unit | Location | Notes | Images |
|---|---|---|---|---|---|---|---|---|
| Aegypius prepyrenaicus | Sp. nov. | Valid? | Hernández Carrasquilla | Late Pleistocene | Cave depositions | Spain: Aragon | According to Sanchez Marco (2007), it is a nomen dubium. | |
| Apsaravis | Gen. nov. et Sp. nov. | Valid | Mark A. Norell Julia A. Clarke | Late Cretaceous | Djadokhta Formation | Mongolia | The type species is Apsaravis ukhaana. | |
| Belgirallus | Gen. nov. et 2 Sp. nov. | Valid | Gerald Mayr Richard Smith | Early Oligocene | MP 21 | Belgium: Flemish Brabant | A Rallidae, genus contains two species: B. oligocaenus (type species) and B. minutus. | |
| Boutersemia | Gen. nov. et 2 Sp. nov. | Valid | Gerald Mayr Richard Smith | Early Oligocene | MP 21 | Belgium: Flemish Brabant | A possible Glareolidae, genus contains two species: B. belgica (type species) and B. parvula | |
| Calonectris krantzi | Sp. nov. | Valid | Storrs L. Olson Pamela C. Rasmussen | Early Pliocene | Yorktown Formation | USA: North Carolina | A Procellariidae. | |
| Collocalia buday | Sp. nov. | Valid | Walter E. Boles | Early Miocene | Riversleigh | Australia: Queensland | An Apodidae. | |
| Ducula lakeba | Sp. nov. | Valid | Trevor H. Worthy | Quaternary | Lakeba Island | Fiji | A Columbidae. | |
| Emuarius guljaruba | Sp. nov. | Valid | Walter E. Boles | Late Oligocene | Etadunna Formation | Australia: South Australia | A Dromaiidae. | |
| Eocolius | Gen. nov. et Sp. nov. | Valid | Gareth J. Dyke David M. Waterhouse | Early Eocene | MP 8 | UK: England | A stem Coliiformes; the type species is Eocolius walkeri. | |
| Eocrex tagusevae | Sp. nov. | Valid | Andrei V. Panteleyev | Paleogene (Late Eocene-?Early Oligocene) | | Tajikistan | A Rallidae. | |
| Falco kurochkini | Sp. nov. | Valid | William Suárez Duque Storrs L. Olson | Quaternary | Cave deposits | Cuba | A Falconidae. | |
| Fluvioviridavis | Gen. nov. et Sp. nov. | Valid | Gerald Mayr Michael Daniels | Early Eocene | Green River Formation | USA: Wyoming | A Podargiformes, the type species is Fluvioviridavis platyrhamphus. | |
| Gavia fortis | Sp. nov. | Valid | Storrs L. Olson Pamela C. Rasmussen | Early Pliocene | Yorktown Formation | USA: North Carolina | A Gaviidae. | |
| Laputavis | Gen. nov. et Sp. nov. | Valid | Gareth J. Dyke | Early Eocene | Ypresian, London Clay Formation, MP 8 | UK: England | A stem Apodiformes, the genus was originally named Laputa but that name was preoccupied; the type species is Laputavis robusta. | |
| Limenavis | Gen. nov. et Sp. nov. | Valid | Julia A. Clarke Luis M. Chiappe | Late Cretaceous | Allen Formation | Argentina | An Avialae Gauthier, 1985. The type species is Limenavis patagonica. | |
| Natunaornis | Gen. nov. et Sp. nov. | Valid | Trevor H. Worthy | Holocene | Viti Levu | Fiji | A flightless Columbidae, the type species is Natunaornis gigoura. | |
| Phoebastria rexsularum | Sp. nov. | Valid | Storrs L. Olson Pamela C. Rasmussen | Early Pliocene | Yorktown Formation | USA: North Carolina | A Diomedeidae. | |
| Pica mourerae | Sp. nov. | Valid | Bartomeu Seguí | Plio-Pleistocene | Mallorca, Balearic Islands | Spain: Mallorca | A Corvidae. | |
| Podiceps howardae | Sp. nov. | Valid | Robert W. Storer | Early Pliocene | Yorktown Formation | USA: North Carolina | A Podicipedidae, possibly a synonym of Podiceps auritus. | |
| Pseudoseisura cursor | Sp. nov. | Valid | Eduardo P. Tonni Jorge Noriega | Early Pleistocene | Ensenadan | Argentina | A Furnariidae. | |
| Pterodromoides | Gen. nov. et Sp. nov. | Valid | Bartomeu Seguí Josep Quintana Joan J. Fornos Josep A. Alcover | Late Miocene-Pliocene Early Pliocene | Menorca; Yorktown Formation, North America | Spain: Menorca; USA: North Carolina | A Procellariidae, the type species is Pterodromoides minoricensis. | |
| Rallus recessus | Sp. nov. | Valid | Storrs L. Olson David B. Wingate | Late Pleistocene | Bermuda | Bermuda | A flightless Rallidae. | |
| Wellnhoferia | Gen. nov et Sp. nov. | Valid ? | Andrei Elzanowski | Late Jura | Portlandian Solnhofer Plattenkalk | Germany: Bavaria | A new name for Archaeopteryx lithographica von Meyer, 1861, specimen No 6, the "Solnhofer specimen". The type species is Wellnhoferia grandis. | |
| Yanornis | Gen. nov. et Sp. nov. | Valid | Zhou Zhonghe Fucheng Zhang | Early Createcous | Jiufotang Formation | China | An Ornithuromorphae, the type species is Yanornis martini. | |
| Yixianornis | Gen. nov. et Sp. nov. | Valid | Zhou Zhonghe Zhang Fucheng | Early Cretaceous | Jiufotang Formation | China | An Ornithuromorphae, the type species is Yixianornis grabaui. | |

=== Newly named pterosaurs ===
| Name | Status | Authors | Age | Unit | Location | Notes | Images |
|---|---|---|---|---|---|---|---|
| Haopterus | Valid | Wang; Lü | Early Cretaceou | Yixian Formation | China | The type species is Haopterus gracilis. | |
| Istiodactylus | Valid | Howse; Milner; Martill | Early Cretaceous | Vectis Formation | United Kingdom | A new genus for Ornithodesmus latidens. | |

== Synapsids ==
=== Non-mammalian ===
| Name | Status | Authors | Age | Unit | Location | Notes | Images |
|---|---|---|---|---|---|---|---|
| Delectosaurus | Valid | Kurkin | Late Permian | Vyazniki Assemblage | Russia | A dicynodont. Two species are described Delectosaurus arefjevi and D. berezhanensis. | Lumkuia |
| Interpresosaurus | Valid | Kurkin | Late Permian | Vyazniki Assemblage | Russia | A dicynodont. The type species is Interpresosaurus blomi. | Lumkuia |
| Lumkuia | Valid | Hopson; Kitching | Middle Triassic | Burgersdorp Formation | South Africa | A cynodont. The type species is Lumkuia fuzzi. | Lumkuia |
| Malasaurus | Valid | Tatarinov | Late Triassic | Vyazniki Assemblage | Russia | A therocephalian. The type species is Malasaurus germanus. | Lumkuia |
| Mitredon | Valid | Shapiro; Jenkins | Late Triassic | Fleming Fjord Formation | Greenland | A cynodont. The type species is Mitredon cromptoni. | Lumkuia |
| Prozostrodon | Valid | Bonaparte; Barberena | Late Triassic | Santa Maria Formation | Brazil | New genus for "Thrinaxodon" brasiliensis Barberena, Bonaparte & Sá Teixeira, 1987 | Lumkuia |
| Riograndia | Valid | Bonaparte; Ferigolo; Ribeiro | Late Triassic | Caturrita Formation | Brazil | A cynodont. The type species is Riograndia guaibensis. | Lumkuia |

=== Mammalian ===
| Name | Status | Authors | Age | Unit | Location | Notes | Images |
|---|---|---|---|---|---|---|---|
| Abdounodus | Valid | Gheerbrant; Sudre | early Eocene | Ouled Abdoun Basin | Morocco | A Mioclaneid condylarth assigned to Bulbulodentata. The type species is Abdounodus hamdii. | Ocepeia |
| Ocepeia | Valid | Gheerbrant; Sudre | early Eocene | Ouled Abdoun Basin | Morocco | A condylarth assigned to Phenacodonta, later assigned to stem-Paenungulata. The type species is Ocepeia daouiensis. | Ocepeia |

== Footnotes ==
=== Complete author list ===
As science becomes more collaborative, papers with large numbers of authors are becoming more common. To prevent the deformation of the tables, these footnotes list the contributors to papers that erect new genera and have many authors.
