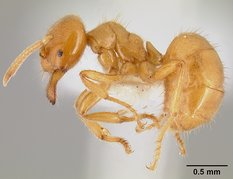
- Acropyga acutiventris worker

Scientific classification
- Kingdom: Animalia
- Phylum: Arthropoda
- Class: Insecta
- Order: Hymenoptera
- Family: Formicidae
- Subfamily: Formicinae
- Genus: Acropyga
- Species: A. acutiventris

Binomial name
- Acropyga acutiventris Roger, 1862

Subspecies
- A. acutiventris acutiventris; A. acutiventris bugnioni; A. acutiventris carinata; A. acutiventris javana; A. acutiventris rubescens

= Acropyga acutiventris =

Species of ant

Acropyga acutiventris is an ant in the subfamily Formicinae. It lives underground in tropical regions and forms a mutualistic association with the mealybug, Xenococcus annandalei.

== Description ==
This ant has the small eyes, compact body and yellowish-brown colouration typical of many ants that live underground. It can be separated from other Formicine ants found in Australia by the fact that the antennae have eleven segments, the eyes are multifaceted and clearly defined, and the first and second funicular segments are the same size.

== Distribution ==
This ant is found in rainforests in tropical regions of India, Hong Kong, Malaysia, Sarawak, Singapore, Vietnam, Papua New Guinea and parts of the Northern Territory and Queensland in Australia. In Australia it is not usually found above 300 metres and occupies a similar range to the weaver ant, Oecophylla smaragdina.

== Biology ==
This ant lives in association with the mealybug, Xenococcus annandalei in its underground nest. The mealybug is a subterranean species and sucks sap from the rootlets of certain trees, particularly species of Ficus and the coconut palm. It exudes drops of honeydew which form part of the diet of the ant. Worker ants tend the mealybugs and stimulate the production of honeydew by stroking their abdomens. If the ant colony is disturbed and the ants are forced to disperse, each takes a female mealybug to the new nest site, carrying it in her mandibles. When the soil is warm and damp, the ants and mealybugs remain just below the surface, but during cold, dry weather they descend to greater depths. This mutualistic arrangement seems to occur throughout the range of the ant.

Xenococcus annandalei has not been found anywhere except in association with A. acutiventris in its nest, and while being transported by the queen who carries a female mealybug on her nuptial flight. The colony she founds is thus provided with the food supply it needs to prosper. No other means of dispersal is known for this mealybug.
