= Goniopsarites =

Scientific classification
- Domain: Eukaryota
- Kingdom: Animalia
- Phylum: Arthropoda
- Class: Insecta
- Order: Hemiptera
- Suborder: Auchenorrhyncha
- Infraorder: Fulgoromorpha
- Family: Nogodinidae
- Subfamily: Nogodininae
- Tribe: Pisachini
- Genus: Goniopsarites; Meng Rui, Wang Meng-Lin, Wang Ying-Lun, 2014

Type species
- Goniopsarites fronticonvexus Meng, Wang & Wang, 2014

Genus of planthoppers

External image
- Image at iNaturalist

Goniopsarites is a genus of planthoppers in the tribe Pisachini in the family Nogodinidae, erected by Meng Rui, Wang Meng-Lin and Wang Ying-Lun in 2014. Species have been recorded from southern China and Vietnam.

== Species ==
Fulgoromorpha Lists on the Web includes:

1. Goniopsarites fronticonvexus Meng, Wang & Wang, 2014
2. Goniopsarites mientrunganus Constant & Pham, 2024
3. Goniopsarites tonkinensis Constant & Pham, 2016
