= Xenococcus annandalei =

Scientific classification
- Kingdom: Animalia
- Phylum: Arthropoda
- Class: Insecta
- Order: Hemiptera
- Suborder: Sternorrhyncha
- Family: Pseudococcidae
- Genus: Xenococcus
- Species: X. annandalei

Binomial name
- Xenococcus annandalei Silvestri, 1924

Species of true bug

Xenococcus annandalei is a species of mealybug in the family Pseudococcidae that infests the roots of certain species of trees.

== Description ==
The adult female X. annandalei is an elongated oval shape with an abdomen that tapers abruptly at the back. The antennae are nearly as long as the body and have four segments. There is a special means of articulation between the enlarged first and second segments so that the antennae can be folded back along the body. The back is covered in minute setae which take the place of the mealy wax found on most mealybugs. In fact there are no body wax pores. The underside has fewer longer setae. The legs are well developed and terminate in a long slender claw. The anal ring lies at the apex of the abdomen and projects beyond the ventral anal lobes. The ring has eight setae, the anterior two pairs slender and the posterior pair thick and long. There are two circuli which are round, sclerotized and slightly conical.

This is a subterranean species found in the nests of the ant Acropyga acutiventris, living on the rootlets of Ficus species. When the soil is damp and warm both ants and mealybugs are found near the surface under stones but in cold or dry weather they go much deeper into the soil. If the nest is disturbed, the ants carry away mealybugs in their mandibles.

== Host species ==
This species infests the roots of the coconut palm, Cocus nucifera, the sacred fig, Ficus religiosa, and Ficus obtusa.

== Distribution ==
This species is found in the Northern Territory of Australia, Queensland, Papua New Guinea, Hong Kong, India (Orissa), Malaysia and Vietnam.

== Biology ==
Xenococcus annandalei sucks sap from the roots of the host trees. It is attended and cared for by the ant, Acropyga acutiventris, which lives in colonies underground and has a mutualistic association with the mealybugs which live inside its nest. The excess sugar in the sap is excreted as honeydew which is removed by the ants which may stimulate its production by palpating the mealybug's abdomen. When the young ant queens leave the nest on their nuptial flight, they carry female mealybugs in their jaws ready for the foundation of new colonies. This mutualistic association is found throughout the range of the ant. Other Acropyga species have similar relationships with other species of mealybugs, and it could be a trait common to the whole genus. Fossil specimens of Acropyga have been recovered from amber deposits in the Dominican Republic and several of these are carrying Electromyrmococcus, an extinct genus of mealybug.
