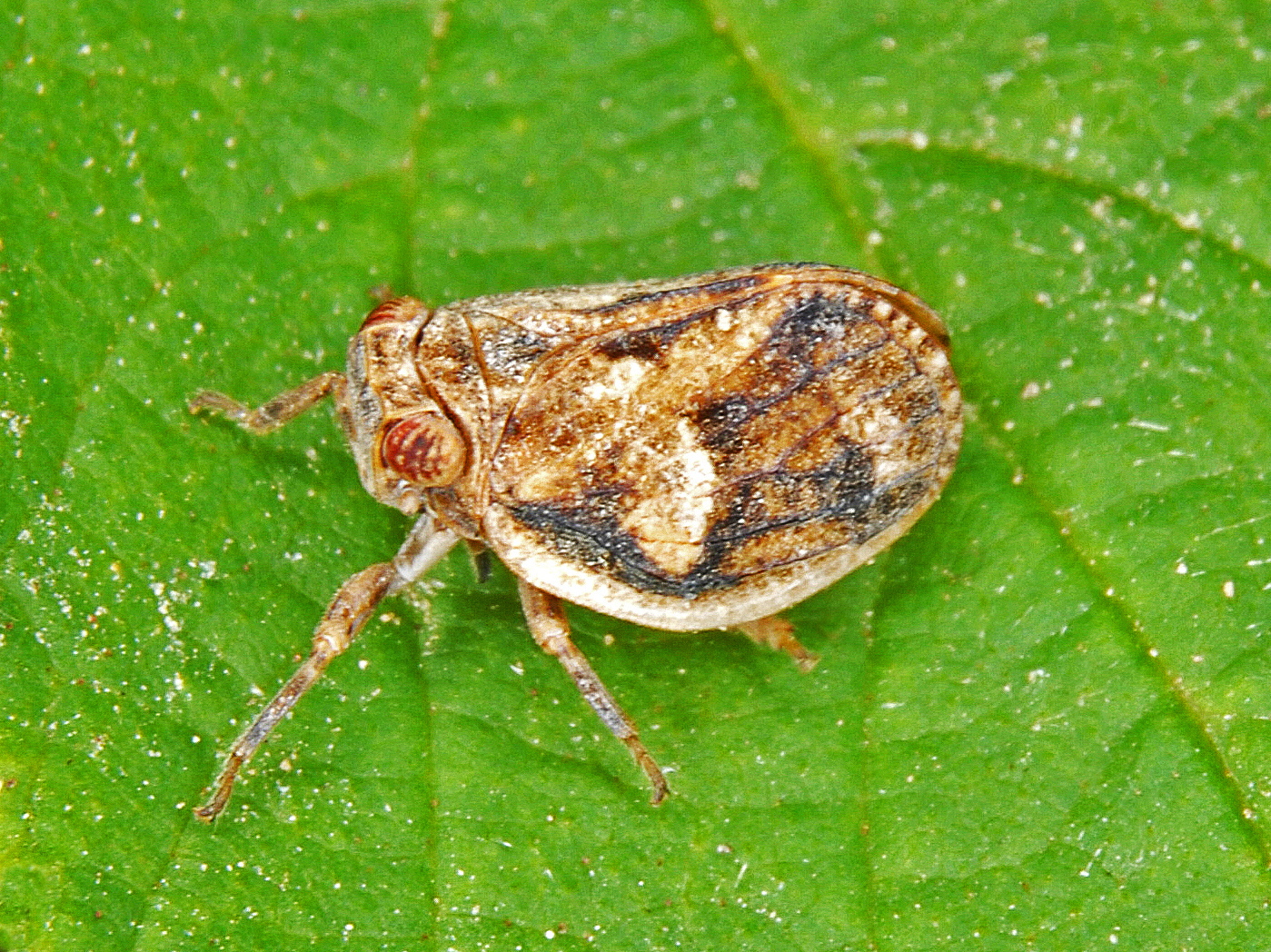

Scientific classification
- Kingdom: Animalia
- Phylum: Arthropoda
- Clade: Pancrustacea
- Class: Insecta
- Order: Hemiptera
- Suborder: Auchenorrhyncha
- Infraorder: Fulgoromorpha
- Family: Issidae
- Genus: Agalmatium
- Species: A. flavescens

Binomial name
- Agalmatium flavescens (Olivier, 1791)

Synonyms
- Cercopis grylloides Fabricius, 1794; Cercopis grylloides Fabricius, 1794; Fulgora flavescens Olivier, 1791; Hysteropterum euryproctum Kirschbaum, 1868; Hysteropterum orientale Kusnezov, 1926; Hysteropterum zelleri Kirschbaum, 1868; Issus dufourii Spinola, 1839; Issus flavescens Olivier, 1791; Issus liliimaculata O. Costa, 1834; Issus smyrnensis Spinola, 1839

= Agalmatium flavescens =

Species of true bug

Agalmatium flavescens is a species of planthopper belonging to the family Issidae, subfamily Issinae.

== Distribution ==
This species is present in Albania, Armenia, Austria, Bulgaria, France, Georgia, Greece, Hungary, Italy, Moldova, Montenegro, Portugal, Romania, Russia, Serbia, Slovenia, Spain and Turkey.

== Description ==
Agalmatium flavescens can reach a body length of approximately 4.5–5 millimetres (0.18–0.20 in) in males, of 5.3–6 millimetres (0.21–0.24 in) in females. These planthoppers are characterized by a rather variable coloration. There are light specimens with a straw coloration, and light brownish specimens, with dark brown markings. The border of the forewings is always yellowish. Apical tube in males shows apically two distinct lobes.

Like all species of the genus, the first segment of hind legs (metatarsomere) has only two intermediate spines apically. In the upper part of the forehead the horizontal transverse carinae are missing. The shape of the body is compact, the head is short and wide. Wings are rather developed, elytra are quite short. Legs are short and strong.

== Biology ==
This species is bivoltine, with two generations per year. Adults can be found from May to July and from Septembre to November.

Recorded food plants are Ficus carica, Medicago sativa, Olea europaea, Pinus species, Populus species, Prunus amygdalus and Tamarix species.

It has been reported a trophobiotic association between this planthopper species and a species of ant (Camponotus aethiops), with honeydew drops directly collected by ants from the anal openings of these issids.

== Bibliography ==
- Fabricius J. C. (1794) Ryngota, In: Fabricius J. C. 1794 - Entomologia systematica emendata et aucta. Secundum classas, ordines, genera, species adjectis synonymis, locis, observationibus, descriptionibus, 4. p. 1-57.
- Latreille P. A. (1804) Histoire naturelle, générale et particulière des Crustacés et des Insectes, 12: 424 pp.
- Olivier G. A. (1791) Fulgore, Fulgora, Encyclopedie méthodique. Histoire naturelle des animaux. Insectes, 6: 561–577.
- Spinola M. (1839) Essai sur les Fulgorelles, sous-tribu de la tribu des Cicadaires, ordre des Rhyngotes. (Suite), Annales de la Société Entomologique de France. Paris, 8: 339–454.
