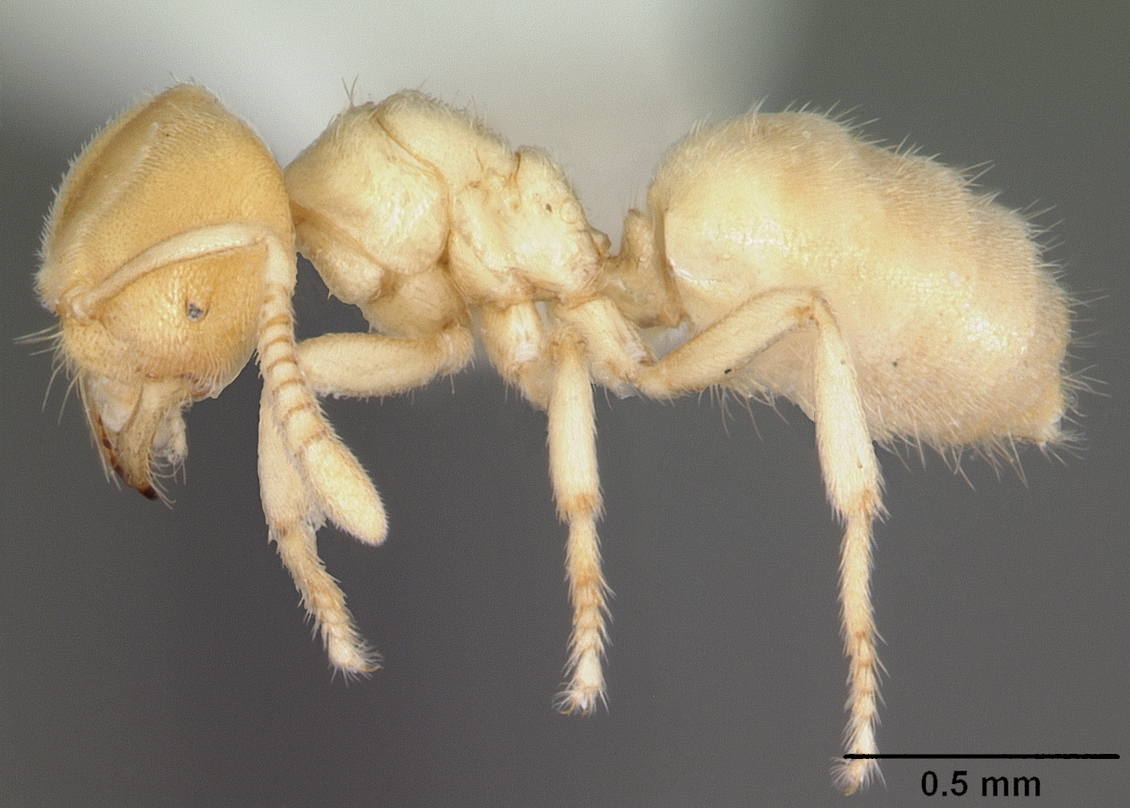
- Acropyga epedana worker

Scientific classification
- Domain: Eukaryota
- Kingdom: Animalia
- Phylum: Arthropoda
- Class: Insecta
- Order: Hymenoptera
- Family: Formicidae
- Subfamily: Formicinae
- Genus: Acropyga
- Species: A. epedana

Binomial name
- Acropyga epedana Roger, 1862

= Acropyga epedana =

Species of ant

Acropyga epedana is an ant in the subfamily Formicinae. It lives permanently underground in the Chiricahua Mountains in Arizona and forms a mutualistic association with the mealybug Rhizoecus colombiensis.

== Description ==
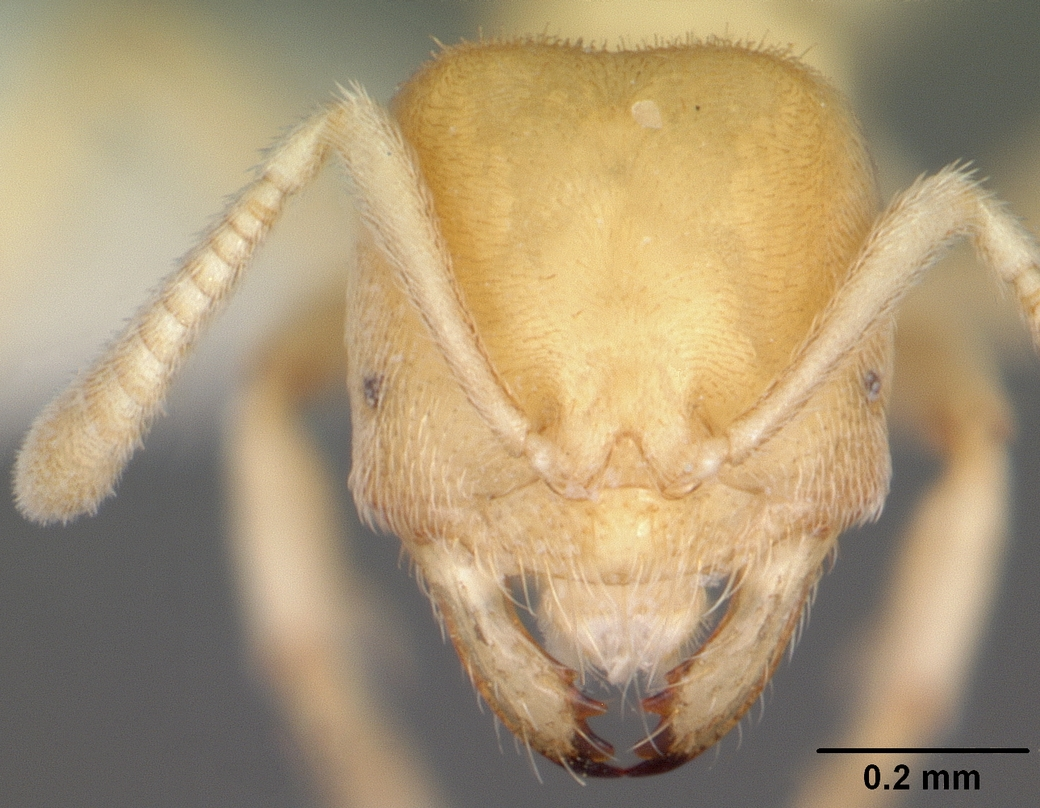
Head of worker

Acropyga epedana is a tiny pale golden-brown ant with a few erect hairs but many dense appressed hairs. The reproductives have normal compound eyes but the workers have tiny eyes and avoid exposure to light. These ants are very similar in appearance to Acropyga goeldii and Acropyga palaga and may be a northern population of A. goeldi. However, there are differences in the extensions to the penis valves that make it likely that the three are in fact separate species. The head of Acropyga epedana is smaller than that of the other two species. The total length of a worker is 1.75 mm (0.07 in).

== Distribution ==
Acropyga epedana is found in the Chiricahua Mountains in Arizona at elevations of between 1,050 and 1,700 metres (3,440 and 5,580 ft) and its range probably extends southwards into the Sierra Madre Occidental Mountains in Mexico. Because there is no sign of the nest above ground, this ant may be under recorded. It is generally found in woodland of juniper and oak.

== Biology ==
Colonies of Acropyga epedana are completely subterranean. Nests have been found under boulders and consist of galleries and chambers that may extend to 30 centimetres (12 in) or more underground, and perhaps deeper in the dry season. This species has an obligate trophobiotic relationship with the mealybug, Rhizoecus colombiensis. This underground sap-sucking insect feeds on the roots of plants and the ants herd them and feed on the honeydew they produce. The ants are believed to obtain all their nourishment from this source, and in a laboratory experiment, when they were deprived of their mealybugs, they refused all other forms of food that they were offered. The mealybugs are found clustered on roots in deeper parts of the nest in the passages excavated by the ants. Many of the ants are infested with parasitic mites.

Flights of winged reproductive ants (alates) have been seen in mid-summer, shortly after the beginning of seasonal rains. There are often ten times as many male as female alates. Each female emerges from her natal nest carrying a mealybug between her mandibles, presumably to act as a parent of the mealybug herd in the nest she will found. The flying ants hover in a swarm and copulate in mid-air. The females return to the ground after their nuptial flights, each still carrying a mealybug, shed their wings, and search for a suitable site to make a new nest. Some may join colonies in existing nests, as evidenced by the fact that there are often several queens in a nest.
