= Trophobiosis =

Type of symbiotic association in ecology

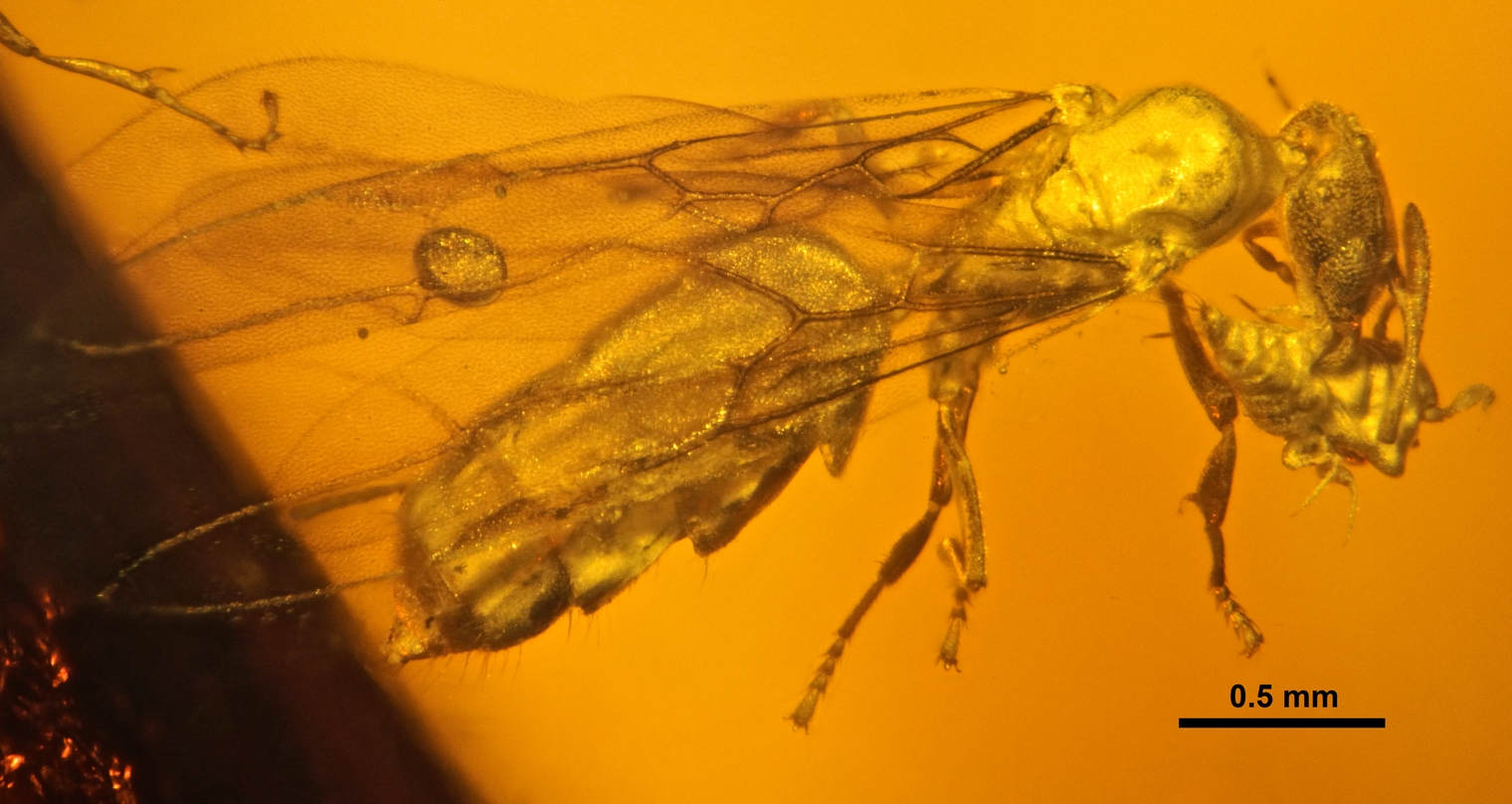
Acropyga glaesaria and Electromyrmococcus abductus

Trophobiosis is a symbiotic association between organisms where food is obtained or provided. The provider of food in the association is referred to as a trophobiont. The name is derived from the Ancient Greek τροφή (trophē), meaning "nourishment", and -βίωσις (-biosis), which is short for the English word symbiosis.

Among the more noted trophobiotic groups are ants and members of a number of hemipteran families. A number of ant genera are recorded as tending groups of hemipterans to varying degrees. In most cases the ants collect and transport the honeydew secretions from the hemipterans back to the nest for consumption. Not all examples of ant trophobiotic interactions are mutualistic, with instances such as ants attracted to Cacopsylla pyricola feeding on both the honeydew and the C. pyricola individuals. This interaction has been recorded in Ancient Chinese writings and is noted as one of the oldest instances of biological pest control.

In mutualistic relationships, the production of honeydew by trophobionts is rewarded by removal of dead hemipterans and protection from a variety of predators by the attendant ants. In some relationships the ants will build shelters for the farmed trophobionts, either to protect them or keep them from leaving the area. Some species of ants construct underground rooms to house the trophobionts and carry them between the host plant and housing area daily. In more complex obligate relationships (where both symbionts entirely depend on each other for survival) the ants will nest with the partner trophobionts in silk constructed leaf shelters or in underground colonies. Several species of migratory ants are noted to bring the trophobiont species with them when they move, transporting the trophobionts to new feeding areas and acting as a quick escape method if danger arises. While aphids, mealybugs and other more sedentary hemipterans are most often used as trophobionts, occasional instances of more active hemipterans such as leafhoppers have been recorded. In such instances in southern Africa, larger ant genera such as Camponotus are more successful at herding and containment of the leafhoppers. Smaller ant genera have been observed to tend younger or smaller leafhoppers for short periods, and in some cases, small ant genera were observed visiting herds tended by large ant genera. In these cases it is suggested the small ant genera may have been stealing honeydew droplets from the herd.

Ants of the entirely subterranean genus Acropyga have a noted trophobiotic relationship with mealybugs, being considered obligate coccidophiles and living in the same nests with their trophobionts. Queens of at least eleven living Acropyga species have been observed carrying a "seed" trophobiont in their mandibles during the mating flight, and it is suggested the seed is then used to start the mealybug colony in the queen's new nest. The level of dependency between Acropyga and their trophobiont is suggested to be such that neither can survive without the other. An experiment using a captive colony of A. epedana showed that even when the colony was starved the ant refused offered food alternatives.

This specific behavior has also been documented in Dominican amber fossils dating back 15 million years ago, with queens of the fossil species Acropyga glaesaria being found preserved with species of the extinct mealybug genus Electromyrmococcus. Older trophobiotic associations have been suggested for the Eocene fossil ant species Ctenobethylus goepperti based on a Baltic amber fossil entombing thirteen C. goepperti workers intermingled with a number of aphids. Convergent behavior to that of Acropyga is displayed by the arboreal ant Tetraponera binghami. This species lives in hollow internodes of giant bamboos and new queens will also carry a seed mealybug during the mating flight.

== See also ==
- Ant–fungus mutualism
- Trophallaxis
