= Acropyga exsanguis =

Scientific classification
- Kingdom: Animalia
- Phylum: Arthropoda
- Clade: Pancrustacea
- Class: Insecta
- Order: Hymenoptera
- Family: Formicidae
- Subfamily: Formicinae
- Genus: Acropyga
- Species: A. exsanguis

Binomial name
- Acropyga exsanguis (W. M. Wheeler, 1909)

Synonyms
- Acropyga bruchi Santschi, 1929; Acropyga paramaribensis Borgmeier, 1933; Acropyga robae Donisthorpe, 1936; Acropyga wheeleri Mann, 1922

Species of ant

Acropyga exsanguis is a species of ant in the subfamily Formicinae. It lives in underground nests in Mexico, Central and South America.

== Description ==
Over 450 ant species have been collected at La Selva Biological Station in Costa Rica, including several species of Acropyga. These are small, stocky ants less than 3.5 mm (0.14 in) long, and A. exsanguis is not easy to distinguish from related species. The dorsal surface is rather more densely covered in short hairs than is the case with Acropyga keira, another species found at La Selva.

== Distribution and habitat ==
This neotropical ant is known from Mexico, Guatemala, El Salvador, Honduras, Nicaragua, Costa Rica, Panama, Colombia, Venezuela and Argentina. It occurs at altitudes up to about 1,660 m (5,400 ft), typical habitats including wet or moist lowland rainforest, mesophyll forest and montane wet forest. It lives in colonies underground and this subterranean existence means it is poorly represented in ant surveys; it has been found most often by sifting through leaf litter, but has occasionally been observed under stones or visiting bait. The fact that it is much more common than might be expected from survey results is shown by the vast swarms of males that were seen twice in 1991 at La Selva Biological Station during the wet season.

== Ecology ==
This ant lives underground in a large, diffuse nest. The ants move the nest upwards and downwards according to the conditions of the soil, descending deeper when the ground becomes dry. The nests have multiple queens, either because they were founded by several newly-mated reproductives, or because they have recruited further queens since their foundation.

This ant lives in symbiosis with several species of mealybug which live in its nest; the mealybugs suck sap from roots, and the ants feed on the honeydew that the mealybugs secrete. Species of mealybug found in the nest include Geococcus coffeae, Rhizoecus coffeae, Pseudorhizoecus proximus, Rhizoecus caladii, and Rhizoecus falcifer, and on several occasions, queen ants have been observed setting off on their nuptial flight carrying a fertilised female mealybug.
