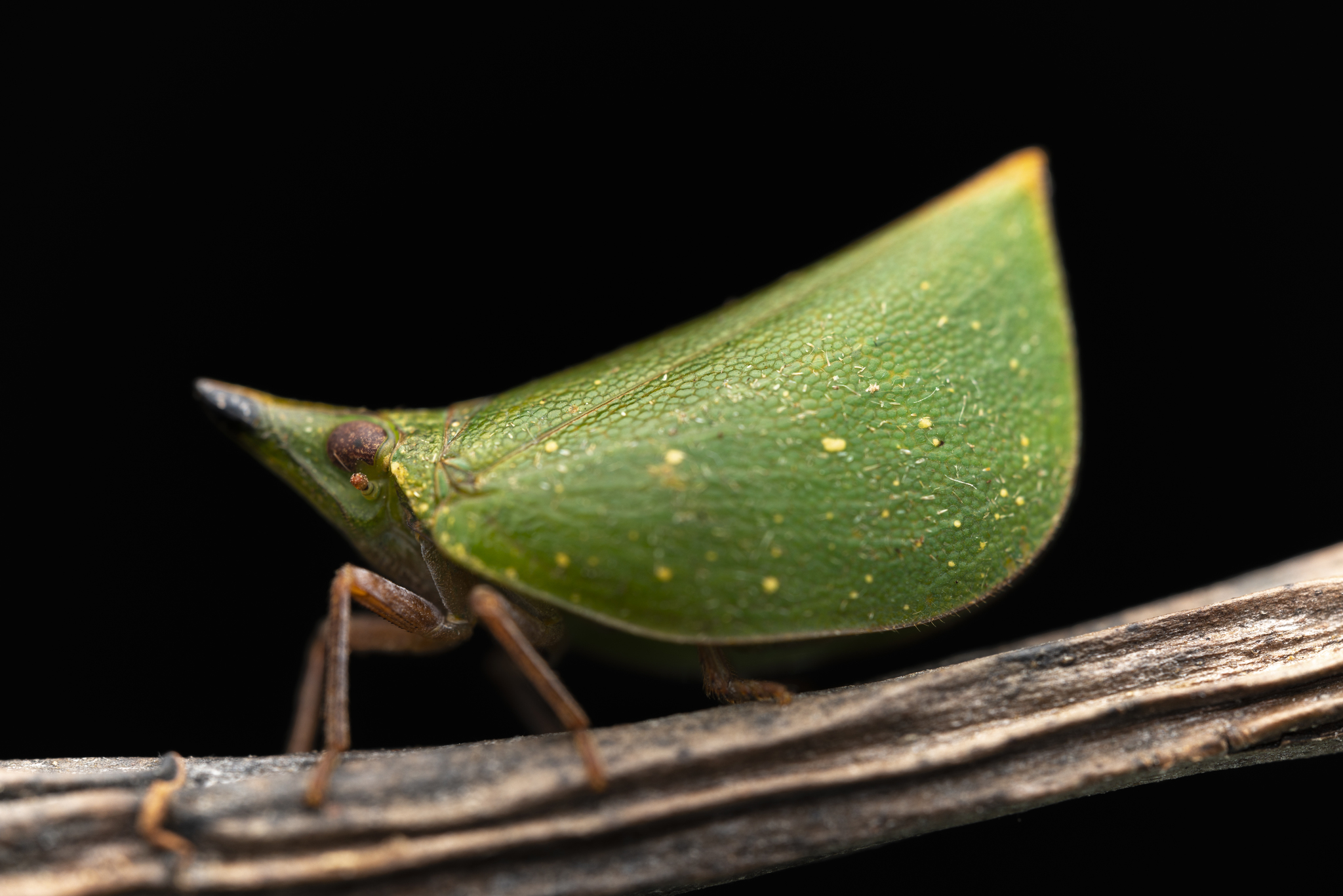

Scientific classification
- Kingdom: Animalia
- Phylum: Arthropoda
- Clade: Pancrustacea
- Class: Insecta
- Order: Hemiptera
- Suborder: Auchenorrhyncha
- Infraorder: Fulgoromorpha
- Family: Nogodinidae
- Subfamily: Nogodininae
- Genus: Tonga; Kirkaldy, 1900

= Tonga (insect) =

Genus of insects

Tonga is a genus of tropical planthoppers, found throughout Asia and Oceania, including in China, Taiwan, Indonesia, Japan, Myanmar, Vietnam, New Guinea, and the Philippines. Originally named Cyrene by the English entomologist John O. Westwood, the genus would later be revised into Tonga by the entomologist George Willis Kirkaldy in his 1900 article Bibliographical and nomenclatorial notes on Rhynchota No. 1.

== Species ==
The following species are recognised in the genus Tonga:

- Tonga acutipennis Haupt, 1926
- Tonga baingensis (Lallemand & Synave, 1953)
- Tonga bipunctata Schmidt, 1910
- Tonga botelensis Kato, 1934
- Tonga brunnea Schmidt, 1910
- Tonga foliacea (Stål, 1859)
- Tonga formosana Matsumura, 1913
- Tonga guttulata (Westwood, 1845) - type species
- Tonga hageni Schmidt, 1910
- Tonga inermis (Stål, 1870)
- Tonga irregulata Haupt, 1926
- Tonga mucronata (Stål, 1870)
- Tonga semipolita Haupt, 1926
- Tonga telifera (Walker, 1870)
- Tonga truncata Schmidt, 1910
- Tonga unipunctata Schmidt, 1910
- Tonga westwoodi (Signoret, 1862)
- Tonga yayeyamana Matsumura, 1916
