= Anthony Patrick Russell =

Canadian paleontologist (born 1947)

- Born: 1947 (age 78–79)
- Education: University of Exeter (BSc); University of London (PhD)
- Known for: Research on the evolutionary and functional morphology of living and extinct amniote vertebrates
- Scientific career
- Fields: Paleontology; Comparative anatomy; Vertebrate morphology
- Workplaces: University of Calgary
- Thesis: (1972)

Anthony Patrick Russell, also written as Anthony Russell, (born 1947) is a Canadian paleontologist.

== Biography ==
Russell received a BSc in Zoology and Botany from the University of Exeter in 1969 and a PhD in Comparative Anatomy from the University of London in 1972. His research focuses on the evolutionary and functional morphology of living and extinct amniote vertebrates, with particular interests in the locomotor system of gekkonid lizards, systematics and historical biogeography, and the mechanics and evolution of vertebrate feeding systems. He has also conducted research on the biology and ecology of amphibians and reptiles in Alberta, as well as on Cretaceous vertebrates of western North America in collaboration with the Royal Tyrrell Museum of Palaeontology.

Russell worked at the University of Calgary in the Department of Biology.

== Taxonomy ==
Fossils/Taxa described:

- Coronosaurus brinkmani
- Gekko browni
- Gigarcanum delcourti
- Hoplodactylus delcourti
- Luperosaurus browni
- Nichollssaura
- Thecadactylus solimoensis
- Wapuskanectes

== Selected publications ==
- Bergmann & Russell (2007), Systematics and biogeography of the widespread Neotropical gekkonid genus Thecadactylus (Squamata), with the description of a new cryptic species, Zoological Journal of the Linnean Society, 149(3): 339–370.
- Hillary C. Maddin, Anthony Patrick Russell & Jason S. Anderson (2012), Phylogenetic implications of the morphology of the braincase of caecilian amphibians (Gymnophiona), Zoological Journal of the Linnean Society, 166(1): 160–201. doi:10.1111/j.1096-3642.2012.00838.x
