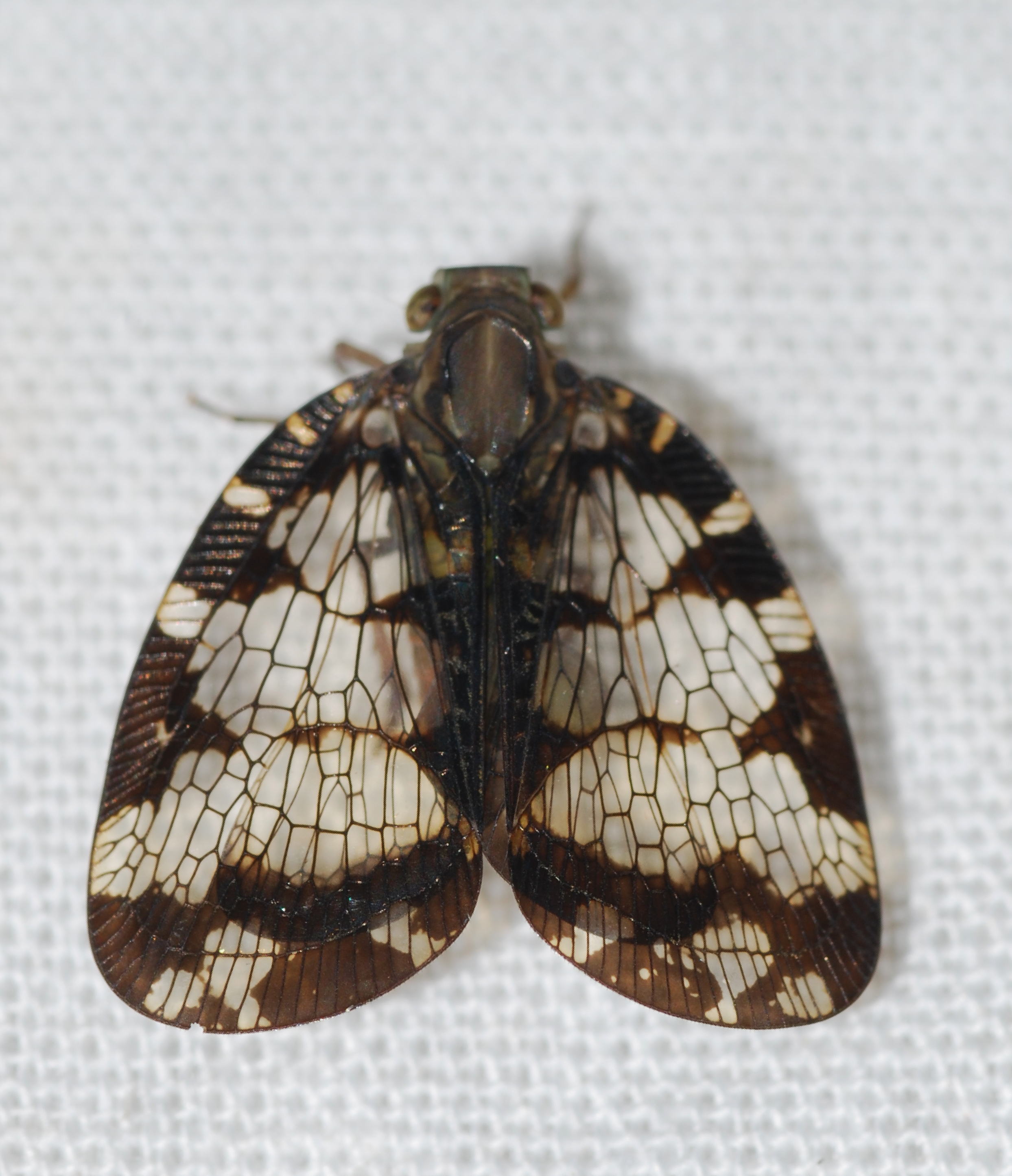
- Nogodina reticulata

Scientific classification
- Domain: Eukaryota
- Kingdom: Animalia
- Phylum: Arthropoda
- Class: Insecta
- Order: Hemiptera
- Suborder: Auchenorrhyncha
- Infraorder: Fulgoromorpha
- Superfamily: Fulgoroidea
- Family: Nogodinidae
- Subfamily: Nogodininae; Melichar, 1898

= Nogodininae =

Subfamily of true bugs

The Nogodininae are a sub-family of tropical planthoppers erected by Leopold Melichar in 1898. The recorded distribution is: South America, Africa and the Middle East, South and SE Asia through to Australia.

== Tribes and Genera ==
Fulgoromorpha Lists On the Web lists 8 tribes:

Bilbiliini Gnezdilov, 2017

1. Bilbilis Stål, 1861 - Australia

=== Epacriini ===
Auth. Gerstaecker, 1895 - Africa & Middle East

1. Afronias Fennah, 1967
2. Colpocara Bergroth, 1920
3. Criopaca Schmidt, 1918
4. Diazanus Hesse, 1925
5. Epacria (insect) Gerstaecker, 1895
6. Gamergomimus Fennah, 1984
7. Kiomonia Schmidt, 1911
8. Mangola (insect) Melichar, 1906
9. Mikewilsonia Holzinger, 2019
10. Monteira Melichar, 1906
11. Morsina Melichar, 1902
12. Paramangola Synave, 1956
13. Philbyella China, 1938
14. Privesomorphus Schmidt, 1912
15. Psiadiicola Fennah, 1978

=== Lipocalliini ===
Auth. Fennah, 1984 - Australia

1. Bilbilicallia Jacobi, 1928
2. Lipocallia Kirkaldy, 1906

=== Mithymnini ===
Aurh. Fennah, 1967 - southern Africa

1. Bowesdorpia Synave, 1956
2. Colmadona Kirkaldy, 1901
3. Fovealvus Gnezdilov & Wilson, 2007
4. Mithymna (insect) Stål, 1861
5. Paralusanda Synave, 1956
6. Stilpnochlaena Fennah, 1967
7. Telmessodes Fennah, 1967
8. Telmosias Fennah, 1967
9. Xosias Kirkaldy, 1904

=== Nogodinini ===
Auth. Melichar, 1898 - South America

- subtribe Nogodinina Melichar, 1898
1. Biolleyana Distant, 1909
2. Neovarcia Schmidt, 1919
3. Nogodina Stål, 1859
4. Orthothyreus Schmidt, 1919
5. Varciopsis Jacobi, 1916
- subtribe Vutinina Fennah, 1978
1. Vutina Stål, 1862

=== Pisachini ===
Auth. Fennah, 1978 - Japan to SE Asia

1. Goniopsara Metcalf, 1952 - monotypic: G. (as Goniopsis) mystica Melichar, 1899 from Sumatra
2. Goniopsarites Meng, Wang & Wang, 2014
3. Pisacha Distant, 1906

=== Tongini ===
Auth. Kirkaldy, 1907 - Madagascar, S & SE Asia to Australia

1. Andrewsiella Izzard, 1936
2. Atylana Melichar, 1906
3. Capelopterum Melichar, 1906
4. Chondroptera Bergroth, 1910
5. Cotylana Fennah, 1954
6. Distiana Metcalf, 1952
7. Epitonga Fennah, 1954
8. Forculus (insect) Distant, 1912
9. Forculusoides Distant, 1916
10. Glyphotonga Schmidt, 1910
11. Hemitonga Schmidt, 1911
12. Lollius (insect) Stål, 1866
13. Neolollius Muir, 1921
14. Orthophana Melichar, 1923
15. Oryxana Distant, 1910
16. Paratonga Schmidt, 1910
17. Paratylana Melichar, 1906
18. Pseudotylana Melichar, 1906
19. Scalabis (insect) Stål, 1870
20. Tonga (insect) Kirkaldy, 1900
21. Tylana Stål, 1861

=== Varciini ===
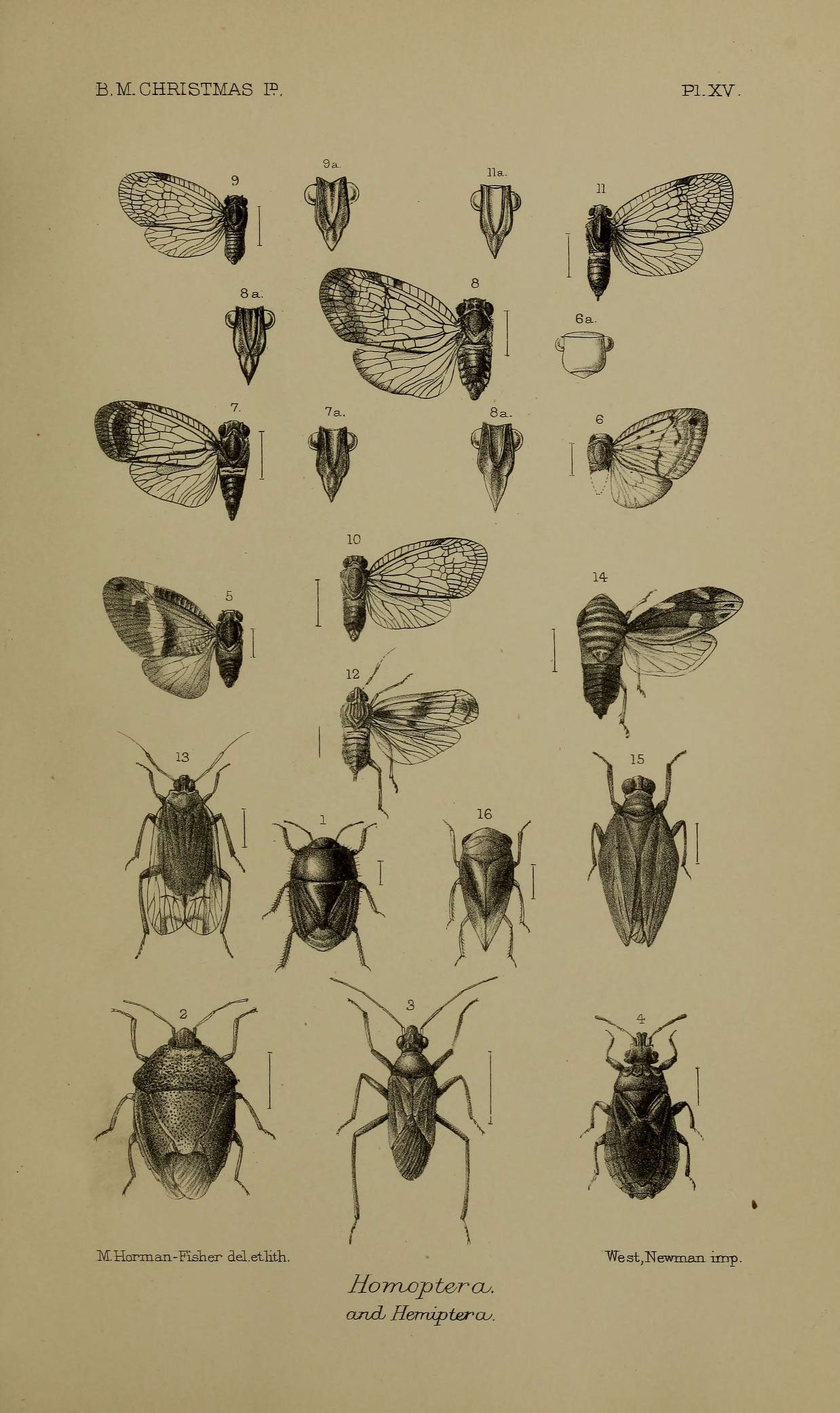
Includes illustrations of Nogodina and Sassula

Auth. Fennah, 1978 - South & SE Asia to Australia

- subtribe Sassulina Fennah, 1978
1. Aphanophrys Melichar, 1898
2. Decoomana Lallemand, 1942
3. Mindura Stål, 1862
4. Paradetya Schmidt, 1919
5. Sassula Stål, 1870
- subtribe Varciina Fennah, 1978
1. Convarcia Schmidt, 1919
2. Detya Distant, 1906
3. Miriza Stål, 1862
4. Paravarcia Schmidt, 1919
5. Probletomus Gerstaecker, 1895
6. Varcia Stål, 1870
7. Varciella Melichar, 1923

=== Extinct genera ===
Includes:

- †Tainosia Szwedo & Stroiński, 2001
- †Tonocatecutlius
