= Geococcus coffeae =

Scientific classification
- Domain: Eukaryota
- Kingdom: Animalia
- Phylum: Arthropoda
- Class: Insecta
- Order: Hemiptera
- Suborder: Sternorrhyncha
- Family: Pseudococcidae
- Genus: Geococcus
- Species: G. coffeae

Binomial name
- Geococcus coffeae Green, 1933

Species of true bug

Geococcus coffeae is a species in the mealybug family, Pseudococcidae, commonly known as the coffee root mealybug, or brown scale. It lives underground where it inserts its mouthparts into roots and sucks the sap.

== Description ==
The adult female mealybug is an elongated oval shape, and grows to a length of 2 to 2.5 mm (0.08 to 0.10 in). It is pure white except for the reddish-brown anal lobes, which are tipped by prominent blunt hooks. A smaller pair of chitinized hooks is located centrally on the last abdominal segment.

== Distribution ==
Geococcus coffeae was first described by the British mycologist and entomologist Edward Ernest Green, growing on the roots of the coffee plant, Coffea liberica, in Suriname. It is also known from Cuba, Costa Rica, Honduras, Dominican Republic, Panama, Guatemala, Colombia and Brazil, Ghana, Nigeria, Uganda and Zanzibar, India, the Philippines and Hawaii. It was first detected in Florida in 1958, growing on ornamental pot plants, Dieffenbachia and Philodendron bipinnatifidum, and efforts were made to restrict its spread.

== Ecology ==
Geococcus coffeae infests the roots of a number of different plant species including grasses, coffee, mango, palms, citrus, Cyperus, pineapple and Syngonium. Living underground, these mealybugs often go undetected. Examination of the root systems of plants in pots may reveal quantities of the wax that the insects secrete. On coffee, this mealybug prefers the smaller absorbent roots of the plant while other species such as Dysmicoccus brevipes and Rhizoecus nemoralis colonise the larger roots. The eggs are laid in groups and covered with waxy material. On hatching, the nymphs move a short way before piercing the roots with their mouthparts and starting to feed. The colony of mealybugs exude wax and secrete honeydew, forming a darkish, cork-like crust, and where there are several colonies, give a knobbly appearance to the root.

This mealybug often lives in symbiosis with the ant Acropyga exsanguis, being carried into the ant nest and tended by the ants. The mealybugs secrete the excess fluid they ingest as "honeydew" on which the ants feed.
