= Acropyga rubescens =

Scientific classification
- Kingdom: Animalia
- Phylum: Arthropoda
- Clade: Pancrustacea
- Class: Insecta
- Order: Hymenoptera
- Family: Formicidae
- Subfamily: Formicinae
- Genus: Acropyga
- Species: A. rubescens

Binomial name
- Acropyga rubescens Forel, 1894

Species of ant

Acropyga rubescens is an ant in the Formicinae subfamily.
