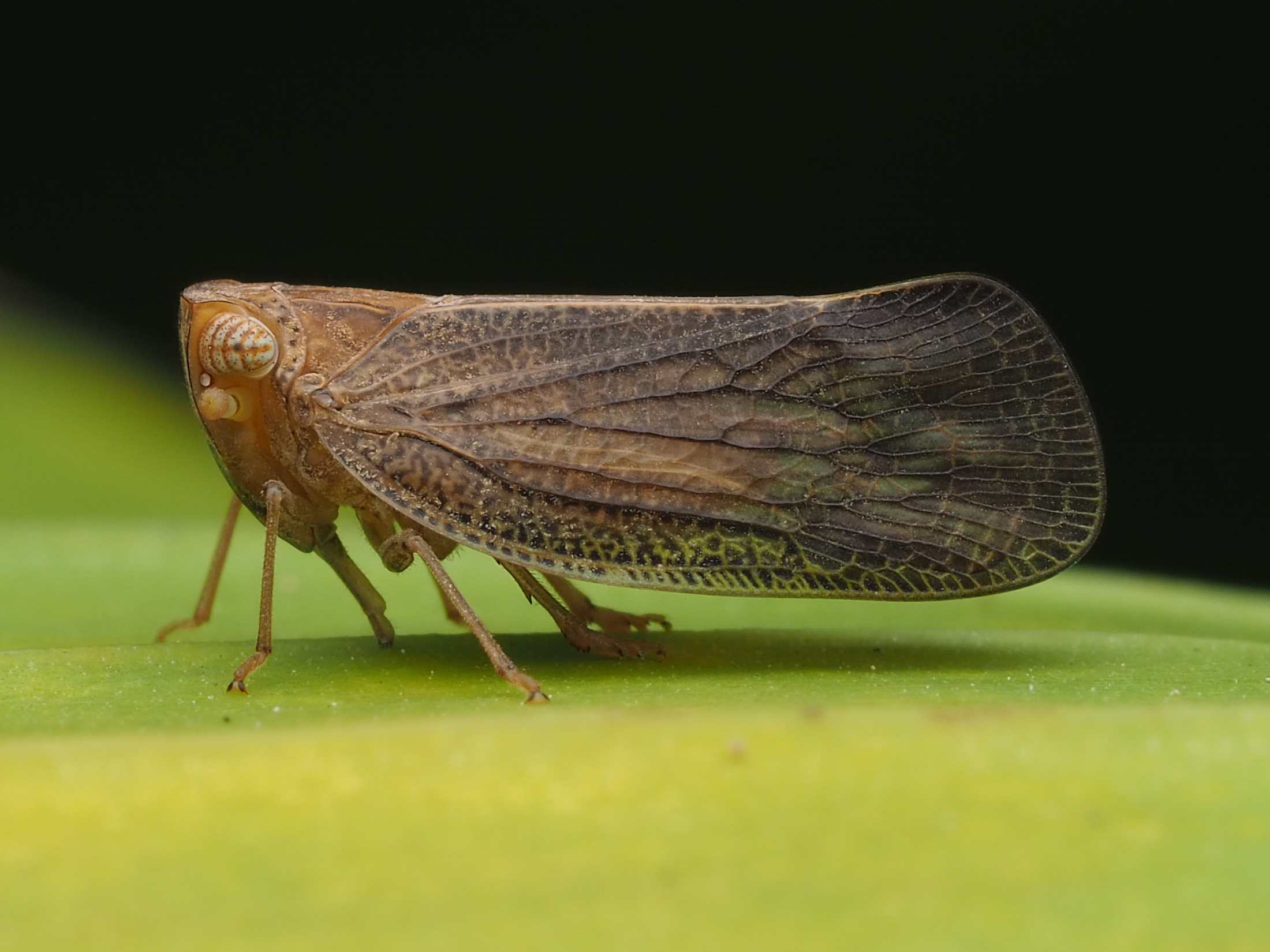
- Bladina sp. from Belize

Scientific classification
- Kingdom: Animalia
- Phylum: Arthropoda
- Clade: Pancrustacea
- Class: Insecta
- Order: Hemiptera
- Suborder: Auchenorrhyncha
- Infraorder: Fulgoromorpha
- Family: Nogodinidae
- Subfamily: Bladininae
- Genus: Bladina; Stål, 1859

Type species
- Bladina fuscovenosa Stål, 1859

= Bladina =

Genus of insects

Bladina is a genus of planthoppers found in North and South America.

== Taxonomy ==
As of 2022, Bladina contains the following species:

- Bladina anser Kramer, 1976
- Bladina bispinata Kramer, 1976
- Bladina dlabolai Kramer, 1976
- Bladina fowleri Fennah, 1952
- Bladina fraterna Stål, 1862
- Bladina fuscovenosa Stål, 1859
- Bladina gatunensis Kramer, 1976
- Bladina lacydes Fennah, 1952
- Bladina loisae Kramer, 1976
- Bladina magnifrons (Walker, 1858)
- Bladina malaisei Fennah, 1952
- Bladina mimica Fennah, 1952
- Bladina molorchus Fennah, 1952
- Bladina osborni Melichar, 1898
- Bladina pallidinervis Fennah, 1952
- Bladina rudis (Walker, 1851)
- Bladina subovata Kramer, 1976
- Bladina synavei Kramer, 1976
- Bladina vexans Kramer, 1976
