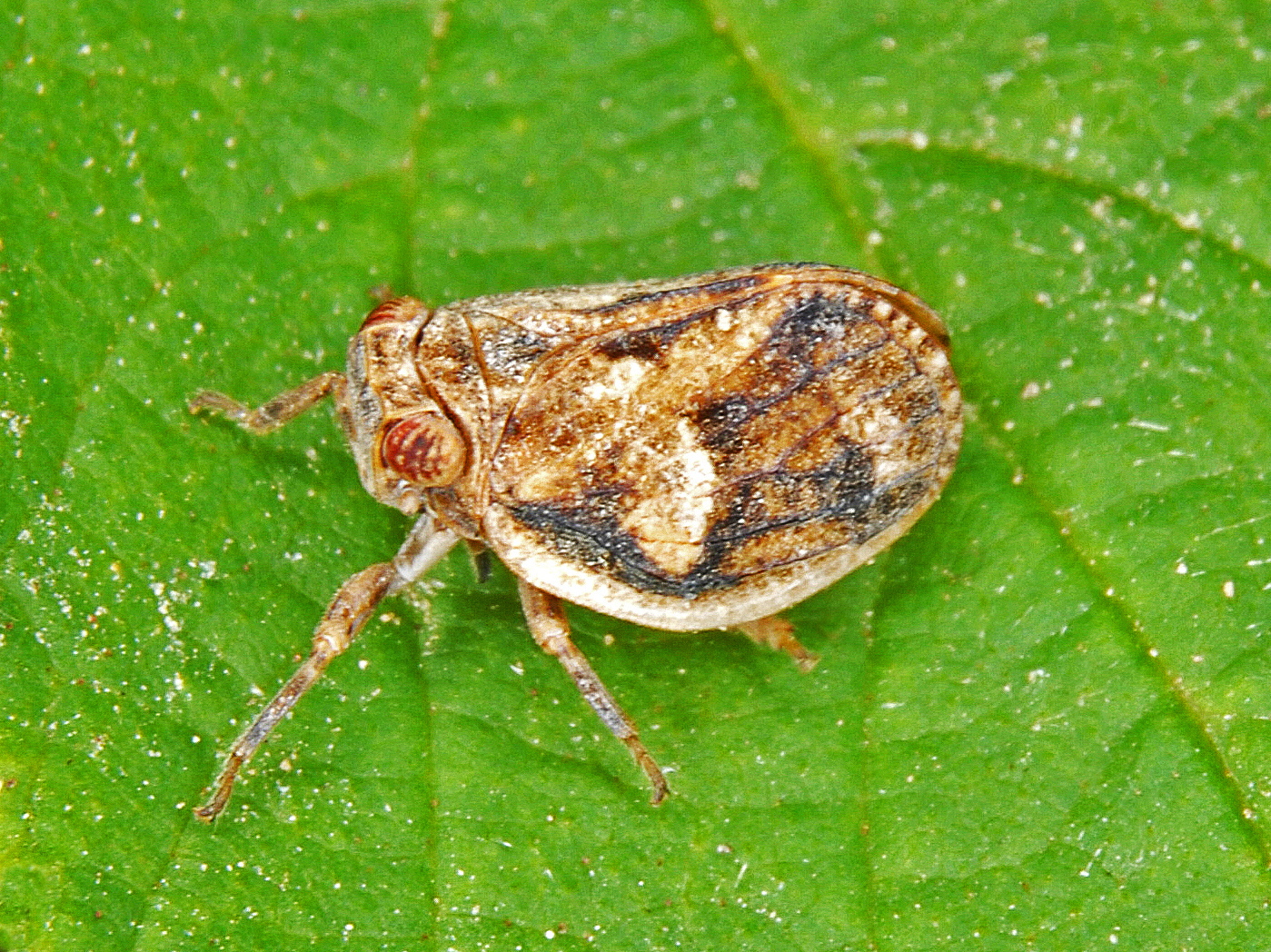
- Agalmatium flavescens

Scientific classification
- Domain: Eukaryota
- Kingdom: Animalia
- Phylum: Arthropoda
- Class: Insecta
- Order: Hemiptera
- Suborder: Auchenorrhyncha
- Infraorder: Fulgoromorpha
- Family: Issidae
- Subfamily: Hysteropterinae
- Tribe: Hysteropterini
- Genus: Agalmatium; Emeljanov, 1971

= Agalmatium =

Genus of true bugs

Agalmatium is a genus of planthoppers belonging to the family Issidae, subfamily Hysteropterinae.

== Species ==
Species within this genus include:

- Agalmatium abruptum (Bergevin, 1920)
- Agalmatium bilobum (Fieber, 1877)
- Agalmatium corsicum Dlabola, 1982
- Agalmatium costale (Matsumura, 1910)
- Agalmatium curtulum (Melichar, 1906)
- Agalmatium flavescens (Olivier, 1791)
- Agalmatium melanophleps (Fieber, 1877)

== Distribution ==
These species are distributed in the Mediterranean, from Portugal, Morocco and Tunisia to Israel, the Crimea and the Caucasus. One species - Agalmatium bilobum – has been introduced in California (USA).

== Description ==
These planthoppers are characterized by the first segment of hind legs (metatarsomere) with only two intermediate spines apically. In the upper part of the forehead the horizontal transverse carinae are missing. The shape of the body is compact, the head is short and wide. Wings are rather developed, elytra are quite short. Legs are short and strong.
