= Acropyga =

Acropyga Temporal range: Burdigalian to Recent
- A. berwicki worker

Scientific classification
- Domain: Eukaryota
- Kingdom: Animalia
- Phylum: Arthropoda
- Class: Insecta
- Order: Hymenoptera
- Family: Formicidae
- Subfamily: Formicinae
- Tribe: Plagiolepidini
- Genus: Acropyga; Roger, 1862

Type species
- Acropyga acutiventris Roger, 186

Diversity
- 42 species

Synonyms
- Atopodon Forel, 1912; Malacomyrma Emery, 1922; Rhizomyrma Forel, 1893

Genus of ants

Acropyga is a genus of small formicine ants. Some species can be indirect pests. A. acutiventris, which is found from India to Australia, tends subterranean, root-feeding mealybugs of the species Xenococcus annandalei. Living, gravid females are carried in the jaws of A. acutiventris queens during their nuptial flight, to establish the symbiotic association in founding colonies. Other Acropyga species have relationships with different species of mealybugs, and it could be a trait common to the whole genus.

== Description ==
Acropyga are smaller than 3.5 millimetres (0.14 in), with a compact, stocky body. They have antennae with 10 or 11 segments (including the scape), short palps and reduced eyes with four to 30 individual ommatidia. In some species, the eyes are completely absent.

== Distribution ==
Acropyga is found in the Americas, southern Africa, India to Southeast Asia and Australia. A. paleartica is known only from Greece. Fossil specimens of Acropyga have been recovered from the Burdigalian stage. Dominican amber deposits and several individuals are preserved carrying Electromyrmococcus mealybugs. These fossils represent the oldest recorded record of the symbiosis between mealybugs and Acropyga species ants. They are found in leaf litter and forage on low vegetation, and will nest in various sites, including soil, bark and rotten logs.

== Species ==
- Acropyga acutiventris Roger, 1862
- Acropyga ambigua Emery, 1922
- Acropyga arnoldi Santschi, 1926
- Acropyga ayanganna LaPolla, 2004
- Acropyga bakwele LaPolla & Fisher, 2005
- Acropyga butteli Forel, 1912
- Acropyga decedens (Mayr, 1887)
- Acropyga donisthorpei Weber, 1944
- Acropyga dubia Karavaiev, 1933
- Acropyga dubitata (Wheeler & Mann, 1914)
- Acropyga epedana Snelling, 1973
- Acropyga exsanguis (Wheeler, 1909)
- Acropyga fuhrmanni (Forel, 1914)
- Acropyga gelasis LaPolla, 2004
- †Acropyga glaesaria LaPolla, 2005
- Acropyga goeldii Forel, 1893
- Acropyga guianensis Weber, 1944
- Acropyga hirsutula LaPolla, 2004
- Acropyga hystrix LaPolla, 2004
- Acropyga indosinensis Wheeler, 1935
- Acropyga inezae Forel, 1912
- Acropyga keira LaPolla, 2004
- Acropyga kinomurai Terayama & Hashimoto, 1996
- Acropyga lauta Mann, 1919
- Acropyga major Donisthorpe, 1949
- Acropyga myops Forel, 1910
- Acropyga nipponensis Terayama, 1985
- Acropyga oceanica Emery, 1900
- Acropyga palaga LaPolla, 2004
- Acropyga paleartica Menozzi, 1936
- Acropyga pallida (Donisthorpe, 1938)
- Acropyga panamensis Weber, 1944
- Acropyga parvidens (Wheeler & Mann, 1914)
- Acropyga romeo LaPolla, 2004
- Acropyga rubescens Forel, 1894
- Acropyga sauteri Forel, 1912
- Acropyga silvestrii Emery, 1915
- Acropyga smithii Forel, 1893
- Acropyga stenotes LaPolla, 2004
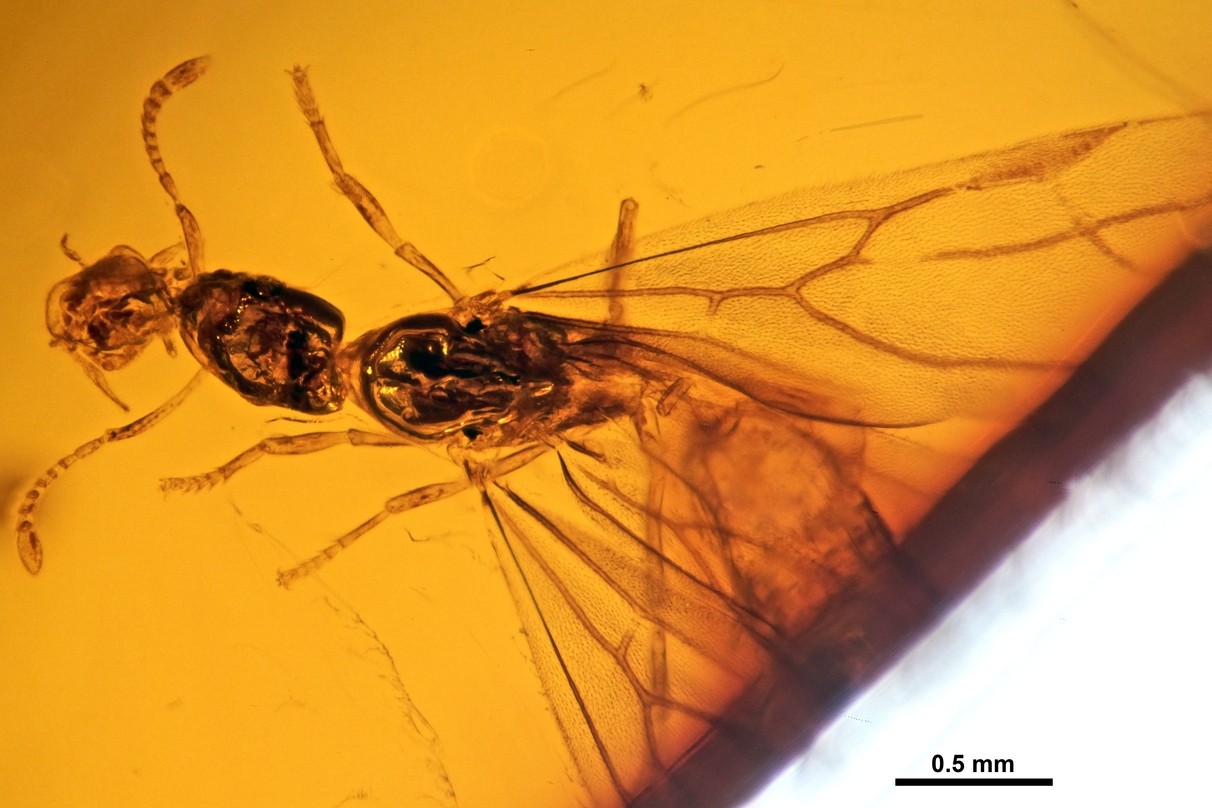
  Acropyga glaesaria in amber
- Acropyga tricuspis LaPolla, 2004
- Acropyga yaeyamensis Terayama & Hashimoto, 1996
- Acropyga yushi Terayama, 2009
