= Pisacha =

Scientific classification
- Domain: Eukaryota
- Kingdom: Animalia
- Phylum: Arthropoda
- Class: Insecta
- Order: Hemiptera
- Suborder: Auchenorrhyncha
- Infraorder: Fulgoromorpha
- Family: Nogodinidae
- Subfamily: Nogodininae
- Tribe: Pisachini
- Genus: Pisacha; Distant, 1906

Genus of insects

External image
- Image at iNaturalist

Pisacha is a genus of planthoppers in the tribe Pisachini in the subfamily Nogodininae, erected by William Lucas Distant in 1906. Species have been recorded from South East Asia and Japan.

== Species ==
Fulgoromorpha Lists on the Web includes:

1. Pisacha baculiformis Meng, Wang & Wang, 2014
2. Pisacha balteiformis Meng, Wang & Wang, 2014
3. Pisacha encaustica (Jacobi, 1916)
4. Pisacha falcata Meng, Wang & Wang, 2014
5. Pisacha kwangsiensis Chou & Lu, 1977
6. Pisacha naga Distant, 1906 - type species
7. Pisacha yinggensis Meng, Wang & Wang, 2014
