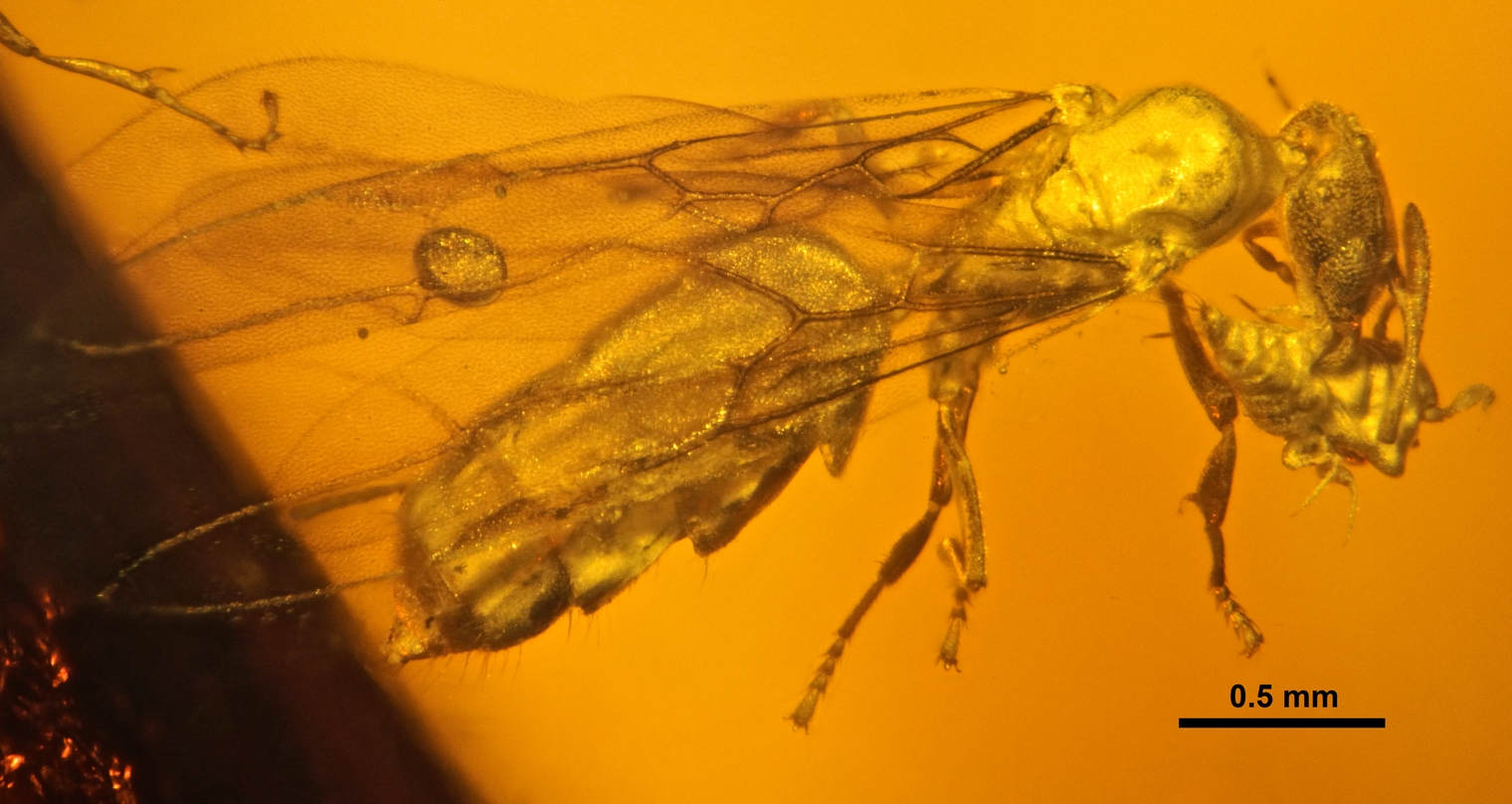
- A. glaesaria with Electromyrmococcus inclusus

Scientific classification
- Kingdom: Animalia
- Phylum: Arthropoda
- Clade: Pancrustacea
- Class: Insecta
- Order: Hymenoptera
- Family: Formicidae
- Subfamily: Formicinae
- Genus: Acropyga
- Species: †A. glaesaria

Binomial name
- †Acropyga glaesaria LaPolla, 2005

= Acropyga glaesaria =

Acropyga glaesaria Temporal range: Burdigalian?

Extinct species of ant

Acropyga glaesaria is an extinct species of ant in the subfamily Formicinae known from a group of possibly Miocene fossils found on Hispaniola. A. glaesaria is the first species of the ant genus Acropyga to have been described from fossils found in Dominican amber and is the one of several species of Acropyga found in the West Indies. As with other members of the genus, A. glaesaria was most likely trophobiotic.

== History and classification ==
Acropyga glaesaria is known from six fossil insects which are inclusions in transparent chunks of Dominican amber. The amber was produced by the extinct Hymenaea protera, which formerly grew on Hispaniola, across northern South America and up to southern Mexico. The specimens were collected from undetermined amber mines in fossil bearing rocks of the Cordillera Septentrional mountains, northern Dominican Republic. The amber dates from at least the Burdigalian stage of the Miocene, based on studying the associated fossil foraminifera and may be as old as the Middle Eocene, based on the associated fossil coccoliths. This age range is due to the host rock being secondary deposits for the amber, and the Miocene the age range is only the youngest that it might be.

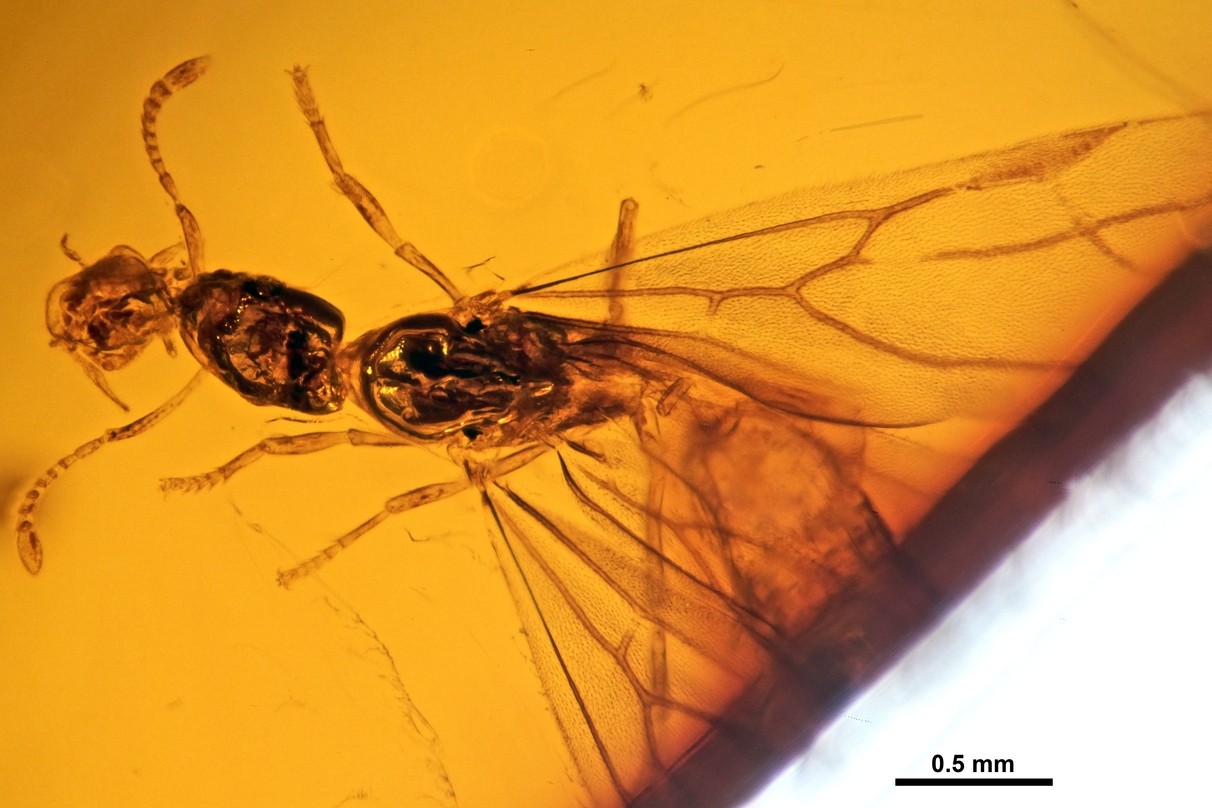
Dorsal view of an A. glaesaria paratype

The holotype amber specimen, number DR-16-603, entombs an alate queen associated with the only known Electromyrmococcus inclusus, and one paratype queen, in a separate amber specimen with the E. reginae holotype, are currently preserved in the American Museum of Natural History in New York. A single specimen in the collections at the Naturmuseum Senckenberg in Frankfurt, Germany preserves two more paratype queens and the two known paratype males, all in association with the holotype of E. abductus. The fossils were first studied by entomologist John LaPolla of the Smithsonian Institution. LaPolla's 2005 type description of the new species was published in the journal Transactions of the American Entomological Society. The specific epithet glaesaria is derived from the Latin for "of amber" in reference to the preservation of the fossils.

Prior to the species formal description in 2005 the fossils had been attributed to the genus Brachymyrmex and in the 2001 description of Electromyrmococcus specimens of A. glaesaria were suggested to represent several different Acropyga species. The generic placement was stabilized with a review and clarification of the scope of Acropyga by LaPolla in 2004, while the suggestion of multiple species based on morphology was shown to be an artifact of distortion and preservation in the amber. The association of A. glaesaria and the Electromyrmococcus species is one of the oldest examples of trophobiosis. Modern Acropyga are thought to be fully reliant on mealy bug species as their source of food and reproductive only emerge from the nest during the mating flight, each carrying a seed bug in their mandibles.

== Description ==
The Acropyga glaesaria specimens are well preserved, though the specimens show some distortion from the amber moving after entombment. The specimens of queens have estimated body lengths between 2.37–2.94 millimetres (0.093–0.116 in), while the measured male shows a length of about 1.63 millimetres (0.064 in). The overall coloration of the A. glaesaria queens is a light yellow tone, typical for members of the genus and the males are a slightly darker dusky yellow which is also typical. The antennae are thickened with nine total segments, the apical of which is a little longer than the next three segments combined. The mandibles have eight teeth overall, with the fourth and seventh from the mandible apex being the longest.
