= Nezpercius =

Nezpercius Temporal range: Late Cretaceous, 83.5–65.5 Ma

Scientific classification
- Kingdom: Animalia
- Phylum: Chordata
- Class: Amphibia
- Clade: Caudata
- Genus: †Nezpercius; Blob, Carrano, Rogers, Forster, and Espinoza, 2001

Type species
- † Nezpercius dodsoni Blob, Carrano, Rogers, Forster, and Espinoza, 2001

Extinct genus of amphibians

Nezpercius is an extinct genus of prehistoric amphibian.
