= Belgirallus =

Belgirallus Temporal range: Oligocene

Scientific classification
- Kingdom: Animalia
- Phylum: Chordata
- Class: Aves
- Order: Gruiformes
- Family: Rallidae
- Genus: †Belgirallus; Mayr & Smith 2001

Species
- †B. minutus; †B. oligocaenus

Extinct genus of birds

Belgirallus is a genus of prehistoric rail that existed in Belgium during the Oligocene.
