= Tainosia =

Tainosia Temporal range: Burdigalian

Scientific classification
- Kingdom: Animalia
- Phylum: Arthropoda
- Clade: Pancrustacea
- Class: Insecta
- Order: Hemiptera
- Suborder: Auchenorrhyncha
- Infraorder: Fulgoromorpha
- Family: Nogodinidae
- Subfamily: Nogodininae
- Tribe: Nogodinini
- Genus: †Tainosia; Szwedo & Stroiński, 2001
- Species: †T. quisqueyae

Binomial name
- †Tainosia quisqueyae Szwedo & Stroiński, 2001

Extinct genus of true bugs

Tainosia is an extinct monotypic genus of planthopper in the Nogodinidae subfamily Nogodininae and at present, it contains the single species Tainosia quisqueyae. The genus is solely known from the early Miocene, Burdigalian stage, Dominican amber deposits on the island of Hispaniola.

== History and classification ==
Tainosia quisqueyae is known only from one fossil, the holotype, number "BMNH Pal. PI II 62". It is a single individual of indeterminate sex preserved in a clear orange amber specimen. The specimen is mostly complete, though the right tegmen torn, and the hind legs are partly destroyed. The insect was entombed while in resting posture, with both the hemelytra and hindwings mostly closed. The amber is currently residing in the Department of Palaeontology paleoentomology collections of the Natural History Museum in London, England. T. quisqueyae was first studied by Jacek Szwedo and Adam Stroiński, with their 2001 type description being published in the journal Genus. The generic name "Tainosia" was coined by Jacek Szwedo and Adam Stroiński in reference to the Tainos people who were native to Hispaniola and other islands of the Greater Antilles. The specific epithet "quisqueyae" was designated in honor of one of the original names for Hispaniola, "Quisqueya". As with the extinct Tonocatecutlius gibsoni, T. quisqueyae is placed in the Nogodininae tribe Nogodinini. All other extinct members of the family Nogodinidae currently described from the Americas are restricted to the subfamily Nogodininae.

== Description ==
Tainosia quisqueyae is 14.4 millimetres (0.57 in) in length and has a wing length of 8.73 millimetres (0.344 in). Though similar to the related genus Tonocatecutlius known from Mexican amber, there are several notable differences between the genera. Tonocatecutlius has a mesonotum which is smooth and uninterrupted, while Tainosia has a mesonotum that bears anterolateral carinae. The forewing of Tainosia has a costal cell and clavus without transverse veinlets, while Tonocatecutlius has a costal cell and clavus crossed by veinlets. Similar to Tonocatecutlius is the network of veins crossing the upper half of the tegmen. The tegmen is semi-hyaline with faint but distinct color patterning present, the hindwing is hyaline and without any patterning.
