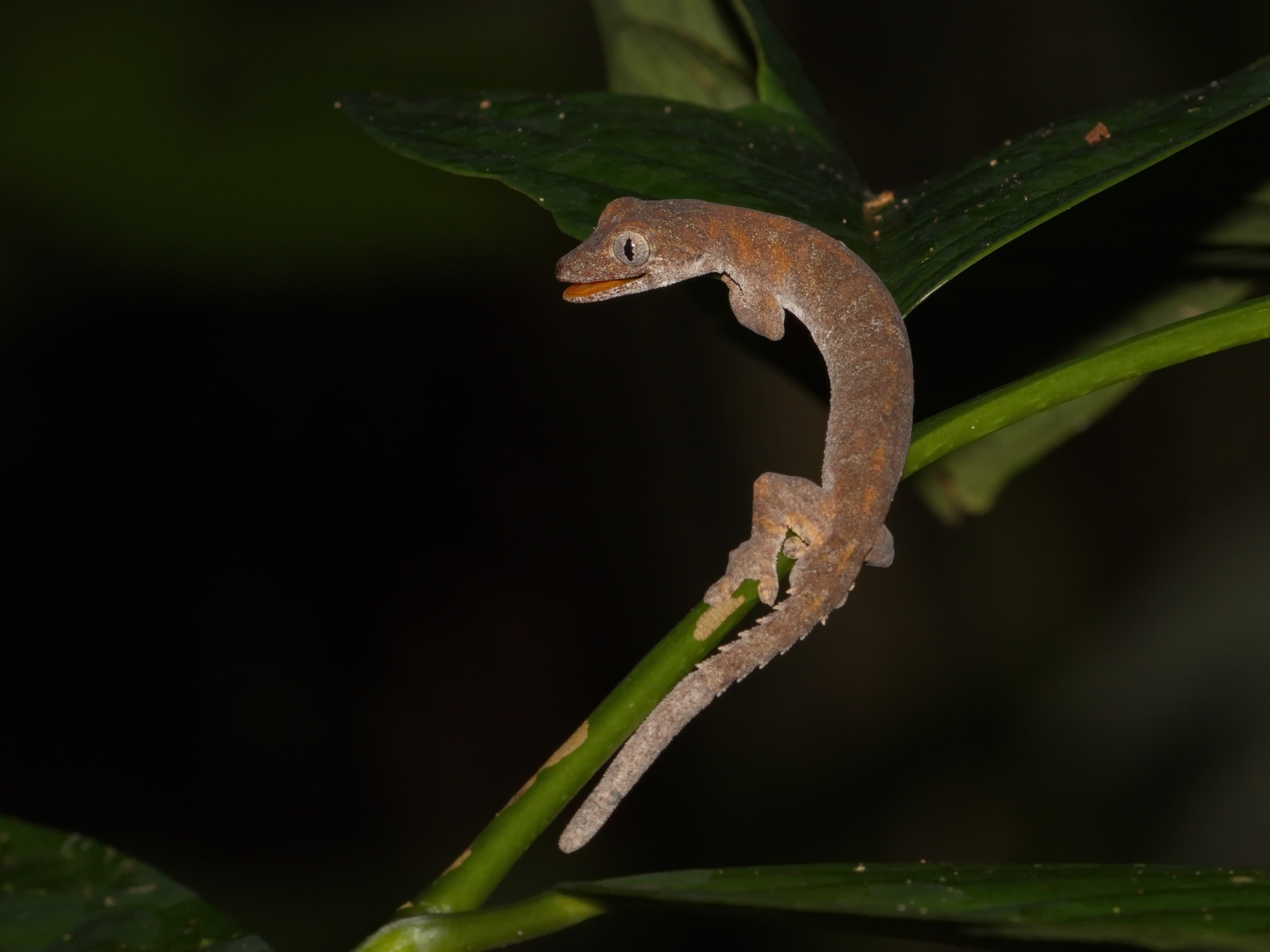

Conservation status
- Least Concern (IUCN 3.1)

Scientific classification
- Kingdom: Animalia
- Phylum: Chordata
- Class: Reptilia
- Order: Squamata
- Suborder: Gekkota
- Family: Gekkonidae
- Genus: Gekko
- Species: G. browni

Binomial name
- Gekko browni (Russell, 1979)

Synonyms
- Luperosaurus browni Russell, 1979; Luperosaurus serraticaudus Ota, Sengoku & Hikida, 1996; Gekko (Sundagekko) browni — Wood et al., 2019

= Gekko browni =

Species of lizard

Gekko browni, also known commonly as Brown's gecko, Brown's fringe gecko, and Brown's wolf gecko, is a species of lizard in the family Gekkonidae. The species is endemic to West Malaysia.

== Etymology ==
The specific name, browni, is in honor of American herpetologist Walter Creighton Brown.

== Habitat ==
The preferred natural habitat of G. browni is forest.

== Behavior ==
G. browni is arboreal, usually staying at least 2 m (6.6 ft) above the ground.

== Reproduction ==
G. browni is oviparous.
