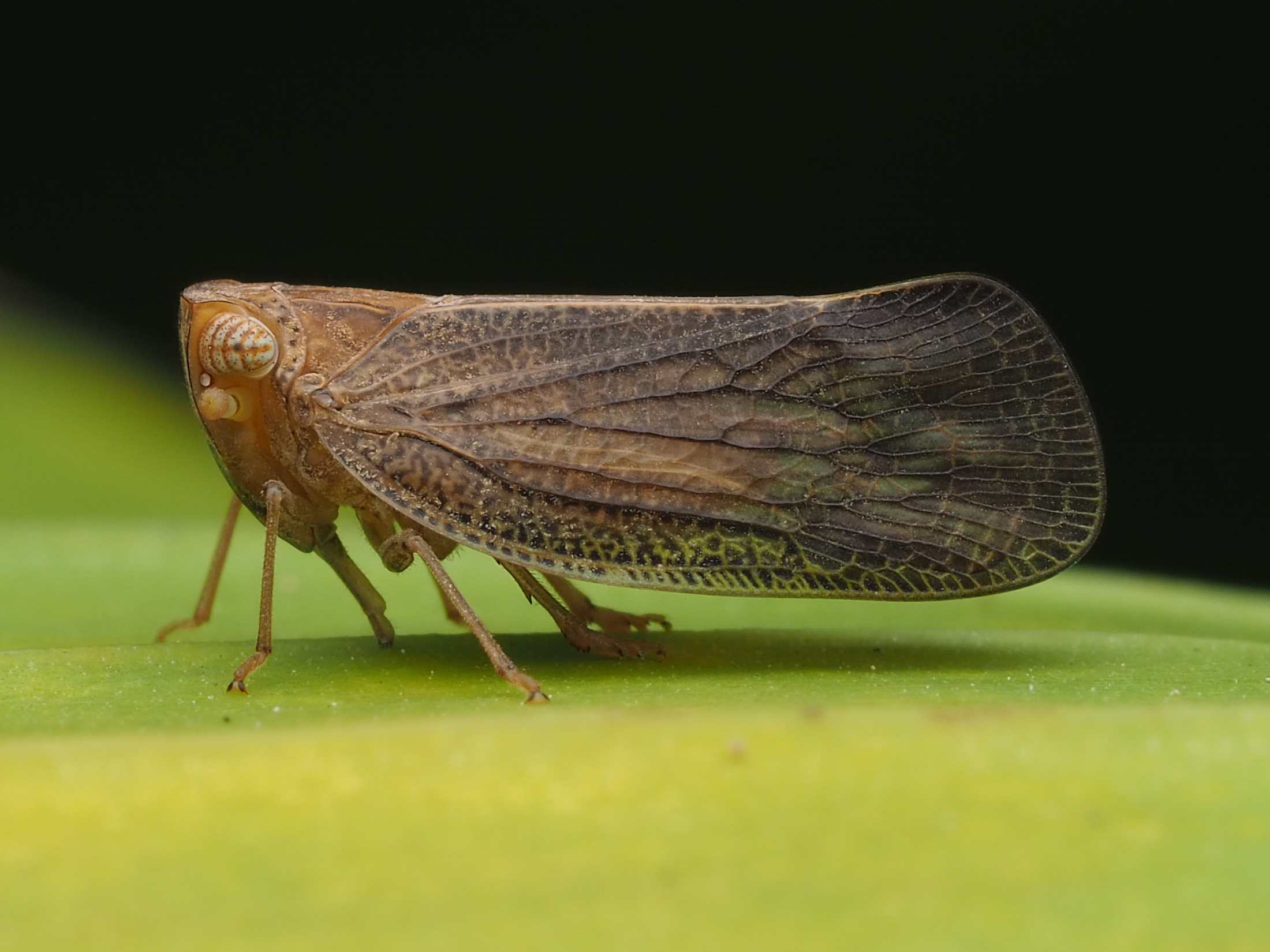
- Bladina sp. from Belize

Scientific classification
- Kingdom: Animalia
- Phylum: Arthropoda
- Clade: Pancrustacea
- Class: Insecta
- Order: Hemiptera
- Suborder: Auchenorrhyncha
- Infraorder: Fulgoromorpha
- Superfamily: Fulgoroidea
- Family: Nogodinidae; Melichar, 1898

= Nogodinidae =

Family of true bugs

Nogodinidae is a family of planthoppers. They have membranous wings with delicate venation and can be confused with members of other Fulgoroid families such as the Issidae and Tropiduchidae. Some authors treat it as a subfamily of the Issidae.

== Description ==
Some of their key features are a frons ("face") that is longer than wide and a reticulate wing venation. They are less than 2 cm long. The antenna arises well below the eye, has the base clubbed and flagellum unsegmented. The lateral ocelli (simple eyes) are outside the margins of the face. The face has carinae (or keels) on the edge. On the hind leg, the second tarsal segment has an apical spine arising from it. The tibia of the hind leg also has spines towards the tip. An important family character is found in the shape of the male genital structure, a style that is longer than broad. Most members of this family are forest species.

== Taxonomy ==
Four subfamilies are included in BioLib.cz:

subfamily Bladininae Kirkaldy, 1907

1. Bladina Stål, 1859 - central and South America

subfamily Gastriniinae Fennah, 1987

1. Gastrinia Stål, 1859 - Brasil

=== Colpopterinae ===
Auth.: Gnezdilov, 2003 - central America, southern Africa

1. Bumerangum Gnezdilov, 2012
2. Caudibeccus Gnezdilov & O'Brien, 2008
3. Colpoptera Burmeister, 1835
4. Dozierana Gnezdilov, 2018
5. Jamaha Gnezdilov & O'Brien, 2008
6. Neocolpoptera Dozier, 1931
7. Ugoa Fennah, 1945

=== Nogodininae ===
Auth.: Melichar, 1898; tribes and representative genera:

Bilbiliini Gnezdilov, 2017 (monotypic)

- Bilbilis Stål, 1861

Epacriini Gerstaecker, 1895

- Epacria Gerstaecker, 1895

Lipocalliini Fennah, 1984

- Lipocallia Kirkaldy, 1906

Mithymnini Fennah, 1967

- Mithymna Stål, 1861

Nogodinini Melichar, 1898

- Nogodina Stål, 1859
- †Tainosia Szwedo & Stroiński, 2001

Pisachini Fennah, 1978

- Pisacha Distant, 1906

Tongini Kirkaldy, 1907

- Tonga Kirkaldy, 1900

Varciini Fennah, 1978

- Varcia Stål, 1870
- Convarcia Schmidt, 1919
- Detya Distant, 1906
- Miriza Stål, 1862
- Paravarcia Schmidt, 1919
- Probletomus Gerstaecker, 1895
- Varciella Melichar, 1923

=== Extant genera incertae sedis ===
1. Hadjia Dlabola, 1981
2. Iranissus Dlabola, 1980
3. Issarius Metcalf, 1950
4. Issidius Puton, 1898
5. Sinonogodinia Zhang, Chen & Zhang, 2026

== Fossil taxa ==
- subfamily †Ambitaktoinae Szwedo, 2019
- Approximately 10 genera incertae sedis

Several fossil species have been described from mid-Cretaceous Myanmar, Eocene Baltic, Miocene Chiapas, and Miocene Dominican amber. Additionally, a tribe, Celinapterixini, has been erected on the basis of an Argentinian fossil that could not be placed in any of the tribes of extant Nogodinid hoppers.
