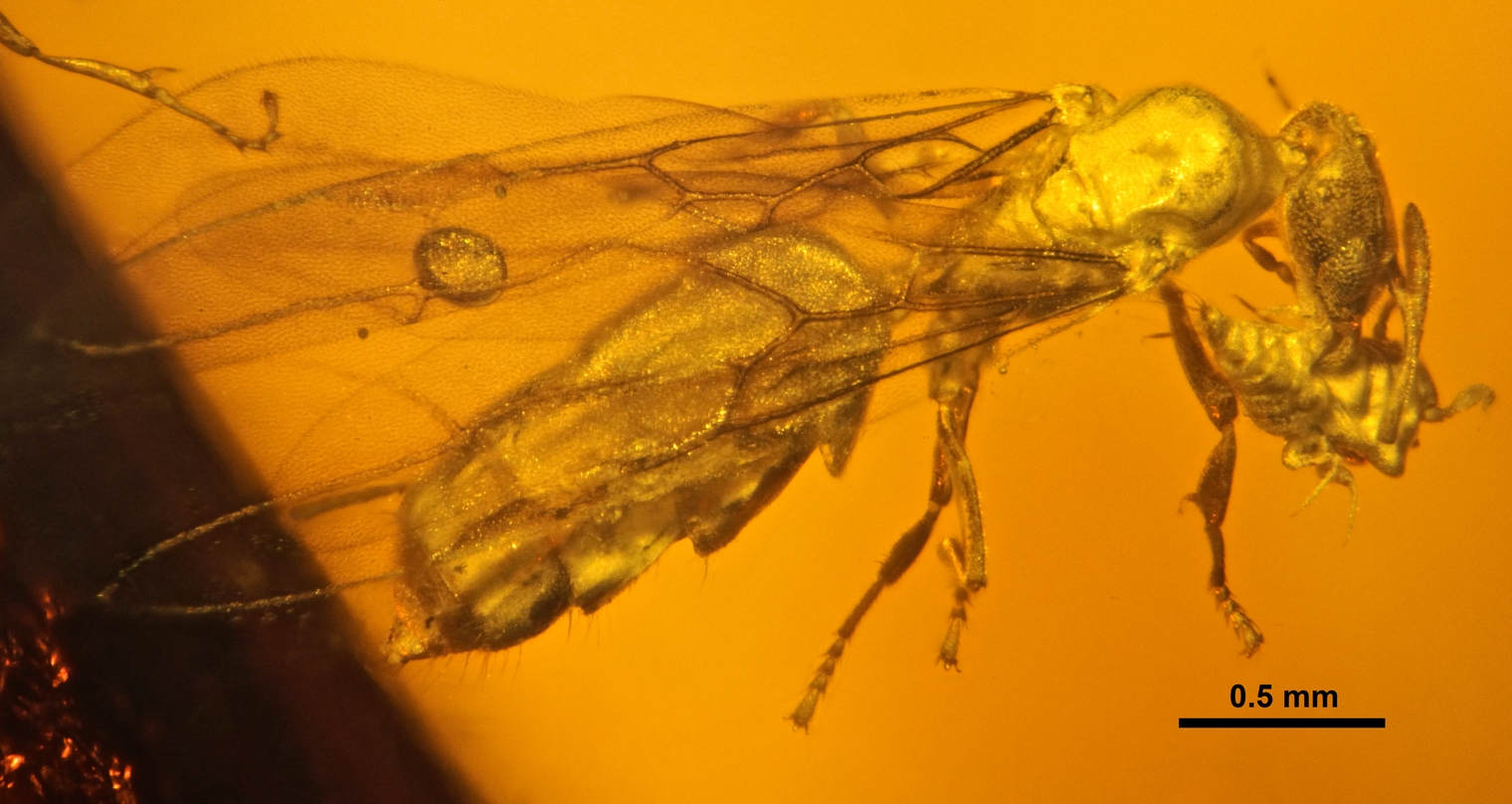
- E. abductus carried by Acropyga glaesaria

Scientific classification
- Domain: Eukaryota
- Kingdom: Animalia
- Phylum: Arthropoda
- Class: Insecta
- Order: Hemiptera
- Suborder: Sternorrhyncha
- Family: Pseudococcidae
- Subfamily: Rhizoecinae
- Genus: †Electromyrmococcus; Williams, 2001

Species
- †E. abductus; †E. inclusus; †E. reginae

= Electromyrmococcus =

Electromyrmococcus Temporal range: Burdigalian

Extinct genus of true bugs

Electromyrmococcus is an extinct genus of mealybug in the Pseudococcidae subfamily Rhizoecinae. The genus currently contains three species, all from the early Miocene, Burdigalian stage, Dominican amber deposits on the island of Hispaniola.

== History and classification ==
The genus was first described by Douglas Williams as an appendix to a 2001 paper published in the journal American Museum Novitates. The genus name is a combination of electro, from the Greek ἤλεκτρον (elektron) meaning "amber", myrmo from the Greek μύρμηξ (myrmex) meaning "ant" and Coccus from the ant-tended genus of mealybugs, in reference to the association of ant and mealybugs in amber. Along with the genus description, the paper contained the description of the type species E. abductus and the two additional species E. inclusus and E. reginae.

== Description ==
Electromyrmococcus possesses a combination of traits which are not found in any one modern genus belonging to the Rhizoecinae, a subfamily of the mealybugs. Living Rhizoecinae are separated into two groups of closely related genera, the Rhizoceus group and the Eumyrmococcus group. Antennae of the Rhizoceus group have six segments, at least as wide as they are long. The antennae of the Eumyrmococcus group have two to five long slender segments. Electromyrmococcus has long slender antennae with six segments.

Electromyrmococcus species have an enlarged cephalothorax and an abdomen that gradually tapers down to a pointed end. Along the last segments of the abdomen are a number of setae which may be grouped on small poorly developed anal lobes or spaced out on the ventral margin of the abdominal segment.

All known specimens of Electromyrmococcus are preserved in amber, and all are either being clutched in the mandibles of Acropyga glaesaria species ants, or in other close association with them. Mealybugs in the Rhizoecinae subfamily are often obligatorily symbiotic with Acropyga species; when forming new nests the queens and gynes will bring a seed "herd" of mealybugs from the old colony. This carrying behavior is the probable reason for the preservation of the Electromyrmococcus specimens and represents the oldest record of this symbiosis.

=== E. abductus ===
E. abductus was described from the holotype, a single elongated piriform female 0.7 millimetres (0.028 in) long, clutched in the mandibles of an Acropyga glaesaria adult. Very weakly formed anal lobes are found on segment eight of the abdomen and each lobe has four setae. Setae are also present on the abdominal segments leading to segment eight. The amber was recovered from the La Toca mine group northeast of Santiago de los Caballeros in the Cibao Valley. The holotype is deposited in the Senckenberg Museum of Frankfurt, Germany. The species epithet abductus, which is Latin for "carried off", was chosen by Williams in reference to the mealybug being preserved in the ant's mandibles.

=== E. inclusus ===
E. inclusus is the second species which was named in the 2001 paper. The holotype female, and only specimen, is deposited in the American Museum of Natural History as "number DR-14–403". The female is 0.76 millimetres (0.030 in) long with a typical tapering abdomen. The abdomen has well-defined segments with segment eight possessing slightly developed anal lobes sporting four setae each, and segment two with a pair of submedial projections. The female has a notable constriction present between the abdomen and the thorax. However the constriction was probably not a feature possessed by the species in life, but rather thought to be a result of being compressed by the ant closely associated with it when they became trapped in resin. Williams collaborated with Donat Agosti in the description of E. inclusus. They chose the specific epithet inclusus which is a Latin participle meaning "enclosed" or "imprisoned" in allusion to the female's preservation in amber.

=== E. reginae ===
The third known species is E. reginae, which, like the other known species, is known from a single female specimen preserved in amber. E. reginae is the largest of the three species at 0.80 millimetres (0.031 in) in length. Noted to be closely related to E. inclusus, the anal lobes of E. reginae are not as well developed but do possess four setae each. The well-developed legs of E. reginae also have some setae present. Like E. abductus the E. reginae female was preserved in the mandibles of an Acropyga glaesaria ant, this one a queen. In reference to this the specific epithet reginae comes from the Latin regina meaning "belonging to a queen".
