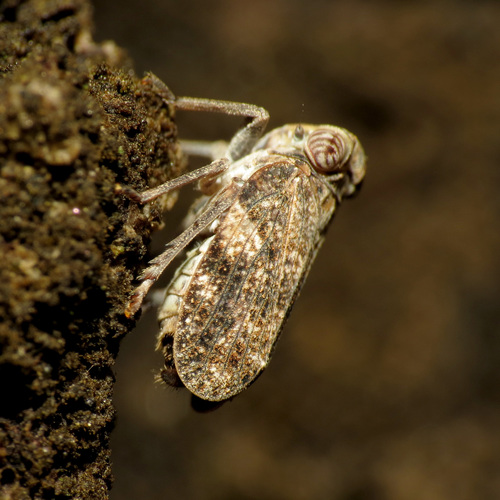
- Picumna chinai

Scientific classification
- Domain: Eukaryota
- Kingdom: Animalia
- Phylum: Arthropoda
- Class: Insecta
- Order: Hemiptera
- Suborder: Auchenorrhyncha
- Infraorder: Fulgoromorpha
- Superfamily: Fulgoroidea
- Family: Issidae
- Subfamily: Hemisphaeriinae
- Genus: Picumna; Stål, 1864

= Picumna =

Genus of planthoppers

Picumna is a genus of planthopper in the family Issidae. They can be found in the Southwestern United States and Central America. Picumna species are often confused with Thionia species, but can be differentiated as Picumna have four spines on their hind tibia, whereas Thionia have fewer.

== Species ==
- Picumna chinai Doering, 1939
- Picumna maculata (Melichar, 1906)
- Picumna mexicana Stål, 1864
- Picumna ovatipennis (Walker, 1858)
- Picumna procidua (Melichar, 1906)
- Picumna subovata Caldwell, 1945
- Picumna subrotundata (Fowler, 1904)
- Picumna testacea Metcalf, 1938
- Picumna varians Stål, 1864
- Picumna venosa Fowler, 1905
