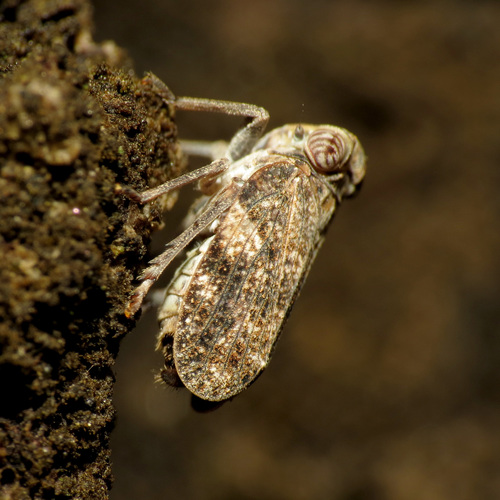

Scientific classification
- Domain: Eukaryota
- Kingdom: Animalia
- Phylum: Arthropoda
- Class: Insecta
- Order: Hemiptera
- Suborder: Auchenorrhyncha
- Infraorder: Fulgoromorpha
- Family: Issidae
- Subfamily: Hemisphaeriinae
- Genus: Picumna
- Species: P. chinai

Binomial name
- Picumna chinai Doering, 1939

= Picumna chinai =

Species of insect

Picumna chinai is a species of planthopper in the family Issidae. They can be found across the Southwestern United States and Central America.
