= List of Tropiduchidae genera =

This is a list of 162 genera in the family Tropiduchidae, tropiduchid planthoppers.

== Tropiduchidae genera ==
- Achilorma Metcalf and Bruner, 1930
- Acrisius Stål, 1862
- Aethomyctus Williams, 1981
- Afroelfus Gnezdilov, 2012
- Alcestis Stål, 1862
- Alcumena Schmidt, 1932
- Alleloplasis Waterhouse, 1839
- Alphesiboea Schmidt, 1932
- Amaclardea Muir, 1931
- Amapala Melichar, 1914
- Antabhoga Distant, 1912
- Arenasella Schmidt, 1932
- Aripoa Fennah, 1945
- Athestia Melichar, 1914
- Bananellodes Strand, 1928
- Biruga Fennah, 1944
- Busas Jacobi, 1909
- Caffrommatissus Fennah, 1967
- Camerunilla Haglund, 1899
- Catullia Stål, 1870
- Catulliaria Muir, 1931
- Catullioides Bierman, 1910
- Chasmacephala Fennah, 1945
- Cixiopsis Matsumura, 1900
- Clardea Signoret, 1862
- Colgorma Kirkaldy, 1904
- Conchyoptera Signoret, 1860
- Cuneoceps Williams, 1981
- Cyphoceratops Uhler, 1901
- Cyrtomycta Williams, 1981
- Danepteryx Uhler, 1889
- Daradacella Fennah, 1949
- Daradax Walker, 1857
- Daradaxoides Distant, 1917
- Diagrynia Melichar, 1914
- Diambon O'Brien, 2010
- Dichoneura Lethierry, 1890
- Dictyobia Uhler, 1889
- Dictyonia Uhler, 1889
- Dictyonissus Uhler, 1876
- Dictyotangia Fennah, 1945
- Dictyssa Melichar, 1906
- Dictyssonia Ball, 1936
- Dioxyomus Fennah, 1945
- Duriopsis Melichar, 1906
- Durium Stål, 1861
- Dyctidea Uhler, 1889
- Eilithyia Distant, 1912
- Eodryas Kirkaldy, 1907
- Epora Walker, 1857
- Eporiella Melichar, 1914
- Eucameruna Melichar, 1906
- Eutropistes Schaum, 1853
- Exphora Signoret, 1860
- Ficarasa Walker, 1857
- Fritzruehlia Schmidt, 1924
- Gaetulia Stål, 1864
- Gamergomorphus Melichar, 1906
- Gamergus Stål, 1859
- Garumna Melichar, 1914
- Garumnella Wang, Liang and Webb, 2009
- Gergithomorphus Haglund, 1899
- Grynia Stål, 1862
- Haliartus Melichar, 1914
- Heinsenia Melichar, 1906
- Idiomyctus Williams, 1981
- Indogaetulia Schmidt, 1919
- Ingoma Fennah, 1954
- Inkewana Hesse, 1925
- Intandela Hesse, 1925
- Isporisa Walker, 1857
- Isporisella Baker, 1927
- Johannesburgia Distant, 1907
- Kallitambinia Muir, 1931
- Kallitaxila Kirkaldy, 1901
- Kazerunia Dlabola, 1974
- Kirongoziella Schmidt, 1924
- Laberia Stål, 1866
- Ladella Stål, 1859
- Ladellodes Fennah, 1965
- Lagoana Melichar, 1905
- Lanshu Yang, Yang and Wilson, 1989
- Lavora Muir, 1931
- Leptotambinia Kato, 1931
- Leptovanua Melichar, 1914
- Leusaba Walker, 1857
- Macrovanua Fennah, 1950
- Manganeutes Fennah, 1965
- Mesepora Matsumura, 1914
- Misodema Melichar, 1907
- Monopsis Spinola, 1839
- Montrouzierana Signoret, 1861
- Neaethus Stål, 1861
- Neocatara Distant, 1910
- Neommatissus Muir, 1913
- Neorudia Fennah, 1945
- Neotangia Melichar, 1914
- Neotaxilana Synave, 1979
- Neotaxilanoides Men and Qin, 2011
- Neotylana Distant, 1909
- Nesotaxila Fennah, 1971
- Nesotemora Fennah, 1956
- Neurotmeta Guérin-Méneville, 1856
- Nubithia Stål, 1859
- Numicia Stål, 1866
- Nurunderia Distant, 1909
- Obedas Jacobi, 1910
- Oechalina Melichar, 1914
- Oligaethus Jacobi, 1928
- Ommatissus Fieber, 1875
- Osbornia Ball, 1910
- Ossoides Bierman, 1910
- Paragamergomorphus Synave, 1956
- Parahydriena Muir, 1924
- Paralasonia Muir, 1924
- Paricana Walker, 1857
- Paricanoides Liang, 2003
- Paruzelia Melichar, 1903
- Peggioga Kirkaldy, 1905
- Pelitropis Van Duzee, 1908
- Peltodictya Kirkaldy, 1906
- Pseudoclardea Williams, 1981
- Pseudogergithus Schmidt, 1912
- Pseudoparicana Melichar, 1914
- Pseudotangia Metcalf, 1938
- Pucina Stål, 1866
- Remosa Distant, 1906
- Rhinodictya Kirkaldy, 1906
- Riancia Signoret, 1860
- Rotunosa Distant, 1906
- Sakina Synave, 1978
- Salona Stål, 1866
- Scenoma Fennah, 1969
- Scolopsomorpha Melichar, 1912
- Siopaphora Metcalf, 1952
- Sogana Matsumura, 1914
- Spathocranus Muir, 1934
- Stacota Stål, 1859
- Stenoconchyoptera Muir, 1931
- Stiborus Melichar, 1903
- Sumbana Lallemand and Synave, 1953
- Swezeyaria Metcalf, 1946
- Tambinia Stål, 1859
- Tangella Metcalf and Bruner, 1930
- Tangia Stål, 1859
- Tangidia Uhler, 1895
- Tangiopsis Uhler, 1901
- Tangyria Uhler, 1901
- Tauropola Jacobi, 1944
- Teramnon Fennah, 1969
- Thaumantia Melichar, 1914
- Thymbra Melichar, 1914
- Trienopa Signoret, 1860
- Tropiduchodes Schmidt, 1910
- Tropiduchus Stål, 1854
- Trypetimorpha Costa, 1862
- Turneriola China, 1923
- Ubis Fennah, 1945
- Vanua Kirkaldy, 1906
- Vanuoides Metcalf, 1938
- Varma Distant, 1906
- Zema Fennah, 1956
