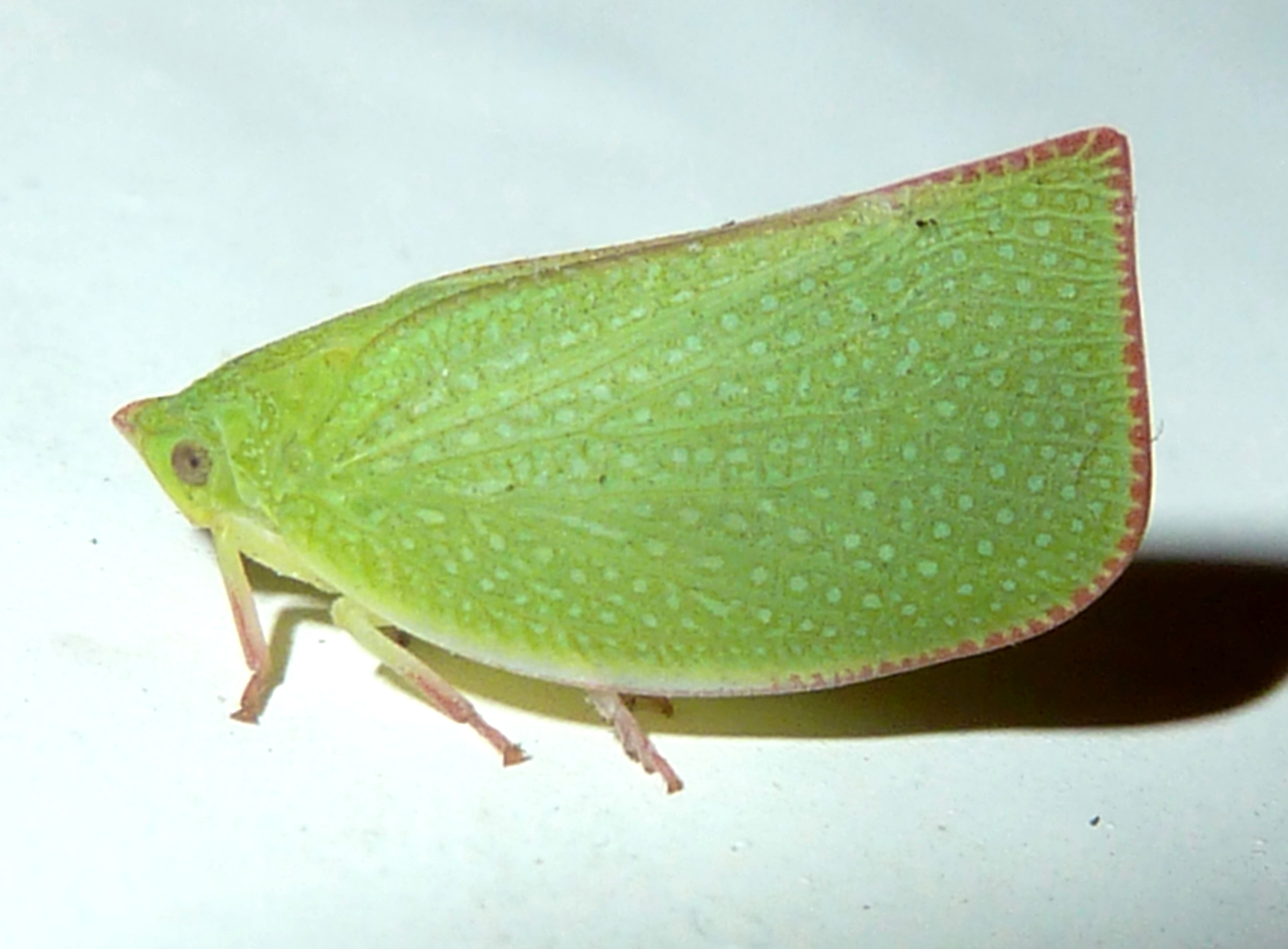
- Parathiscia from South Africa
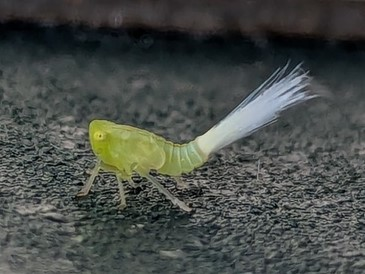
- Dictyonissus griphus from Mexico

Scientific classification
- Kingdom: Animalia
- Phylum: Arthropoda
- Clade: Pancrustacea
- Class: Insecta
- Order: Hemiptera
- Suborder: Auchenorrhyncha
- Infraorder: Fulgoromorpha
- Family: Tropiduchidae
- Subfamily: Elicinae; Melichar, 1915

Tribes
- 8 tribes (see text)

= Elicinae =

Subfamily of true bugs

Elicinae is a subfamily of planthoppers that belongs to the family Tropiduchidae.

== Taxonomy ==
Elicinids are ‘non-typical tropiduchids’ of the family Tropiduchidae. The type genus of this subfamily is Elica. There are four extant and four extinct tribes, with genera including:

=== †Austrini Szwedo & Stroiński, 2010 ===
- Austris Szwedo & Stroiński, 2010

=== Bucini Gnezdilov, Bartlett & Bourgoin, 2016 ===
- Buca Walker, 1858^{c g}
- †Krundia Szwedo, 2019

=== Elicini Melichar, 1915 ===
- Acrisius Stål, 1862
- Danepteryx Uhler, 1889^{i c g b}
- Dictyobia Uhler, 1889^{i c g b}
- Dictyonia Uhler, 1889^{i c g b}
- Dictyonissus Uhler, 1876
- Dictyssa Melichar, 1906
- Dyctidea Uhler, 1889
- Elica - monotypic Elica latipennis Walker, 1857^{c g}
- Misodema Melichar, 1907^{i c g b}
- Neaethus Stål, 1861^{i c g b}
- Osbornia Ball, 1910^{i c g b}

=== Elibucini Zhou & Chang, 2026 ===
- Elibuca Zhou & Chang, 2026

=== †Gedanotropidini Szwedo & Stroiński, 2017 ===
- Gedanotropis Szwedo & Stroiński, 2017

=== †Laberiini Stroiński, Bourgoin & Szwedo, 2022 ===
- Laberia Stroiński, Bourgoin & Szwedo, 2022

=== Parathisciini Gnezdilov, 2013 ===
- Hemithiscia Schmidt, 1912
- Paraphilatis Melichar, 1914
- Parathiscia Melichar, 1901
- Pseudothiscia Schmidt, 1912

=== †Patollini Szwedo & Stroiński, 2013 ===
- Patollo Szwedo & Stroiński, 2013

Data sources: i = ITIS, c = Catalogue of Life, g = GBIF, b = Bugguide.net

=== Taxonomic history ===
This subfamily was moved back into the family Tropiduchidae by Gnezdilov (2013) which also moved Elicini from Nogodinidae here too. This united it with Gaetuliini while simultaneously establishing the tribe Parathisciini. Later, the tribe Bucini was added to this subfamily. In 2026, the tribe Elibucini was established.

== Distribution ==
They have a wide distribution being found in places such as South America or Africa. In China, Elicinae are represented only by the tribe Elicini with the genera Indogaetulia and Connelicita. The lack of Chinese representatives discovered and described so far could mean that the fauna of this region is insufficiently explored with additional undescribed taxa being likely to occur.

== Description ==
Members of this subfamily are ‘non-typical tropiduchids’ differing from them with their more steeply tectiform body shape. They also have issid-like female genitalia with rounded structures, a triangular first valvulae with a well-developed anterior connective laminae and a gonoplac lacking marginal teeth or bearing only minute denticles.
