= List of Tropiduchinae genera =

These 103 genera belong to the subfamily Tropiduchinae, tropiduchid planthoppers.

== Tropiduchinae genera ==
- Achilorma Metcalf & Bruner, 1930^{i c g}
- Alcestis Stål, 1862^{i c g}
- Alcumena Schmidt, 1932^{i c g}
- Alphesiboea Schmidt, 1932^{i c g}
- Amaclardea Muir, 1931^{i c g}
- Amapala Melichar, 1914^{i c g}
- Antabhoga Distant, 1912^{i c g}
- Arenasella Schmidt, 1932^{i c g}
- Athestia Melichar, 1914^{i c g}
- Barunoides Distant, 1912^{c g}
- Biruga Fennah, 1944^{i c g}
- Caffrommatissus Fennah, 1967^{i c g}
- Catullia Stål, 1870^{i c g}
- Catulliaria Muir, 1931^{i c g}
- Chasmacephala Fennah, 1945^{i c g}
- Chrysopuchus Gnezdilov, 2013^{c g}
- Cixiopsis Matsumura, 1900^{i c g}
- Clardeina Fennah, 1982
- Colgorma Kirkaldy, 1904^{i c g}
- Cyphoceratops Uhler, 1901^{i c g}
- Daradacella Fennah, 1949^{i c g}
- Daradax Walker, 1857^{i c g}
- Diambon O'Brien, 2010^{i c g}
- Dichoneura Lethierry, 1890^{i c g}
- Duriina Fennah, 1982
- Duriopsis Melichar, 1906^{i c g}
- Eilithyia Distant, 1912^{i c g}
- †Emiliana Shcherbakov, 2006^{c g}
- Eodryas Kirkaldy, 1907^{i c g}
- Eporina Fennah, 1982
- Eutropistina Kirkaldy, 1906
- Ficarasa Walker, 1857^{i c g}
- Fritzruehlia Schmidt, 1924^{i c g}
- Garumna Melichar, 1914^{i c g}
- Garumnella Wang, Liang & Webb, 2009^{i c g}
- Grynia Stål, 1862^{i c g}
- Hiracia Walker, 1857^{c g}
- Ingoma Fennah, 1954^{i c g}
- Isporisa Walker, 1857^{i c g}
- Isporisella Baker, 1927^{i c g}
- Jantaritambia Szwedo, 2000^{c g}
- Kallitambinia Muir, 1931^{i c g}
- Kallitaxila Kirkaldy, 1901^{i c g}
- Kazerunina Dlabola, 1974
- Lanshu Yang, Yang & Wilson, 1989^{i c g}
- Lavora Muir, 1931^{i c g}
- Leptotambinia Kato, 1931^{i c g}
- Leptovanua Melichar, 1914^{i c g}
- Leusaba Walker, 1857^{i c g}
- Lukabales Stroinski & Szwedo, 2015^{c g}
- Macrovanua Fennah, 1950^{i c g}
- Monopsis Spinola, 1839^{i c g}
- Montrouzierana Signoret, 1861^{i c g}
- Neocatara Distant, 1910^{i c g}
- Neommatissus Muir, 1913^{i c g}
- Neorudia Fennah, 1945^{i c g}
- Neotangiina Fennah, 1982
- Neotaxilanoides Men & Qin, 2011^{i c g}
- Neotylana Distant, 1909^{i c}
- Nesotaxila Fennah, 1971^{i c g}
- Nesotemora Fennah, 1956^{i c g}
- Neurotmeta Guérin-Méneville, 1856^{i c g}
- Numicia Stål, 1866^{i c g}
- Oechalina Melichar, 1914^{i c g}
- Oechalinella Wang, 2017
- Oligaethus Jacobi, 1928^{i c g}
- Ommatissus Fieber, 1875^{i c g}
- Ossoides Bierman, 1910^{i c g}
- Parahydriena Muir, 1924^{i c g}
- Paricana Walker, 1857^{i c g}
- Paricanoides Liang, 2003^{i c g}
- Paruzelia Melichar, 1903^{i c g}
- Patollo Szwedo & Stroinski, 2013^{c g}
- Peggioga Kirkaldy, 1905^{i c g}
- Peltodictya Kirkaldy, 1906^{i c g}
- Pseudoparicana Melichar, 1914^{i c g}
- Pseudotangia Metcalf, 1938^{i c g}
- Remosa Distant, 1906^{i c g}
- Rhinodictya Kirkaldy, 1906^{i c g}
- Rotunosa Distant, 1906^{i c g}
- Scenoma Fennah, 1969^{i c g}
- Sogana Matsumura, 1914^{i c g}
- Stacota Stål, 1859^{i c g}
- Stenoconchyoptera Muir, 1931^{i c g}
- Sumbana Lallemand & Synave, 1953^{i c g}
- Swezeyaria Metcalf, 1946^{i c g}
- Tambinia Stål, 1859^{i c g}
- Thymbra Melichar, 1914
- Tangiina Uhler, 1901^{i c g}
- Tangiopsis Uhler, 1901^{i c g}
- Tangyria Fennah, 1969^{i c g}
- Teramnon Melichar, 1914^{i c g}
- Thaumantia Melichar, 1914^{i c g}
- Togoda Melichar, 1906^{c g}
- Trienopa Signoret, 1860^{i c g}
- Tropiduchus Stål, 1854^{i c g}
- Trypetimorpha Costa, 1862^{i c g}
- Turneriola China, 1923^{i c g}
- Ubis Fennah, 1945^{i c g}
- Vanua Kirkaldy, 1906^{i c g}
- Vanuoides Metcalf, 1938^{i c g}
- Varma Distant, 1906^{i c g}
- Zema Fennah, 1956^{i c g}

Data sources: i = ITIS, c = Catalogue of Life, g = GBIF, b = Bugguide.net
