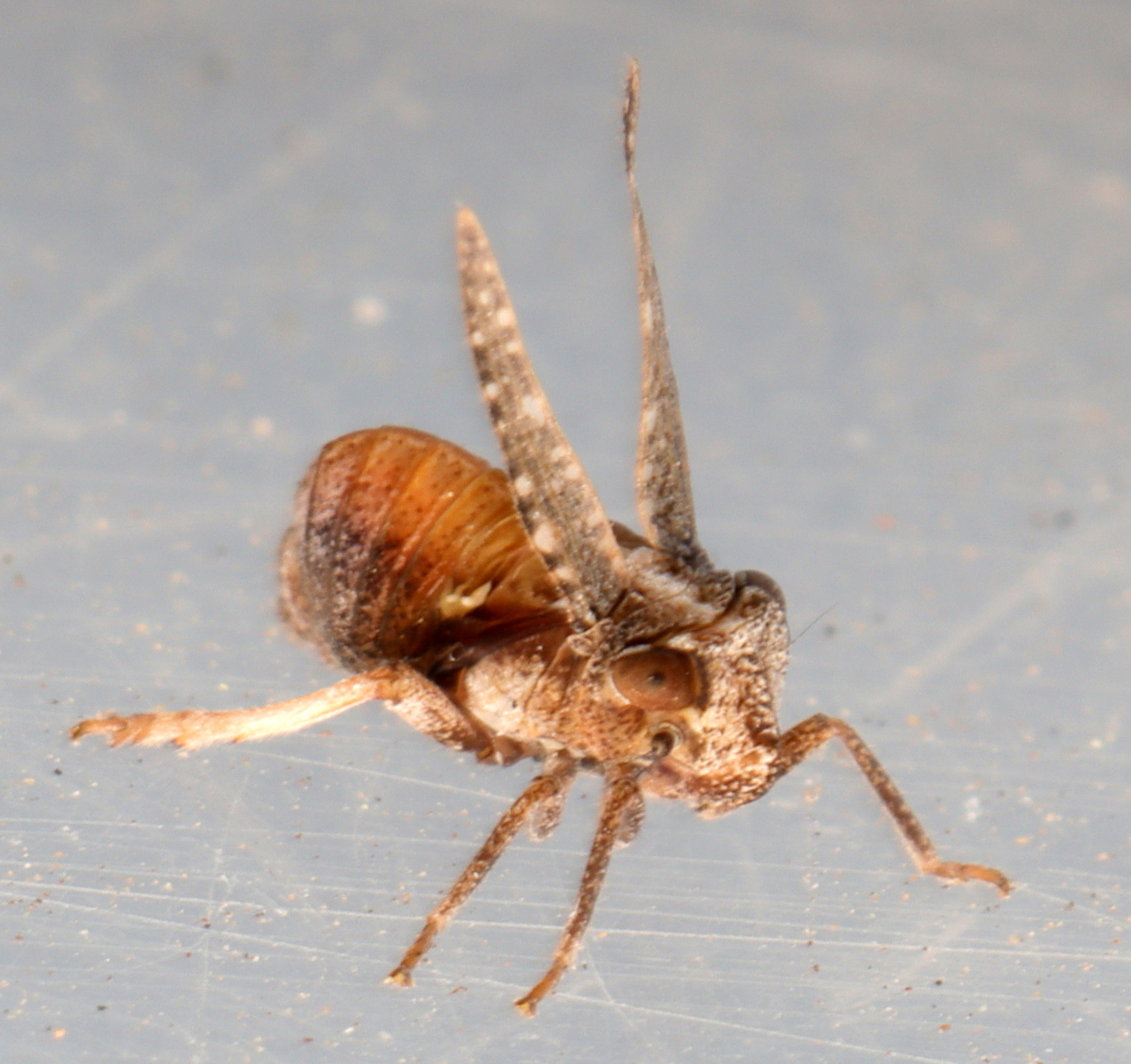
- Paragamergomorphus longiceps

Scientific classification
- Kingdom: Animalia
- Phylum: Arthropoda
- Class: Insecta
- Order: Hemiptera
- Suborder: Auchenorrhyncha
- Infraorder: Fulgoromorpha
- Family: Tropiduchidae
- Subfamily: Elicinae
- Tribe: Elicini; Melichar, 1915

Synonyms
- Gaetuliini Fennah, 1978

= Elicini =

Tribe of true bugs

The Elicini (synonym Gaetuliini) are a tribe of planthoppers in the family Tropiduchidae. The type genus is Elica.

== Genera ==
Fulgoromorpha Lists on the Web includes:

1. Acrisius Stål, 1862
2. Afroelfus Gnezdilov, 2012
3. Alleloplasis Waterhouse, 1839
4. Austris Szwedo & Stroinski, 2010
5. Bambomada Gnezdilov & Bourgoin, 2015
6. Bolitropis Gnezdilov & Bourgoin, 2015
7. Busas Jacobi, 1909
8. Conna Walker, 1856
9. Connelicita Wang & Bourgoin
10. †Dakrutulia Szwedo, 2019
11. Danepteryx Uhler, 1889
12. Dictyobia Uhler, 1889
13. Dictyonia Uhler, 1889
14. Dictyonissus Uhler, 1876
15. Dictyssa Melichar, 1906
16. Dictyssonia Ball, 1936
17. Dyctidea Uhler, 1889
18. Elica - monotypic Elica latipennis Walker, 1857
19. Exphora Signoret, 1860
20. Gaetulia Stål, 1864
21. Gamergomorphus Melichar, 1906
22. Gamergus Stål, 1859
23. Indogaetulia Schmidt, 1919
24. Johannesburgia Distant, 1907
25. Laberia Stål, 1866
26. Misodema Melichar, 1907
27. Neaethus Stål, 1861
28. Nubithia Stål, 1859<
29. Nurunderia Distant, 1909
30. Osbornia Ball, 1910
31. Paragamergomorphus Synave, 1956
32. Paralasonia Muir, 1924
33. Pucina Stål, 1866
34. Riancia Signoret, 1860
35. Salona Stål, 1866
36. Selamorpha Campodonico, 2018
37. †Senogaetulia Szwedo, 2019
38. †Tritophania Jacobi, 1938
