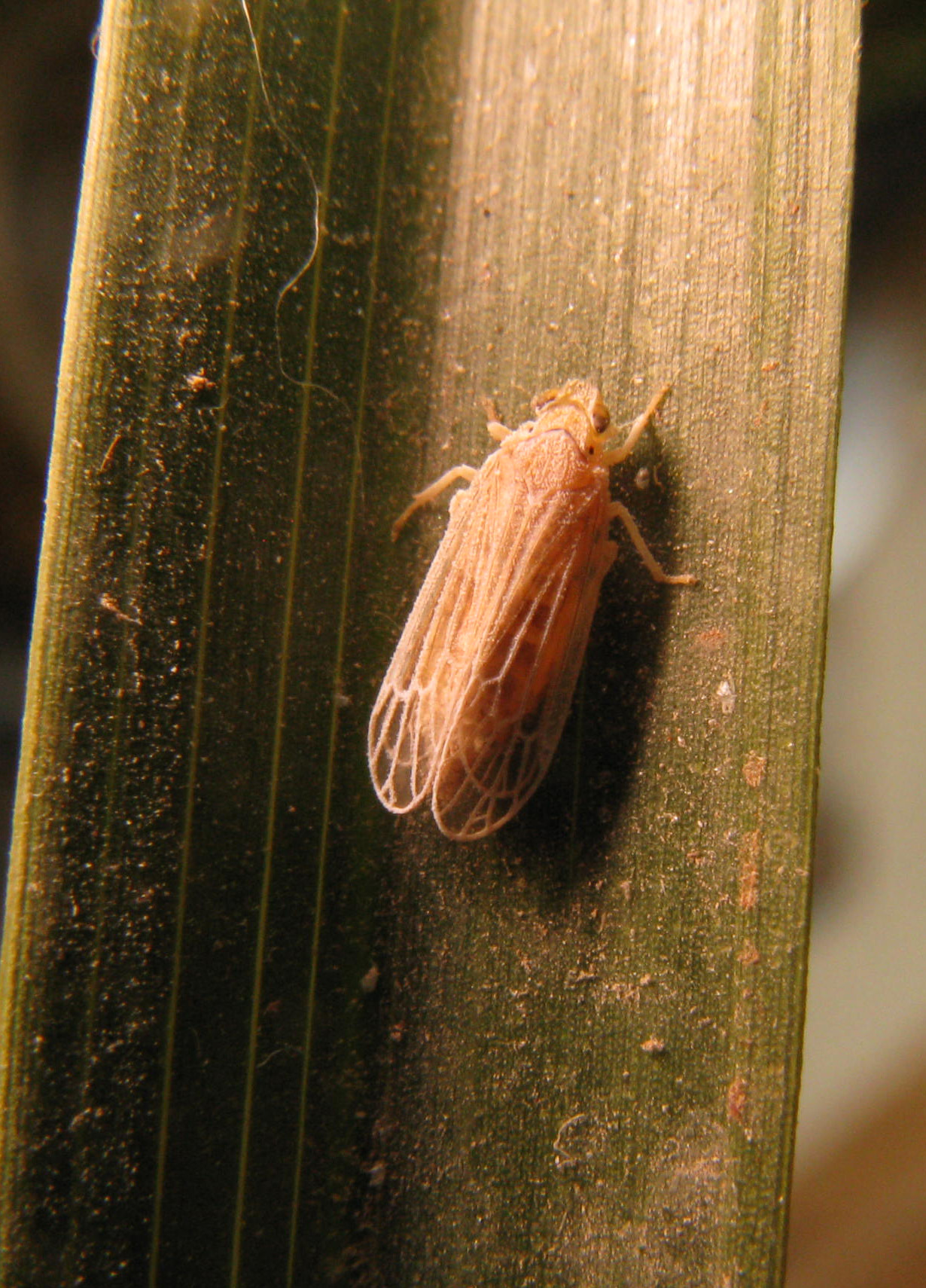
- Ommatissus lybicus

Scientific classification
- Kingdom: Animalia
- Phylum: Arthropoda
- Class: Insecta
- Order: Hemiptera
- Suborder: Auchenorrhyncha
- Infraorder: Fulgoromorpha
- Family: Tropiduchidae
- Genus: Ommatissus
- Species: O. lybicus

Binomial name
- Ommatissus lybicus de Bergevin, 1930

= Ommatissus lybicus =

Species of insect

Ommatissus lybicus is a species of planthoppers in the subfamily Tropiduchinae, recorded from Libya through the Middle East to Pakistan.

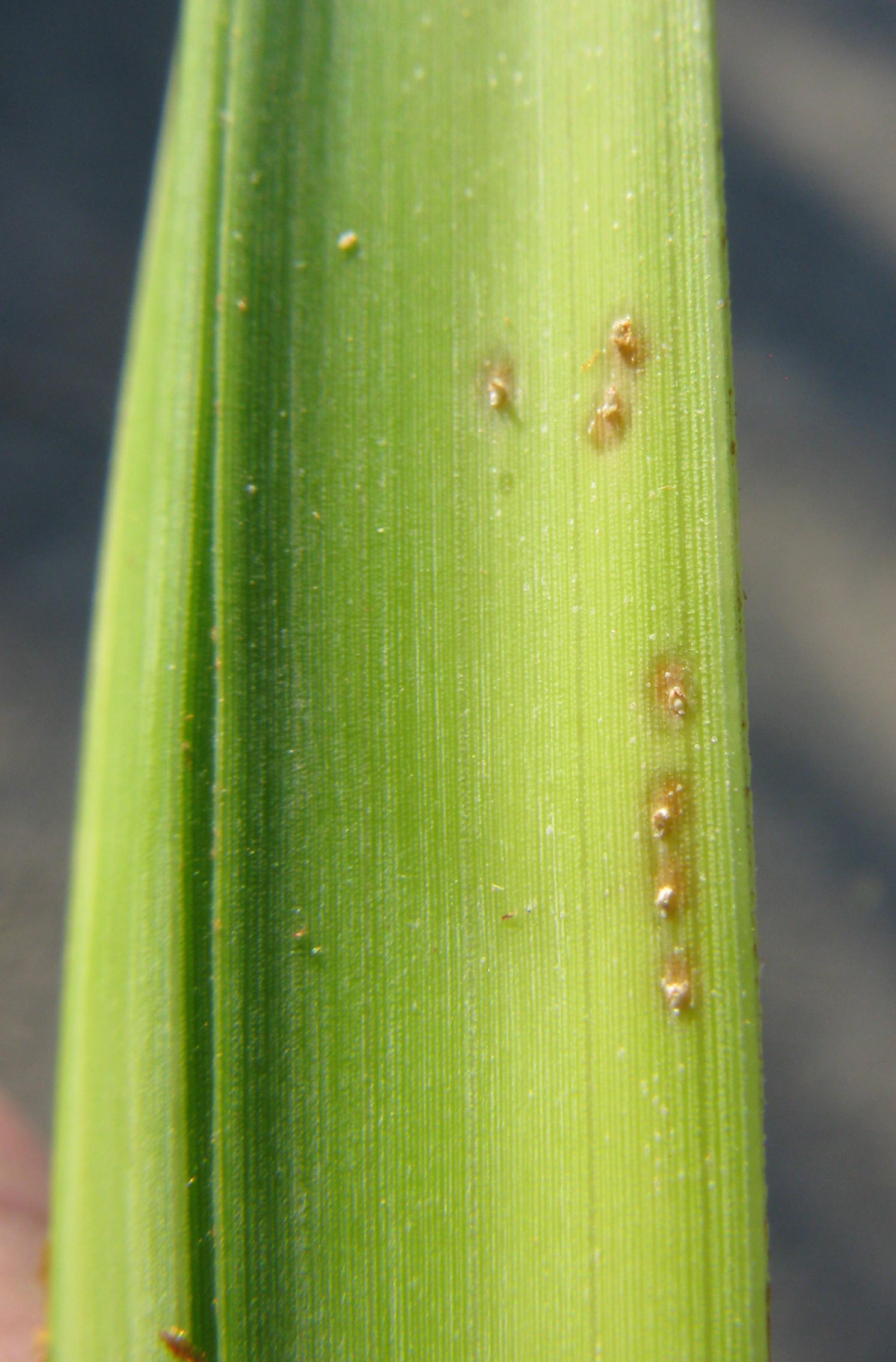
O. lybicus eggs on date palm.

== Pest status ==
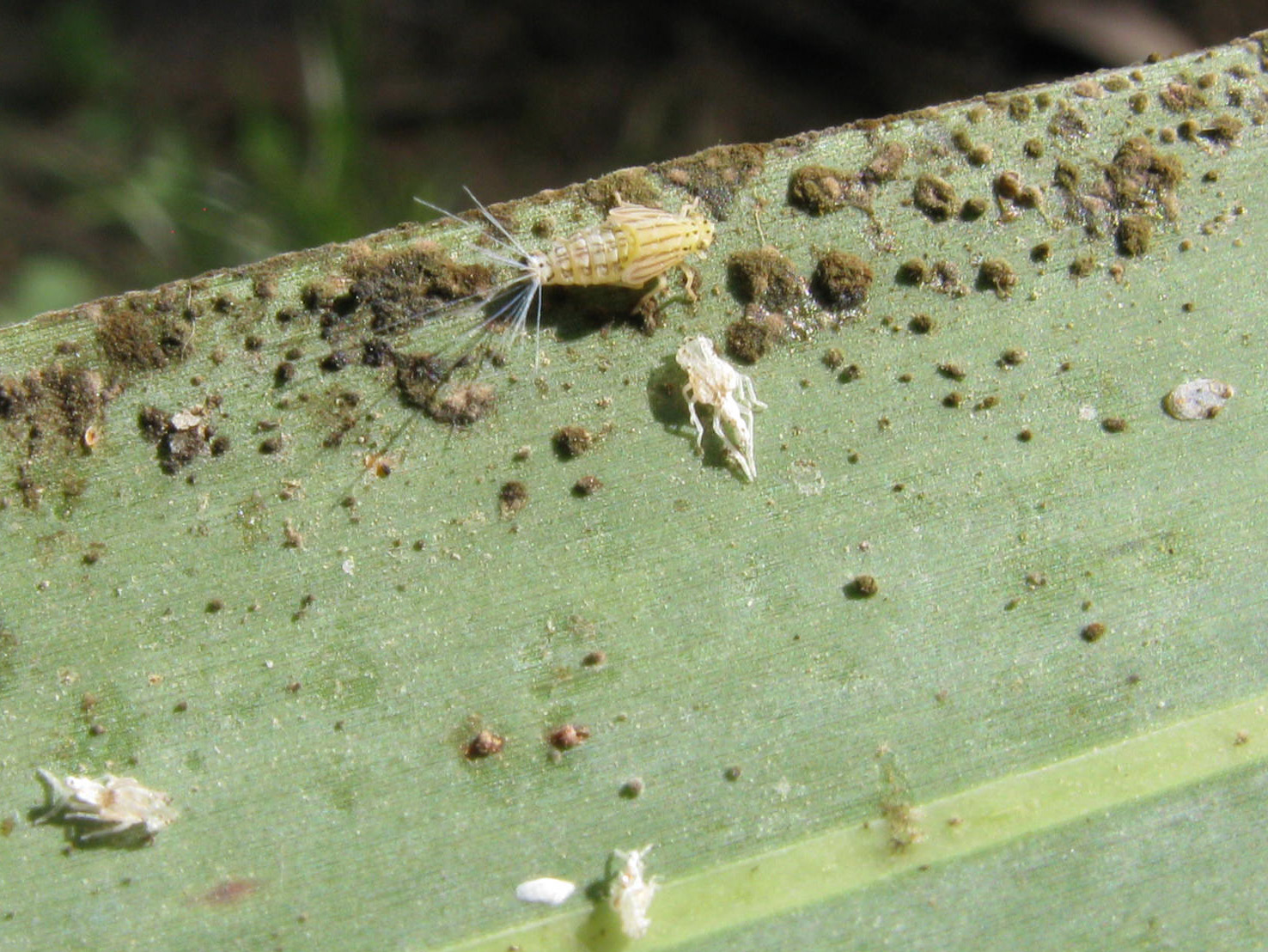
Sooty mould, nymph and larval cuticle of O. lybicus - taken on date palm in Oman

Ommatissus lybicus may be known as the dubas bug or date palm hopper and is a significant pest of date palms: with sap sucking resulting in sooty mould formation on leaves.
