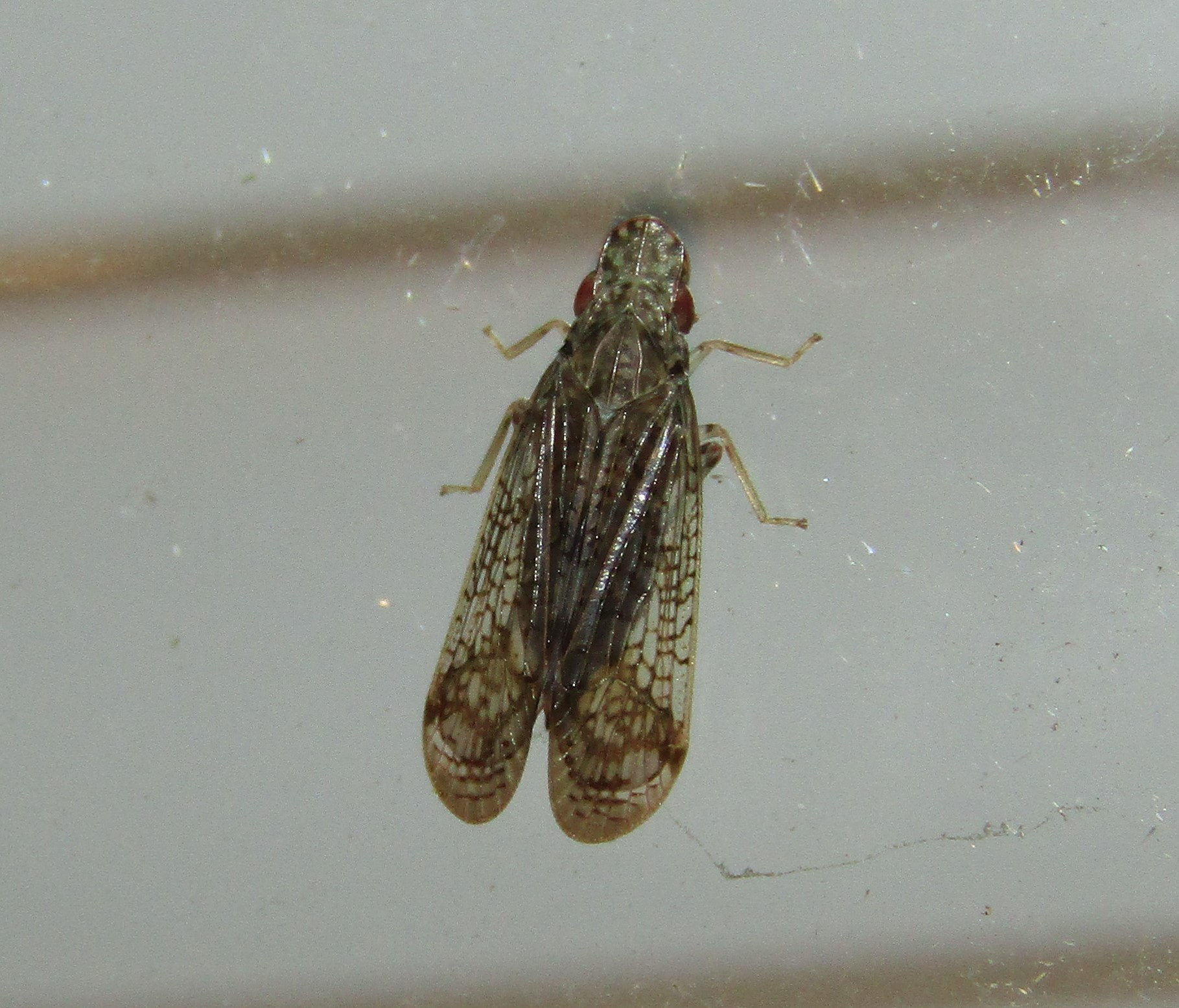
- Pelitropis rotulata

Scientific classification
- Domain: Eukaryota
- Kingdom: Animalia
- Phylum: Arthropoda
- Class: Insecta
- Order: Hemiptera
- Suborder: Auchenorrhyncha
- Infraorder: Fulgoromorpha
- Family: Tropiduchidae
- Subfamily: Tropiduchinae
- Tribe: Tangiini; Melichar, 1914

= Tangiini =

Tribe of true bugs

Tangiini is a tribe of tropiduchid planthoppers in the subfamily Tropiduchinae. There are at least 30 described species in Tangiini, from the Americas with several genera apparently restricted to the Caribbean.

== Genera ==
Fulgoromorpha Lists on the Web includes two subtribes:

- Neotangiina Fennah, 1982
1. Aripoa Fennah, 1945
2. Dictyotangia Fennah, 1945
3. Dioxyomus Fennah, 1945
4. Neotangia Melichar, 1914
5. Pelitropis Van Duzee, 1908
6. Tangidia Uhler, 1895
- Tangiina Melichar, 1914
1. Ladella Stål, 1859
2. Ladellodes Fennah, 1965
3. Tangella Metcalf & Bruner, 1930
4. Tangia (planthopper) Stål, 1859
