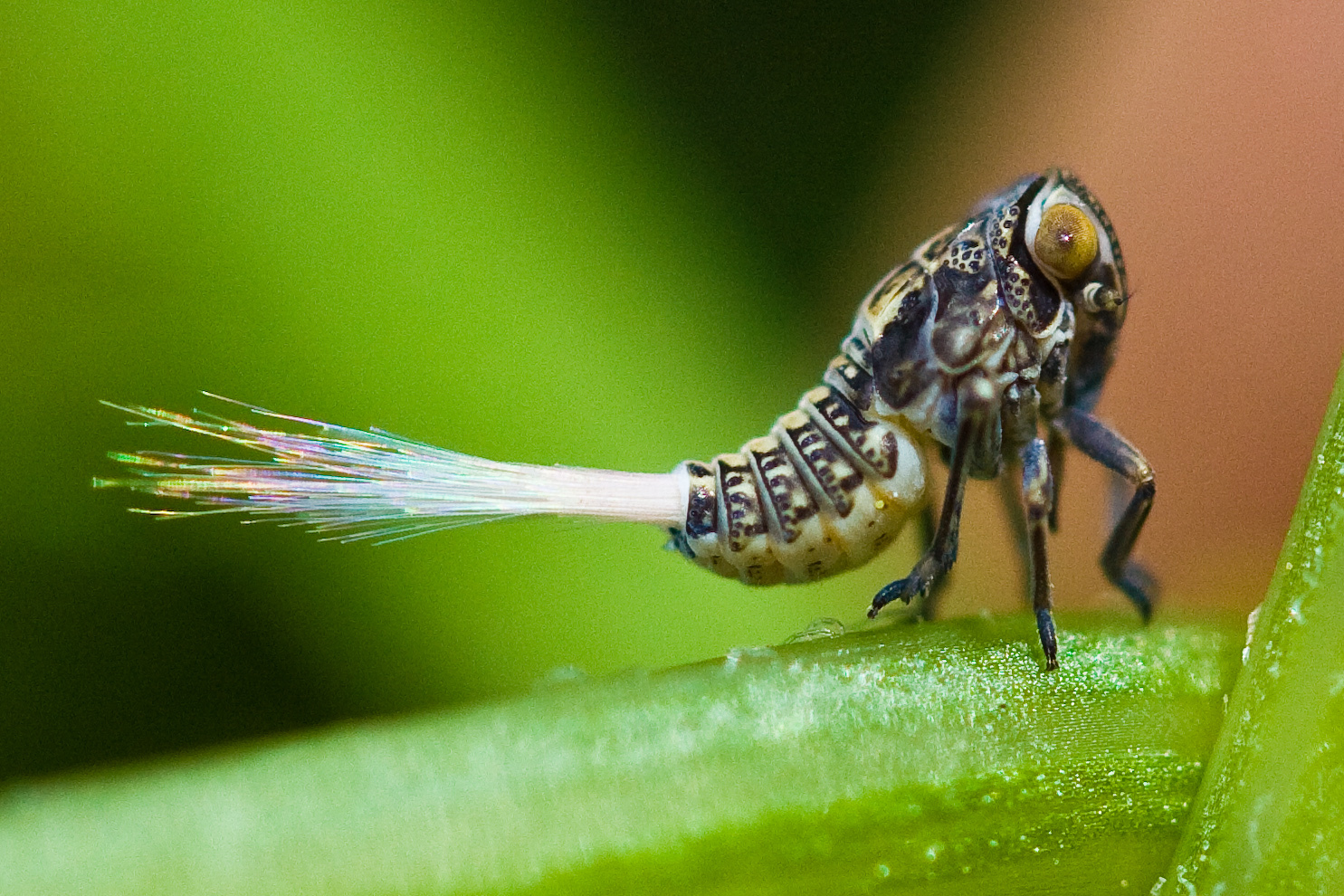

Scientific classification
- Domain: Eukaryota
- Kingdom: Animalia
- Phylum: Arthropoda
- Class: Insecta
- Order: Hemiptera
- Suborder: Auchenorrhyncha
- Infraorder: Fulgoromorpha
- Family: Tropiduchidae
- Genus: Danepteryx
- Species: D. barbarae

Binomial name
- Danepteryx barbarae Kirkaldy, 1908

= Danepteryx barbarae =

Species of true bug

Danepteryx barbarae is a species of tropiduchid planthopper in the family Tropiduchidae. It is found in North America.
