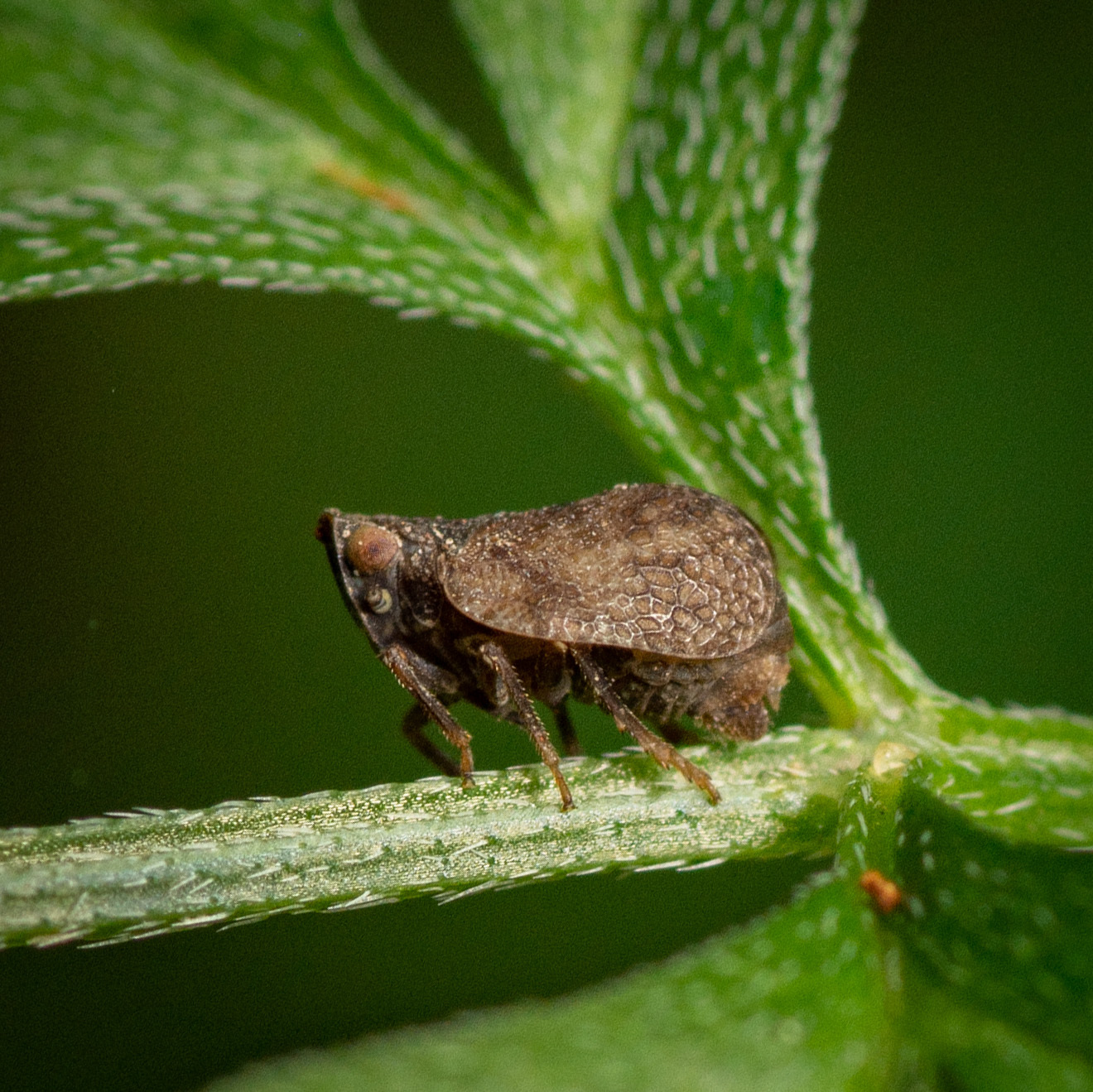

Scientific classification
- Kingdom: Animalia
- Phylum: Arthropoda
- Class: Insecta
- Order: Hemiptera
- Suborder: Auchenorrhyncha
- Infraorder: Fulgoromorpha
- Family: Tropiduchidae
- Genus: Misodema
- Species: M. reticulata

Binomial name
- Misodema reticulata (Melichar, 1906)

= Misodema reticulata =

Species of true bug

Misodema reticulata is a species of tropiduchid planthopper in the family Tropiduchidae. It is found in North America.
