= Osbornia cornuta =

Scientific classification
- Domain: Eukaryota
- Kingdom: Animalia
- Phylum: Arthropoda
- Class: Insecta
- Order: Hemiptera
- Suborder: Auchenorrhyncha
- Infraorder: Fulgoromorpha
- Family: Tropiduchidae
- Genus: Osbornia
- Species: O. cornuta

Binomial name
- Osbornia cornuta Ball, 1910

Species of true bug

Osbornia cornuta is a species of tropiduchid planthopper in the family Tropiduchidae. It is found in North America.
