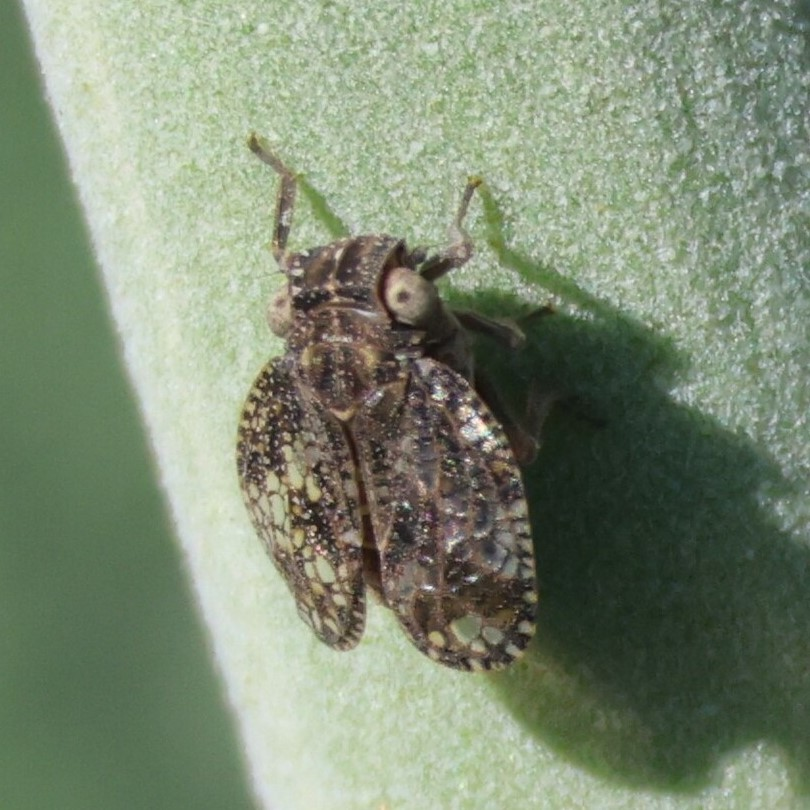

Scientific classification
- Kingdom: Animalia
- Phylum: Arthropoda
- Clade: Pancrustacea
- Class: Insecta
- Order: Hemiptera
- Suborder: Auchenorrhyncha
- Infraorder: Fulgoromorpha
- Family: Tropiduchidae
- Genus: Dictyobia
- Species: D. semivitrea

Binomial name
- Dictyobia semivitrea (Provancher, 1889)

= Dictyobia semivitrea =

Species of true bug

Dictyobia semivitrea is a species of tropiduchid planthopper in the family Tropiduchidae. It is found in North America.
