= Dictyobia atra =

Scientific classification
- Kingdom: Animalia
- Phylum: Arthropoda
- Class: Insecta
- Order: Hemiptera
- Suborder: Auchenorrhyncha
- Infraorder: Fulgoromorpha
- Family: Tropiduchidae
- Genus: Dictyobia
- Species: D. atra

Binomial name
- Dictyobia atra Van Duzee, 1914

Species of true bug

Dictyobia atra is a species of tropiduchid planthopper in the family Tropiduchidae. It is found in North America.
