= Osbornia arborea =

Scientific classification
- Domain: Eukaryota
- Kingdom: Animalia
- Phylum: Arthropoda
- Class: Insecta
- Order: Hemiptera
- Suborder: Auchenorrhyncha
- Infraorder: Fulgoromorpha
- Family: Tropiduchidae
- Genus: Osbornia
- Species: O. arborea

Binomial name
- Osbornia arborea Ball, 1935

Species of true bug

Osbornia arborea is a species of tropiduchid planthopper in the family Tropiduchidae. It is found in North America.

== Subspecies ==
These two subspecies belong to the species Osbornia arborea:

- Osbornia arborea arborea Ball, 1935
- Osbornia arborea fusca Doering, 1940
