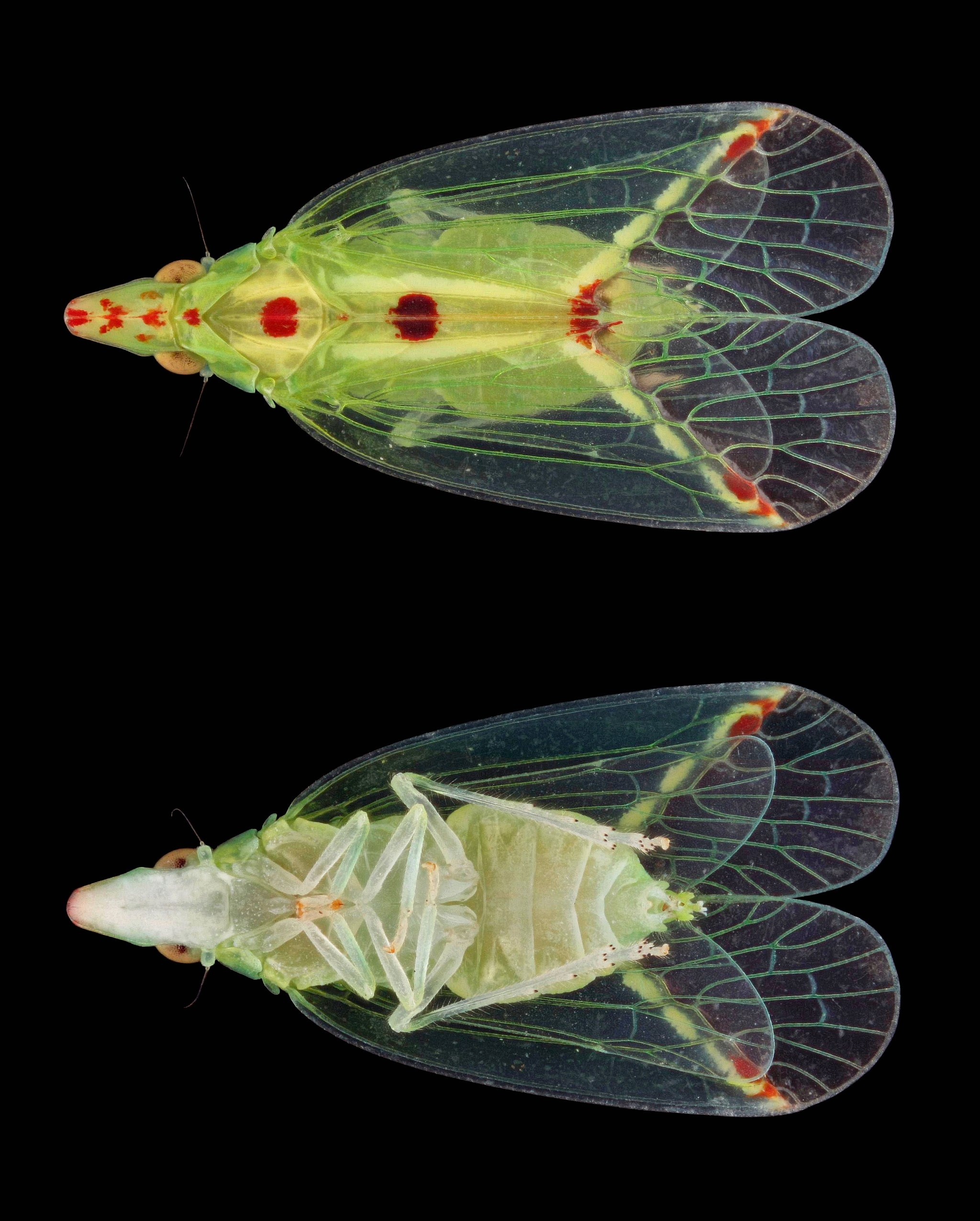
- Tambinia sexmaculata

Scientific classification
- Kingdom: Animalia
- Phylum: Arthropoda
- Clade: Pancrustacea
- Class: Insecta
- Order: Hemiptera
- Suborder: Auchenorrhyncha
- Infraorder: Fulgoromorpha
- Superfamily: Fulgoroidea
- Family: Tropiduchidae
- Subfamily: Tropiduchinae; Stål, 1866

Diversity
- at least 105 genera

= Tropiduchinae =

Subfamily of true bugs

Tropiduchinae is a subfamily of tropiduchid planthoppers in the family Tropiduchidae.

== Tribes and Selected Genera ==
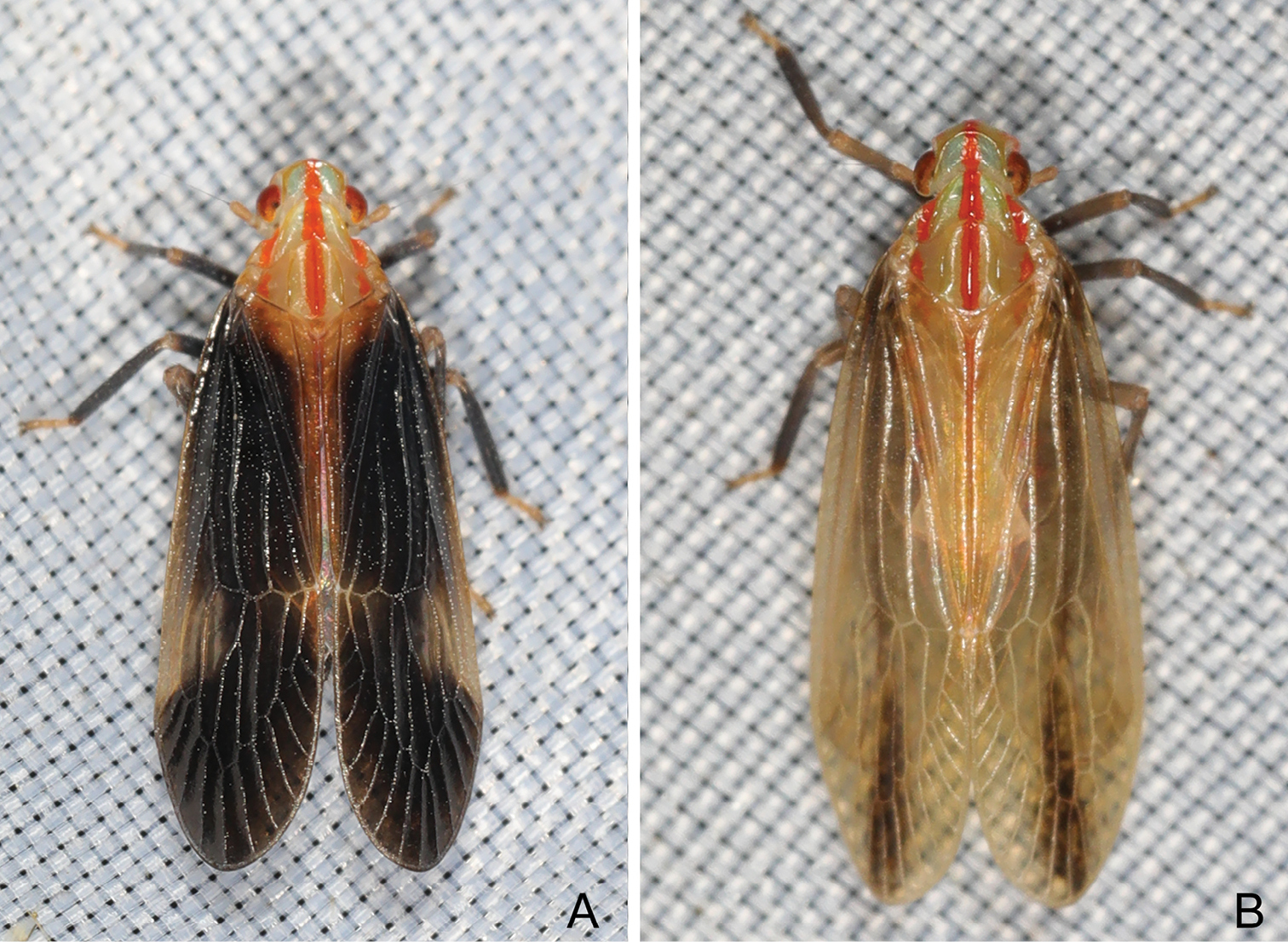
Catullioides rubrolineata (Catulliini)

Fulgoromorpha Lists On the Web lists the following:

- Alcestini Melichar, 1914
1. Alcestis (planthopper) Stål, 1862
2. Alcumena Schmidt, 1932
3. Alphesiboea (planthopper) Schmidt, 1932
- Catulliini Melichar, 1914
1. Barunoides Distant, 1912
2. Catullia Stål, 1870
3. Catulliaria Muir, 1931
4. †Catulliastites Szwedo, 2019
5. Catullioides Bierman, 1910
6. Eodryas Kirkaldy, 1907
7. Numicia Stål, 1866
- Chrysopuchini Gnezdilov, 2013
1. Chrysopuchus – monotypic C. nigrolineatus Gnezdilov, 2013
- Cixiopsini Fennah, 1982
1. Caffrommatissus Fennah, 1967
2. Cixiopsis Matsumura, 1900
3. Duriopsis Melichar, 1906
4. Padanda Distant, 1906
5. Zema Fennah, 1956
- Cyphoceratopini Fennah, 1945
1. Achilorma Metcalf & Bruner, 1930
2. Amaclardea Muir, 1931
3. Amapala (planthopper) Melichar, 1914
4. Arenasella Schmidt, 1932
5. Chasmacephala Fennah, 1945
6. Colgorma Kirkaldy, 1904
7. Cyphoceratops Uhler, 1901
8. Dichoneura Lethierry, 1890
9. Grynia Stål, 1862
10. Neorudia Fennah, 1945
11. Parahydriena Muir, 1924
12. Tangiopsis Uhler, 1901
13. Tangyria Uhler, 1901
14. Ubis Fennah, 1945

=== Tribes E-R ===
- †Emilianini Shcherbakov, 2006
  - Emiliana Shcherbakov, 2006: monotypic - E. alexandri
- Eporini Fennah, 1982
1. Clardeina Fennah, 1982
2. Eporina Fennah, 1982
- Eutropistini Kirkaldy, 1906
1. Duriina Fennah, 1982
2. Eutropistina Kirkaldy, 1906
3. Kazeruniina Dlabola, 1974
- Isporisini Fennah, 1982
1. Eilithyia Distant, 1912
2. Isporisa Walker, 1857
3. Isporisella Baker, 1927
4. Sogana Matsumura, 1914
- †Jantaritambiini Szwedo, 2000
- Neommatissini Fennah, 1982
1. Neommatissus Muir, 1913
2. Paruzelia Melichar, 1903
3. Teramnon Fennah, 1969
- Paricanini Melichar, 1914
1. Leusaba Walker, 1857
2. Lukabales Stroinski & Szwedo, 2015
3. Paricana Walker, 1857
4. Paricanoides Liang, 2003
5. †Seeteascanopia Bourgoin & Wang, 2019
6. Stacota Stål, 1859
- Remosini Fennah, 1982
1. Monopsis (planthopper) Spinola, 1839
2. Neurotmeta Guérin-Méneville, 1856
3. Pseudotangia Metcalf, 1938
4. Remosa Distant, 1906
5. Rotunosa Distant, 1906
6. Vanuoides Metcalf, 1938

=== Tribes T ===
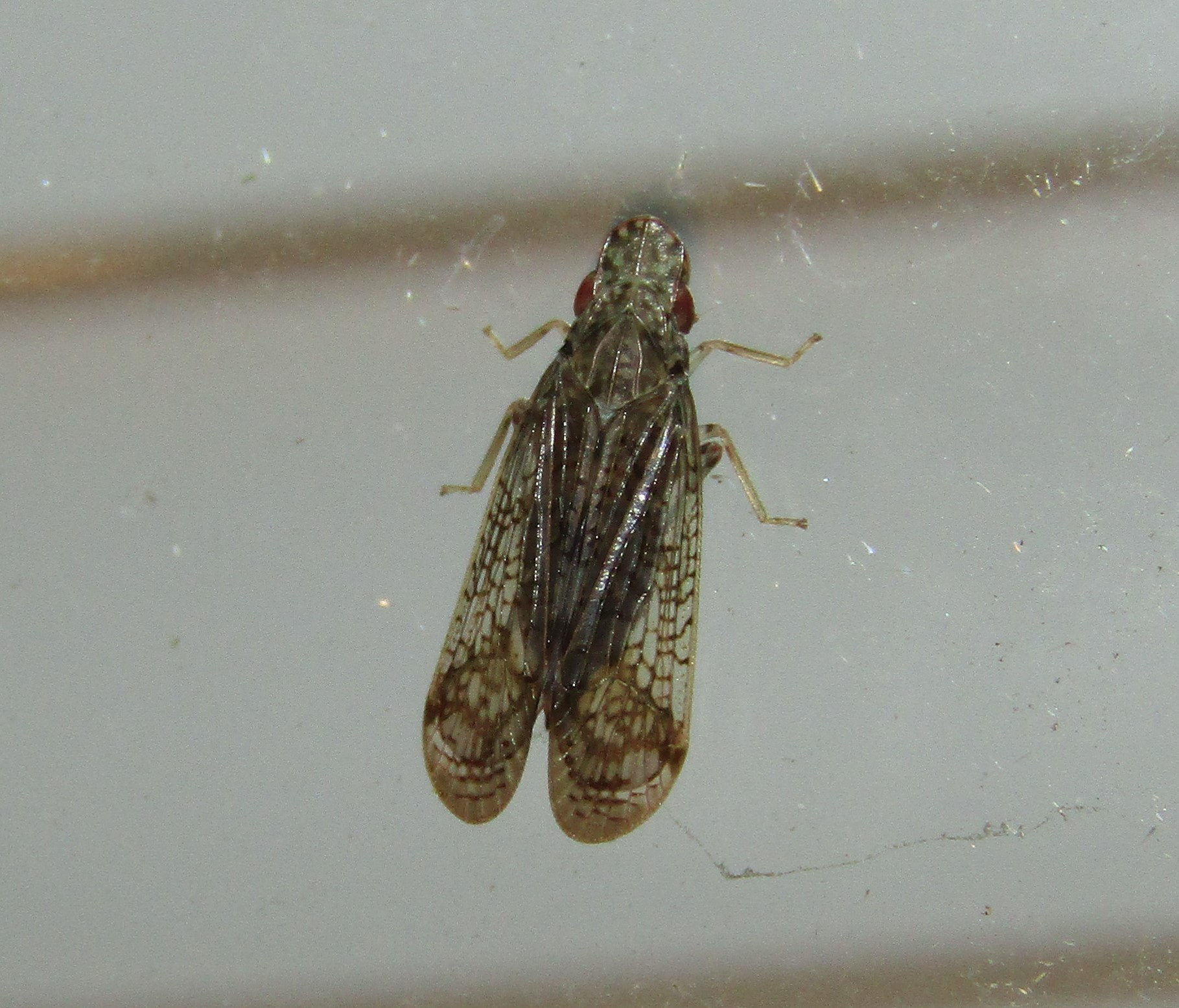
Pelitropis rotulata (Tangiini)

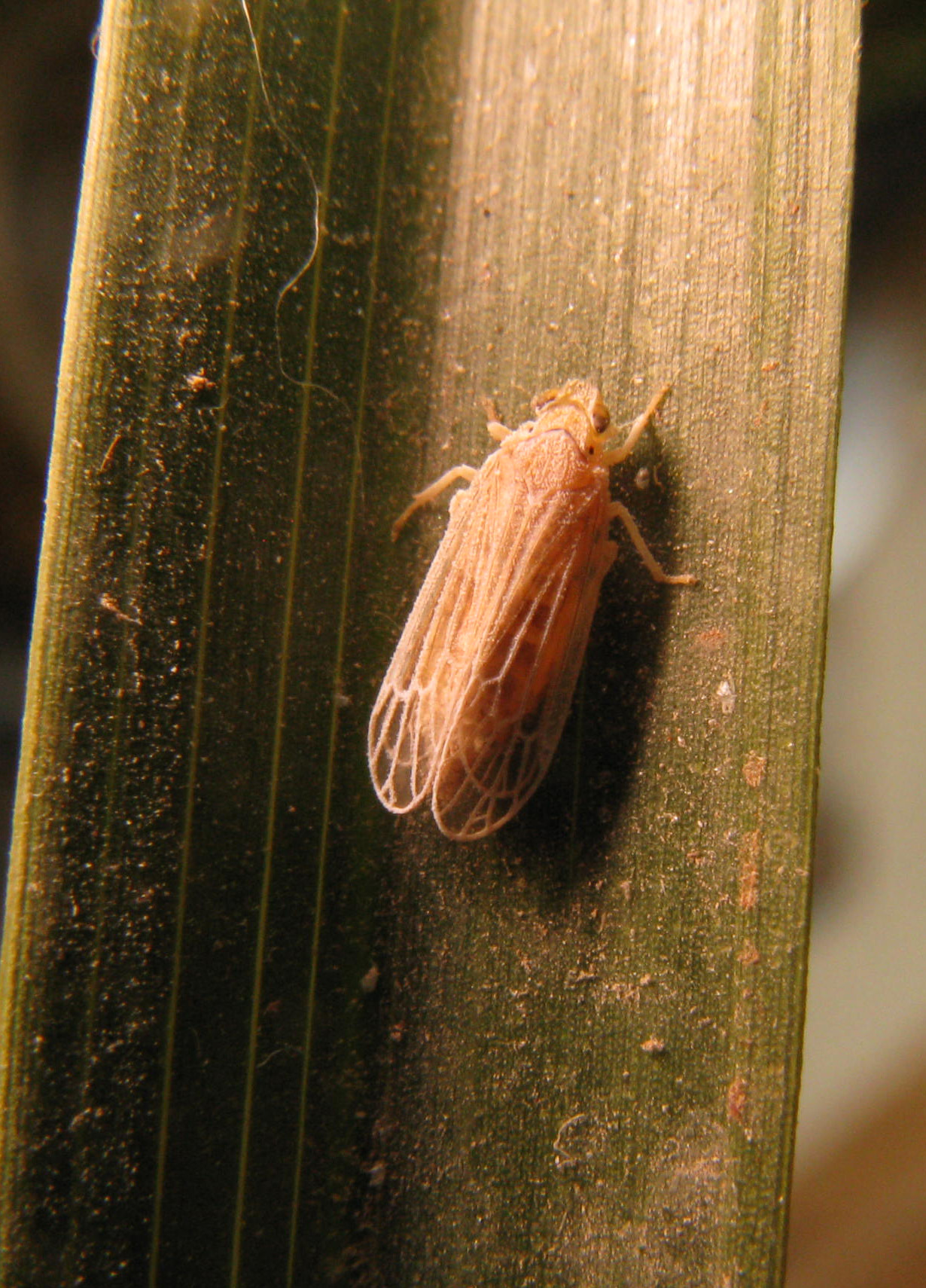
Ommatissus lybicus (Trypetimorphini)

- Tambiniini Kirkaldy, 1907
  - Tambinia Stål, 1859
  - Garumna Melichar, 1914
- Tangiini Melichar, 1914
  - subtribe Neotangiina Fennah, 1982
    - Pelitropis Van Duzee, 1908
  - subtribe Tangiina Melichar, 1914
    - Tangia (planthopper) Stål, 1859
- Trienopini Fennah, 1954
1. Fritzruehlia Schmidt, 1924
2. Ingoma Fennah, 1954
3. Neotylana Distant, 1909
4. Togoda Melichar, 1906
5. Trienopa Signoret, 1860
- Tropiduchini Stål, 1866
  - Tropiduchus Stål, 1854
- Trypetimorphini Melichar, 1914
  - Ommatissus Fieber, 1875
  - Trypetimorpha Costa, 1862
- Turneriolini Fennah, 1982
1. Stenoconchyoptera Muir, 1931
2. Turneriola China, 1923
