= Ubi =

Ubi or UBI may refer to:

== Businesses and organizations ==
=== Educational ===
- Brazilian Union for Interlingua (Portuguese: União Brasileira pro Interlingua)
- University of Beira Interior, Covilhã, Portugal
- United Bicycle Institute, Oregon, United States
- United Business Institutes, Brussels, Belgium

=== Financial ===
- UBI Banca, Italy, 2007–2021
- Union Bank of India, formed 1919
- United Bank of India formed 1950

=== Other businesses ===
- Ubisoft, a video game publisher and developer (Euronext ticker: UBI)
- United Barcode Industries, a Swedish firm acquired by Intermec

== Finance ==
- Universal basic income, an unconditional, non-means tested social dividend
- Usage-based insurance for vehicles

== People ==
- Ubii, a Germanic tribe allied with Julius Caesar
- Ubi, member of rap duo Ces Cru
- Ubi Dwyer (1933–2001), founder of the Windsor Free Festival

== Places ==
- Kampong Ubi or Ubi Estate, Singapore
- Upu, a historic region around Damascus (alternatively transliterated Ubi)

== Other uses ==
- Ubi language, spoken in central Chad
- Unsorted Block Images, for flash memory devices

== See also ==
- Ubis (disambiguation)
- Dioscorea alata (ubi in Malayo-Polynesian languages), a vegetable
- Oobi, a children's television series, 2000–2005
