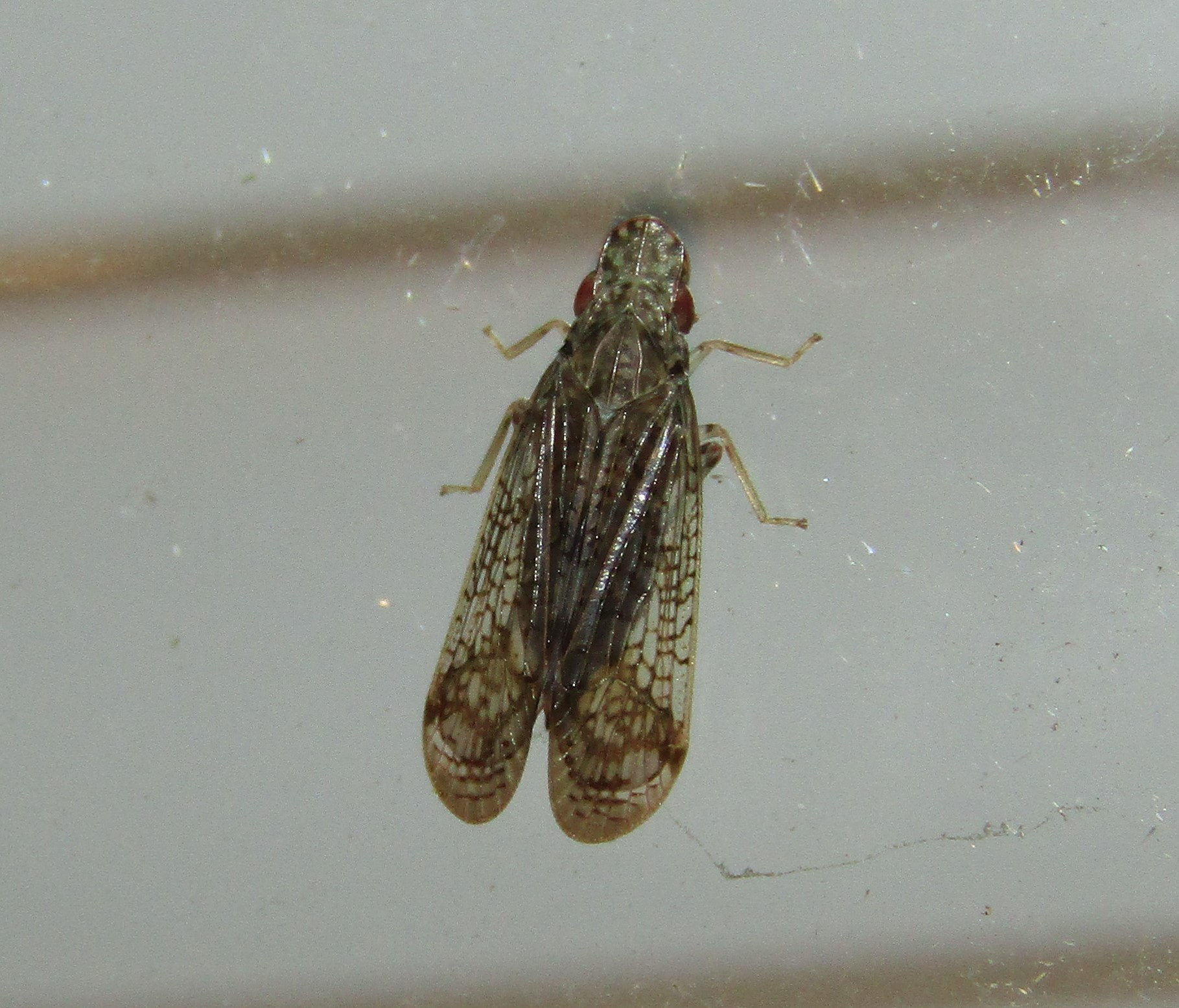

Scientific classification
- Kingdom: Animalia
- Phylum: Arthropoda
- Class: Insecta
- Order: Hemiptera
- Suborder: Auchenorrhyncha
- Infraorder: Fulgoromorpha
- Family: Tropiduchidae
- Genus: Pelitropis
- Species: P. rotulata

Binomial name
- Pelitropis rotulata Van Duzee, 1908

= Pelitropis rotulata =

Species of true bug

Pelitropis rotulata is a species of tropiduchid planthopper in the family Tropiduchidae. It is found in the Caribbean Sea and North America.
