= Elica latipennis =

Scientific classification
- Kingdom: Animalia
- Phylum: Arthropoda
- Clade: Pancrustacea
- Class: Insecta
- Order: Hemiptera
- Suborder: Auchenorrhyncha
- Infraorder: Fulgoromorpha
- Family: Tropiduchidae
- Subfamily: Elicinae
- Tribe: Elicini
- Genus: Elica; Walker, 1856
- Species: E. latipennis

Binomial name
- Elica latipennis Walker, 1857

Genus of planthopper

External image
- Images at iNaturalist

Elica is a monotypic genus of planthoppers containing the species Elica latipennis from Peninsular Malaysia.

== Taxonomy ==
Elica latipennis is placed in the family Tropiduchidae and was erected by Francis Walker in 1857. It is the type species in its genus, the subfamily Elicinae and tribe Elicini, according to Fulgoromorpha Lists on the Web.

== Description ==
Walker's original description for E. latipennis states that:

"Head conical, slightly ascending, with three ridges above; front lanceolate, tetragonal, with three ridges, the lateral pair curved, margins also ridged. Antennæ conical; bristle about twice the length of the preceding part. Prothorax very short. Mesothorax with three keels. Fore wings broad, with numerous transverse veinlets along the costa; discal areolets elongate towards the base of the wing; those exterior more numerous, short and generally hexagonal or pentagonal."
