= Tambiniini =

Scientific classification
- Domain: Eukaryota
- Kingdom: Animalia
- Phylum: Arthropoda
- Class: Insecta
- Order: Hemiptera
- Suborder: Auchenorrhyncha
- Infraorder: Fulgoromorpha
- Family: Tropiduchidae
- Subfamily: Tropiduchinae
- Tribe: Tambiniini; Kirkaldy, 1907

Genus of planthoppers

External image
- Images at iNaturalist

Tambiniini is a tribe of planthoppers in the subfamily Tropiduchinae, erected by George Kirkaldy in 1907. There are more than 60 species in genera mostly found in South- and South-East Asia, eastern Australia and the Pacific islands.

== Genera ==
Tambinia Stål, 1859 is the type genus, which was reviewed in 2011. Fulgoromorpha Lists on the Web includes:

1. Athestia Melichar, 1914
2. Biruga Fennah, 1944
3. Garumna Melichar, 1914
4. Garumnella Wang, Liang & Webb, 2009
5. Kallitambinia Muir, 1931
6. Kallitaxila Kirkaldy, 1901
7. Lanshu Yang, Yang & Wilson, 1989
8. Neotaxilana Synave, 1979
9. Neotaxilanoides Men & Qin, 2011
10. Nesotaxila Fennah, 1971
11. Ossoides Bierman, 1910
12. †Sognotela Szwedo, 2019
13. Sumbana Lallemand & Synave, 1953
14. Tambinia Stål, 1859
15. Tauropola Jacobi, 1944
