= Danepteryx manca =

Scientific classification
- Kingdom: Animalia
- Phylum: Arthropoda
- Class: Insecta
- Order: Hemiptera
- Suborder: Auchenorrhyncha
- Infraorder: Fulgoromorpha
- Family: Tropiduchidae
- Genus: Danepteryx
- Species: D. manca

Binomial name
- Danepteryx manca Uhler, 1889

Species of true bug

Danepteryx manca is a species of tropiduchid planthopper in the family Tropiduchidae. It is found in North America.
