= Dyctidea valida =

Scientific classification
- Domain: Eukaryota
- Kingdom: Animalia
- Phylum: Arthropoda
- Class: Insecta
- Order: Hemiptera
- Suborder: Auchenorrhyncha
- Infraorder: Fulgoromorpha
- Family: Tropiduchidae
- Genus: Dyctidea
- Species: D. valida

Binomial name
- Dyctidea valida Doering, 1940

Species of true bug

Dyctidea valida is a species of tropiduchid planthopper in the family Tropiduchidae. It is found in North America.
