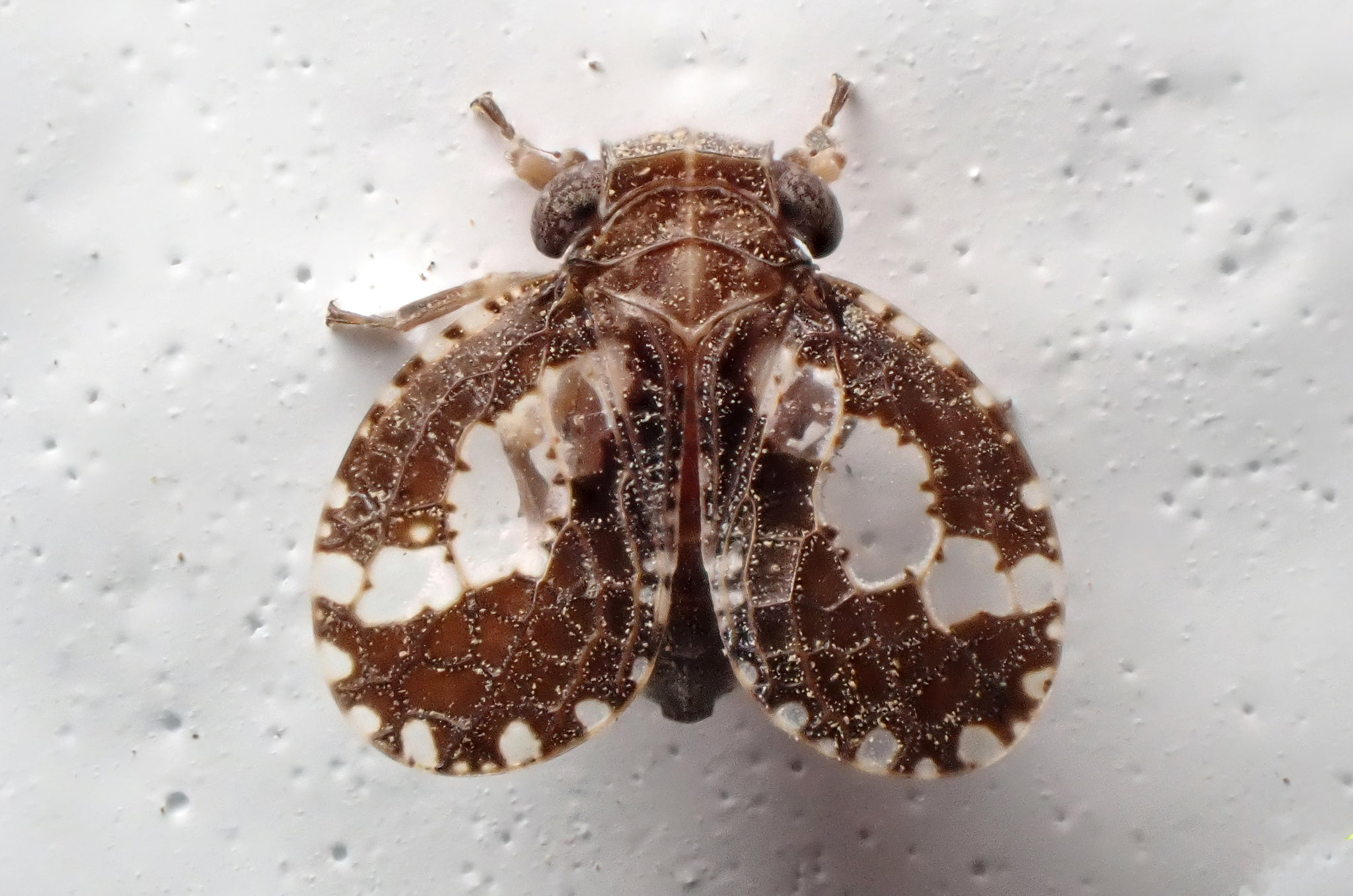

Scientific classification
- Kingdom: Animalia
- Phylum: Arthropoda
- Class: Insecta
- Order: Hemiptera
- Suborder: Auchenorrhyncha
- Infraorder: Fulgoromorpha
- Family: Tropiduchidae
- Genus: Dictyssa
- Species: D. obliqua

Binomial name
- Dictyssa obliqua Ball, 1910

= Dictyssa obliqua =

Species of true bug

Dictyssa obliqua is a species of tropiduchid planthopper in the family Tropiduchidae. It is found in Central America and North America.
