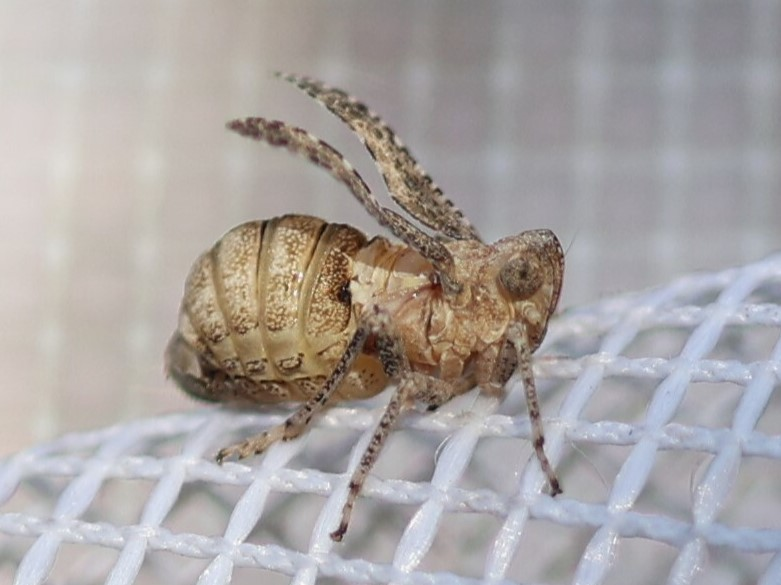

Scientific classification
- Kingdom: Animalia
- Phylum: Arthropoda
- Class: Insecta
- Order: Hemiptera
- Suborder: Auchenorrhyncha
- Infraorder: Fulgoromorpha
- Family: Tropiduchidae
- Genus: Danepteryx
- Species: D. robusta

Binomial name
- Danepteryx robusta Doering, 1940

= Danepteryx robusta =

Species of true bug

Danepteryx robusta is a species of planthopper in the family Tropiduchidae. It is found in North America.
