= Zema =

Scientific classification
- Kingdom: Animalia
- Phylum: Arthropoda
- Class: Insecta
- Order: Hemiptera
- Suborder: Auchenorrhyncha
- Infraorder: Fulgoromorpha
- Family: Tropiduchidae
- Subfamily: Tropiduchinae
- Tribe: Cixiopsini
- Genus: Zema; Fennah, 1956

Genus of planthoppers

External image
- Images at iNaturalist

Zema is a genus of Asian planthoppers in the subfamily Tropiduchinae and tribe Cixiopsini, erected by Ronald Fennah in 1956.

== Species ==
Fulgoromorpha Lists on the Web includes:

1. Zema gressitti Fennah, 1956 – type species
2. Zema montana Wang & Liang, 2007
