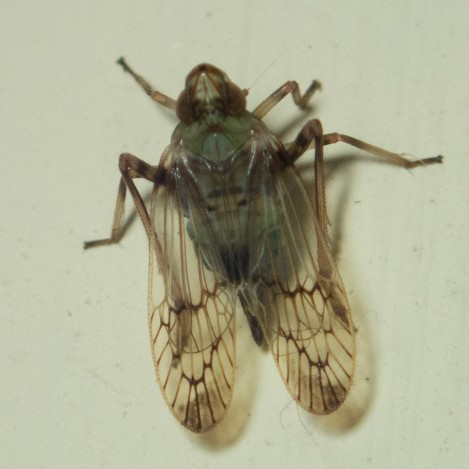
- Sogana chartieri

Scientific classification
- Kingdom: Animalia
- Phylum: Arthropoda
- Clade: Pancrustacea
- Class: Insecta
- Order: Hemiptera
- Suborder: Auchenorrhyncha
- Infraorder: Fulgoromorpha
- Family: Tropiduchidae
- Subfamily: Tropiduchinae
- Genus: Sogana; Matsumura (1914)

= Sogana =

Genus of insects

Sogana is a genus of Asian planthoppers in the subfamily Tropiduchinae and tribe Isporisini, erected by Shonen Matsumura in 1914.

== Species ==
Fulgoromorpha Lists on the Web includes:

- Sogana bachmana Constant & Pham, 2019
- Sogana baviana Constant & Pham, 2019
- Sogana chartieri Constant, 2019
- Sogana clara Liang & Wang, 2008
- Sogana condaoana Constant & Pham, 2013
- Sogana cucphuongana Constant & Pham, 2013
- Sogana cysana Constant & Pham, 2020
- Sogana extrema Melichar, 1914
- Sogana floreni Constant, 2010
- Sogana hopponis Matsumura, 1914 – type species
- Sogana longiceps Fennah, 1978
- Sogana pseudohopponis Liang & Wang, 2008
- Sogana robustocarina Liang & Wang, 2008
- Sogana stimulata Melichar, 1914
