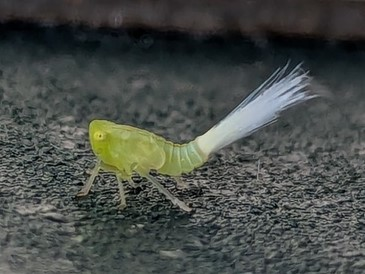

Scientific classification
- Kingdom: Animalia
- Phylum: Arthropoda
- Class: Insecta
- Order: Hemiptera
- Suborder: Auchenorrhyncha
- Infraorder: Fulgoromorpha
- Family: Tropiduchidae
- Genus: Dictyonissus
- Species: D. griphus

Binomial name
- Dictyonissus griphus Uhler, 1876

= Dictyonissus griphus =

Species of true bug

Dictyonissus griphus is a species of planthopper in the family Tropiduchidae. It is found in Central America and North America.
