= David Henry Bohm =

American cycle designer

David Henry Bohm (born November 4, 1968) is an American bicycle framebuilder and owner of Bohemian Bicycles.

== Early life and education ==
Bohm was born in Chicago, Illinois. At age 6, his family moved to Tucson, Arizona, where he spent his childhood.

He attended Colorado Rocky Mountain School, where he learned welding and silver smithing.

After high school, he attended college at Lake Forest College and the University of Arizona

== Bicycle racing career ==
Bohm had a brief career in Category 2 racing.

== Framebuilding career ==
Bohm began making bicycle frames in 1994. He is a graduate of United Bicycle Institute in Ashland, Oregon. The same year he founded Bohemian Bicycles.

Since that time, he has won numerous awards. Most recently, People's Choice and Best Tandem at the North American Handmade Bicycle Show in 2007. Bohm has been written up in such magazines as Triathlete, Dirt Rag, various German and English publications, auto magazine, Tandem-Recumbent magazine, and the Tucson Citizen newspaper.
