= United Bicycle Institute =

Private school in Oregon, United States

- Ashland, Jackson County, Oregon; United States

Information
- Established: 1981; 45 years ago
- Founder: Wayne Martin
- Website: bikeschool.com

United Bicycle Institute (UBI) is a private career school for bicycle mechanics in Ashland, Oregon, United States. The school offers one and two-week courses in addition to continuing education seminars. Licensed by the Oregon Higher Education Coordinating Commission, UBI educates veterans with VA education benefits, as well as traditional students ranging from home mechanics to experienced mechanics looking to certify or continue their education in more specialized avenues like wheel-building, suspension work.

Ron Sutphin, the current owner, has been an instructor since it was founded in 1981 by Wayne Martin.

In 2009, the institute opened a second campus in Portland offering the same curriculum as its campus in Ashland. In 2019, the Portland campus closed, and the school once again became housed under one roof in Southern Oregon. The campus features two mechanics classrooms with custom-designed workbenches and professional grade tools.

After graduation, the school offers graduates certificates of completion and certifications depending on the class and whether the student passes exams.

== Classes Offered ==
=== Bicycle Mechanics Classes ===
- Introduction to Bicycle Maintenance, 5 days
- Professional Repair & Shop Operation, 10 days
- Home Mechanic Introduction to Wheel Building and Maintenance, 1 day
- Home Mechanic Introduction to Hydraulic Brake Bleeding, 1 day
- Home Mechanic Introduction to Suspension Maintenance, 1 day

=== Advanced and Continuing Education Seminars ===
- Certified Suspension Technician, 3 days
- UBI/DT Swiss Certified Wheel Builder, 2 days
- FOX Master Tech Clinic, 1 day

== Prominent Alumni ==
- David Bohm, Bohemian Bicycles
