= Grynia =

Scientific classification
- Kingdom: Animalia
- Phylum: Arthropoda
- Clade: Pancrustacea
- Class: Insecta
- Order: Hemiptera
- Suborder: Auchenorrhyncha
- Infraorder: Fulgoromorpha
- Family: Tropiduchidae
- Genus: Grynia; Stål, 1862
- Species: G. nigricoxis

Binomial name
- Grynia nigricoxis Stål, 1862

Genus of insects

Grynia is a monotypic genus of African planthoppers in the subfamily Tropiduchinae and tribe Cyphoceratopini, erected by Carl Stål in 1862.

== Species ==
Fulgoromorpha Lists on the Web includes the single species: Grynia nigricoxis Stål, 1862.
