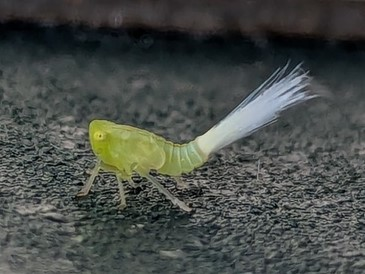
- Dictyonissus griphus

Scientific classification
- Kingdom: Animalia
- Phylum: Arthropoda
- Class: Insecta
- Order: Hemiptera
- Suborder: Auchenorrhyncha
- Infraorder: Fulgoromorpha
- Family: Tropiduchidae
- Tribe: Elicini
- Genus: Dictyonissus; Uhler, 1876

= Dictyonissus =

Genus of true bugs

Dictyonissus is a genus of tropiduchid planthoppers in the family Tropiduchidae. There are at least two described species in Dictyonissus.

== Species ==
These two species belong to the genus Dictyonissus:

- Dictyonissus griphus Uhler, 1876
- Dictyonissus nigropilosus Doering, 1939
