= Dictyobia =

Scientific classification
- Kingdom: Animalia
- Phylum: Arthropoda
- Class: Insecta
- Order: Hemiptera
- Suborder: Auchenorrhyncha
- Infraorder: Fulgoromorpha
- Family: Tropiduchidae
- Tribe: Elicini
- Genus: Dictyobia; Uhler, 1889

Genus of true bugs

Dictyobia is a genus of tropiduchid planthoppers in the family Tropiduchidae. There are at least four described species in Dictyobia.

== Species ==
These four species belong to the genus Dictyobia:

- Dictyobia atra Van Duzee, 1914
- Dictyobia combinata Ball, 1910
- Dictyobia semivitrea (Provancher, 1889)
- Dictyobia varia Doering, 1940
