= Bohemian Bicycles =

American bicycle manufacturer

Bohemian Bicycles, also known as Bohemian Custom Bicycles, is a bicycle manufacturer and framebuilding school in Tucson, Arizona. It makes handmade steel lugged frames. David Bohm started the business in 1994 and expanded to framebuilding in 2006. It has since received recognition from the North American Handmade Bicycle Association.
