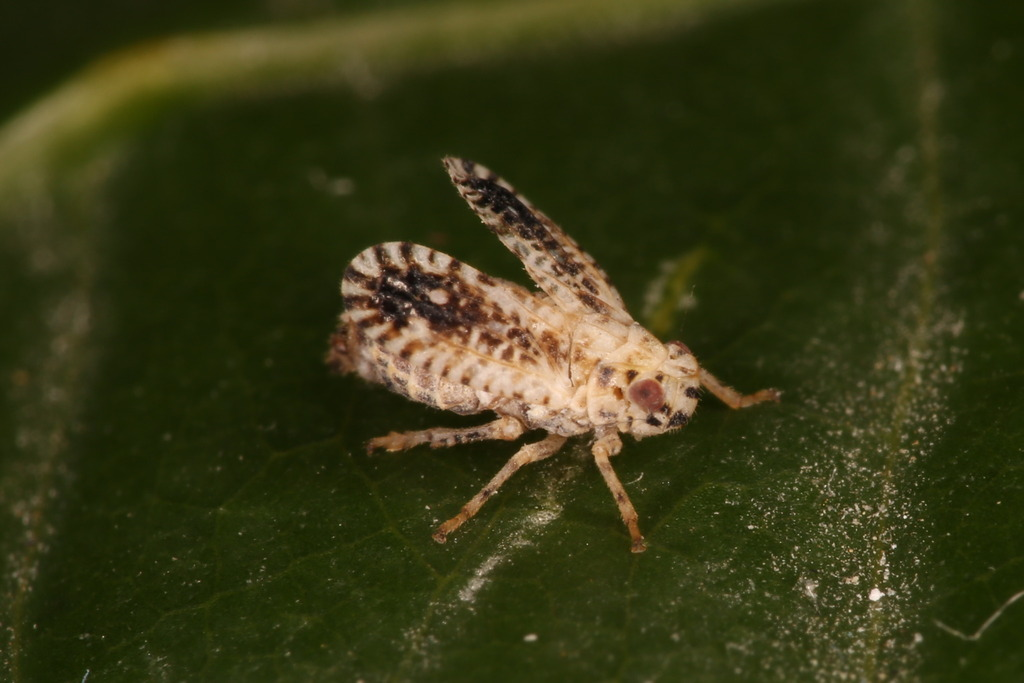
- Trypetimorpha occidentalis

Scientific classification
- Kingdom: Animalia
- Phylum: Arthropoda
- Class: Insecta
- Order: Hemiptera
- Suborder: Auchenorrhyncha
- Infraorder: Fulgoromorpha
- Family: Tropiduchidae
- Subfamily: Tropiduchinae
- Tribe: Trypetimorphini
- Genus: Trypetimorpha; Costa, 1862

Synonyms
- Trichoduchus Bierman, 1910

= Trypetimorpha =

Genus of insects

Trypetimorpha is a genus of bugs in the family Tropiduchidae; species are recorded from mainland Europe, Africa, Asia and Australia.

== Taxonomy ==
The genus was first described in 1862 by Achille Costa.

Trypetimorpha is the type genus of the small tribe Trypetimorphini (erected by Leopold Melichar in 1914). The other extant genus in this tribe is Ommatissus and the extinct genus †Reteotissus Szwedo, 2019 was found from Eocene strata in the Isle of Wight, off southern England.

== Species ==
Fulgoromorpha Lists on the Web includes:

1. Trypetimorpha aschei Huang & Bourgoin, 1993
2. Trypetimorpha biermani (Dammerman, 1910)
3. Trypetimorpha canopus Linnavuori, 1973
4. Trypetimorpha fenestrata Costa, 1862 - type species (mainland Europe, north Africa and the Middle East)
5. Trypetimorpha japonica Ishihara, 1954
6. Trypetimorpha occidentalis Huang & Bourgoin, 1993
7. Trypetimorpha sizhengi Huang & Bourgoin, 1993
8. Trypetimorpha wilsoni Huang & Bourgoin, 1993
