= Garumna =

Scientific classification
- Domain: Eukaryota
- Kingdom: Animalia
- Phylum: Arthropoda
- Class: Insecta
- Order: Hemiptera
- Suborder: Auchenorrhyncha
- Infraorder: Fulgoromorpha
- Family: Tropiduchidae
- Subfamily: Tropiduchinae
- Tribe: Tambiniini
- Genus: Garumna; Melichar, 1914

Synonyms
- Paragarumna Muir, 1931

Genus of insects

Garumna is a genus of Asian planthoppers in the family Tropiduchidae and tribe Tambiniini, erected by Leopold Melichar in 1914.

== Species ==
The following have been recorded from Thailand and western Malesia:

1. Garumna lepida Melichar, 1914 - type species
2. Garumna melichari Baker, 1927
3. Garumna pseudolepida (Muir, 1931)
