= Pelitropis =

Scientific classification
- Kingdom: Animalia
- Phylum: Arthropoda
- Class: Insecta
- Order: Hemiptera
- Suborder: Auchenorrhyncha
- Infraorder: Fulgoromorpha
- Family: Tropiduchidae
- Tribe: Tangiini
- Genus: Pelitropis; Van Duzee, 1908

Genus of true bugs

Pelitropis is a genus of tropiduchid planthoppers in the family of Tropiduchidae. There are about five described species in Pelitropis.

== Species ==
These four species belong to the genus Pelitropis:

- Pelitropis cazieri Metcalf, 1954
- Pelitropis haitiana Fennah, 1965
- Pelitropis insularis Schmidt, 1932
- Pelitropis rotulata Van Duzee, 1908
