= Osbornia (planthopper) =

Scientific classification
- Domain: Eukaryota
- Kingdom: Animalia
- Phylum: Arthropoda
- Class: Insecta
- Order: Hemiptera
- Suborder: Auchenorrhyncha
- Infraorder: Fulgoromorpha
- Family: Tropiduchidae
- Tribe: Elicini
- Genus: Osbornia; Ball, 1910

Genus of true bugs

Osbornia is a genus of tropiduchid planthoppers in the family Tropiduchidae. There are at least two described species in Osbornia.

== Species ==
These two species belong to the genus Osbornia:

- Osbornia arborea Ball, 1935^{i c g b}
- Osbornia cornuta Ball, 1910^{i c g b}

Data sources: i = ITIS, c = Catalogue of Life, g = GBIF, b = Bugguide.net
