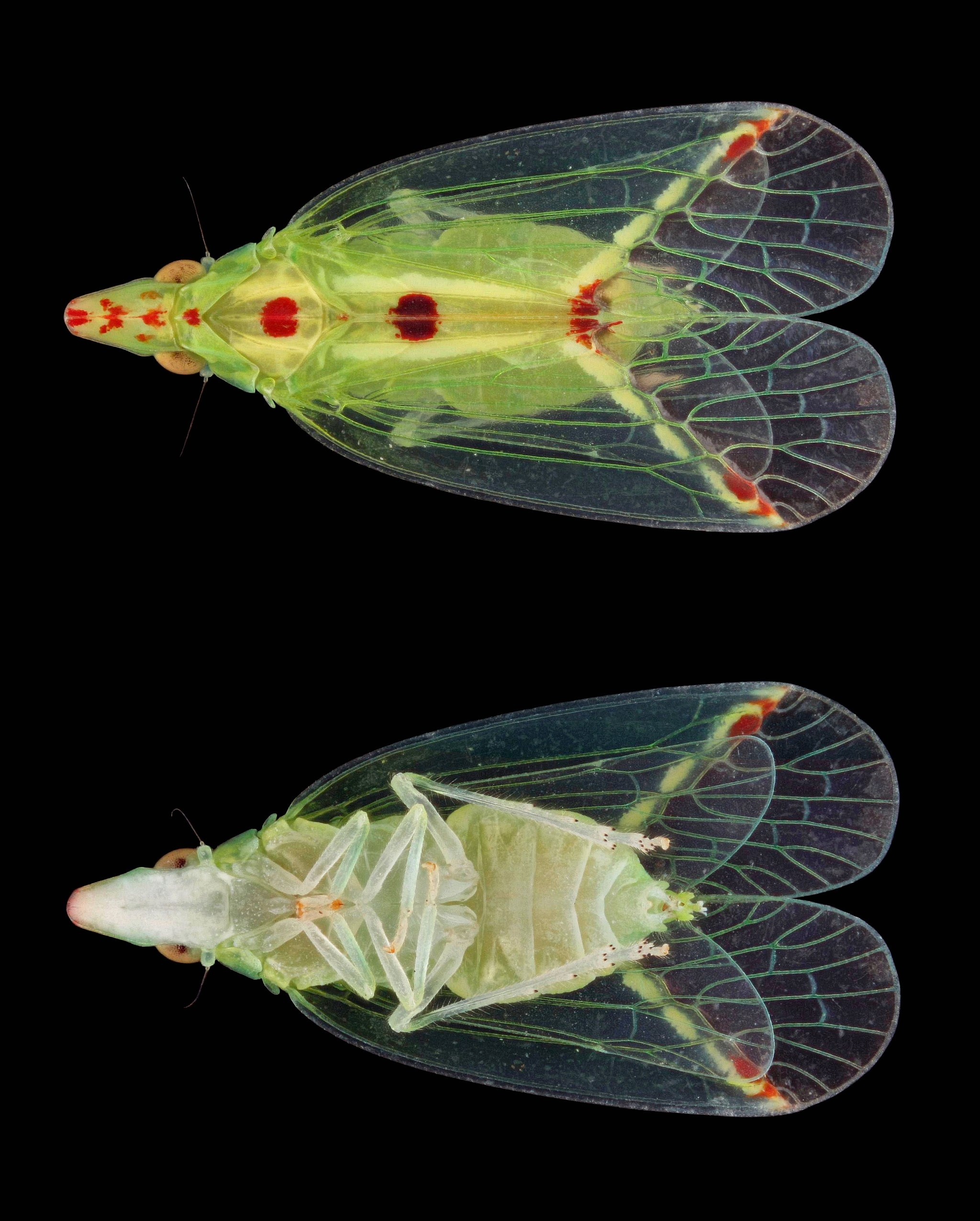
- Tambinia sexmaculata

Scientific classification
- Kingdom: Animalia
- Phylum: Arthropoda
- Clade: Pancrustacea
- Class: Insecta
- Order: Hemiptera
- Suborder: Auchenorrhyncha
- Infraorder: Fulgoromorpha
- Family: Tropiduchidae
- Subfamily: Tropiduchinae
- Tribe: Tambiniini
- Genus: Tambinia; Stål, 1859

Synonyms
- Ossa De Motschulsky, 1863; Osea De Motschulsky, 1863; Tambina Stål, 1859; Tambiana Stål, 1859

= Tambinia =

Genus of insects

Tambinia is a genus of planthoppers (Hemiptera) in the family Tropiduchidae and typical of the tribe Tambiniini (erected by Kirkaldy in 1907); species are found in Australia and Southeast Asia.

== Description ==
These are small insects, body length less than 10 mm. Width of head rounded in front (through eyes) less than width of Pronotum. Forehead and mesonotum with three carinae and the ocelli are very small. The hind tibiae have three spines.

== Taxonomy ==
In a 1982 revision (Fennah, 1982) Tambinia was included in the tribe Tambiniini: presently (2024) with about 14 other genera. Tambinia is most similar to Nesotaxila, Kallitaxila and Kallitambinia

=== Species ===
The genus Tambinia was established in Carl Stål in 1859 for three species from Sri Lanka: Tambinia languida Stål, Tambinia debilis Stål and Tambinia rufoornata Stål. Fulgoromorpha Lists on the Web currently lists:

1. Tambinia atrosignata Distant, 1906 — Sri Lanka
2. Tambinia bambusana Chang & Chen, 2012
3. Tambinia bizonata Matsumura 1914 — Japan, Taiwan
4. Tambinia capitata Distant, 1906
5. Tambinia conus Wang & Liang, 2011 — New Guinea
6. Tambinia debilis Stål, 1859 — Sri Lanka
7. Tambinia exoleta Melichar, 1914
8. Tambinia fasciculosa Melichar, 1914
9. Tambinia guamensis Metcalf, 1946
10. Tambinia inconspicua Distant, 1906
11. Tambinia languida Stål, 1859 — Sri Lanka - type species
12. Tambinia macula Wang & Liang, 2011 — Malaysia: Borneo
13. Tambinia menglunensis Men and Qin in Men, Qin and Liu, 2009
14. Tambinia pitho Fennah, 1970
15. Tambinia robustocarina Wang & Liang, 2011 — Malaysia: Sabah
16. Tambinia rubrolineata Liang in Liang and Jiang, 2003
17. Tambinia rubromaculata Distant, 1916 — Sri Lanka
18. Tambinia rufoornata Stål, 1859 — Sri Lanka
19. Tambinia sexmaculata Wang & Liang, 2011 — Australia: Kuranda
20. Tambinia similis Liang in Liang and Jiang, 2003 - southern China, Vietnam
21. Tambinia sinuata Men & Qin, 2012
22. Tambinia sisyphus Fennah, 1956
23. Tambinia theivora Fennah, 1982
24. Tambinia venusta (Kirkaldy, 1906)
25. Tambinia verticalis Distant, 1916
26. Tambinia zonata Muir, 1931
