= Tropiduchus =

Scientific classification
- Kingdom: Animalia
- Phylum: Arthropoda
- Clade: Pancrustacea
- Class: Insecta
- Order: Hemiptera
- Suborder: Auchenorrhyncha
- Infraorder: Fulgoromorpha
- Family: Tropiduchidae
- Subfamily: Tropiduchinae
- Tribe: Tropiduchini
- Genus: Tropiduchus; Stål, 1854

Genus of insects

Tropiduchus is a genus of planthoppers (order Hemiptera), recorded from Africa and Malesia.

== Taxonomy ==
Tropiduchus is the type genus of the family Tropiduchidae subfamily Tropiduchinae and tribe Tropiduchini (erected later by Carl Stål in 1866). The genera currently placed in the Tropiduchini, recorded from Africa, Asia and Australia, are:

1. Antabhoga Distant, 1912
2. Bitara Stroinski & Szwedo, 2021
3. Daradacella Fennah, 1949
4. Daradax Walker, 1857
5. Ficarasa Walker, 1857
6. Haliartus (planthopper) Melichar, 1914
7. Lavora Muir, 1931
8. Leptotambinia Kato, 1931
9. Leptovanua Melichar, 1914
10. Macrovanua Fennah, 1950
11. Montrouzierana Signoret, 1861
12. Neocatara Distant, 1910
13. Nesotemora Fennah, 1956
14. Oechalina Melichar, 1914
15. Oechalinella Wang, 2016
16. Oligaethus Jacobi, 1928
17. Peggioga Kirkaldy, 1905
18. Peltodictya Kirkaldy, 1906
19. Pseudoparicana Melichar, 1914
20. Rhinodictya Kirkaldy, 1906
21. Scenoma Fennah, 1969
22. Swezeyaria Metcalf, 1946
23. Thaumantia Melichar, 1914
24. Thymbra (planthopper) Melichar, 1914
25. Tropiduchus Stål, 1854
26. Vanua (planthopper) Kirkaldy, 1906
27. Varma (planthopper) Distant, 1906

=== Species ===
Fulgoromorpha Lists on the Web includes:

1. Tropiduchus anceps Fennah, 1958
2. Tropiduchus arisba Fennah, 1958
3. Tropiduchus asturco Fennah, 1958
4. Tropiduchus atlas Fennah, 1958
5. Tropiduchus bifasciatus Van Stalle, 1985
6. Tropiduchus castigator (Melichar, 1914)
7. Tropiduchus castigatoria (Schmidt, 1918)
8. Tropiduchus electra Fennah, 1957
9. Tropiduchus fuscatus Melichar, 1914
10. Tropiduchus ino Fennah, 1958
11. Tropiduchus iphis Fennah, 1958
12. Tropiduchus kupei Van Stalle, 1984
13. Tropiduchus luridus (Walker, 1857)
14. Tropiduchus marpsias Linnavuori, 1973
15. Tropiduchus notatus Melichar, 1914
16. Tropiduchus obiensis Melichar, 1914
17. Tropiduchus pallidus Van Stalle, 1984
18. Tropiduchus philippinus Melichar, 1914
19. Tropiduchus silvicola Van Stalle, 1984
20. Tropiduchus sobrinus Stål, 1854
  - type species (Africa)
21. Tropiduchus subfasciata (Melichar, 1914)
22. Tropiduchus variegata (Muir, 1931)
