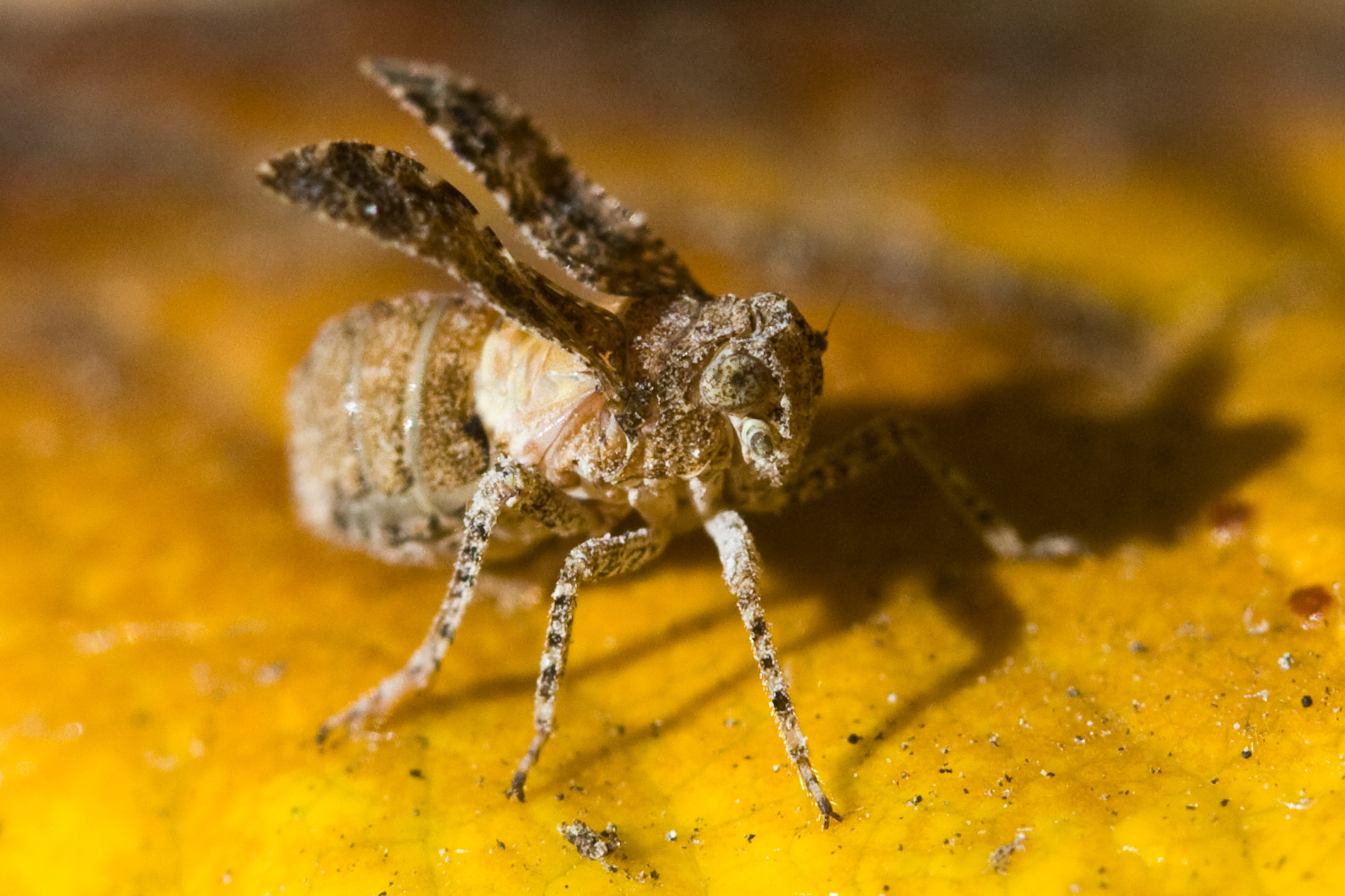
- Danepteryx sp.

Scientific classification
- Kingdom: Animalia
- Phylum: Arthropoda
- Class: Insecta
- Order: Hemiptera
- Suborder: Auchenorrhyncha
- Infraorder: Fulgoromorpha
- Family: Tropiduchidae
- Tribe: Elicini
- Genus: Danepteryx; Uhler, 1889

= Danepteryx =

Genus of true bugs

Danepteryx is a genus of tropiduchid planthoppers in the family Tropiduchidae. There are about 6 described species in Danepteryx.

== Species ==
- Danepteryx adiuncta Doering, 1940
- Danepteryx artemisiae Kirkaldy, 1908
- Danepteryx barbarae Kirkaldy, 1908
- Danepteryx lurida Melichar, 1906
- Danepteryx manca Uhler, 1889
- Danepteryx robusta Doering, 1940
