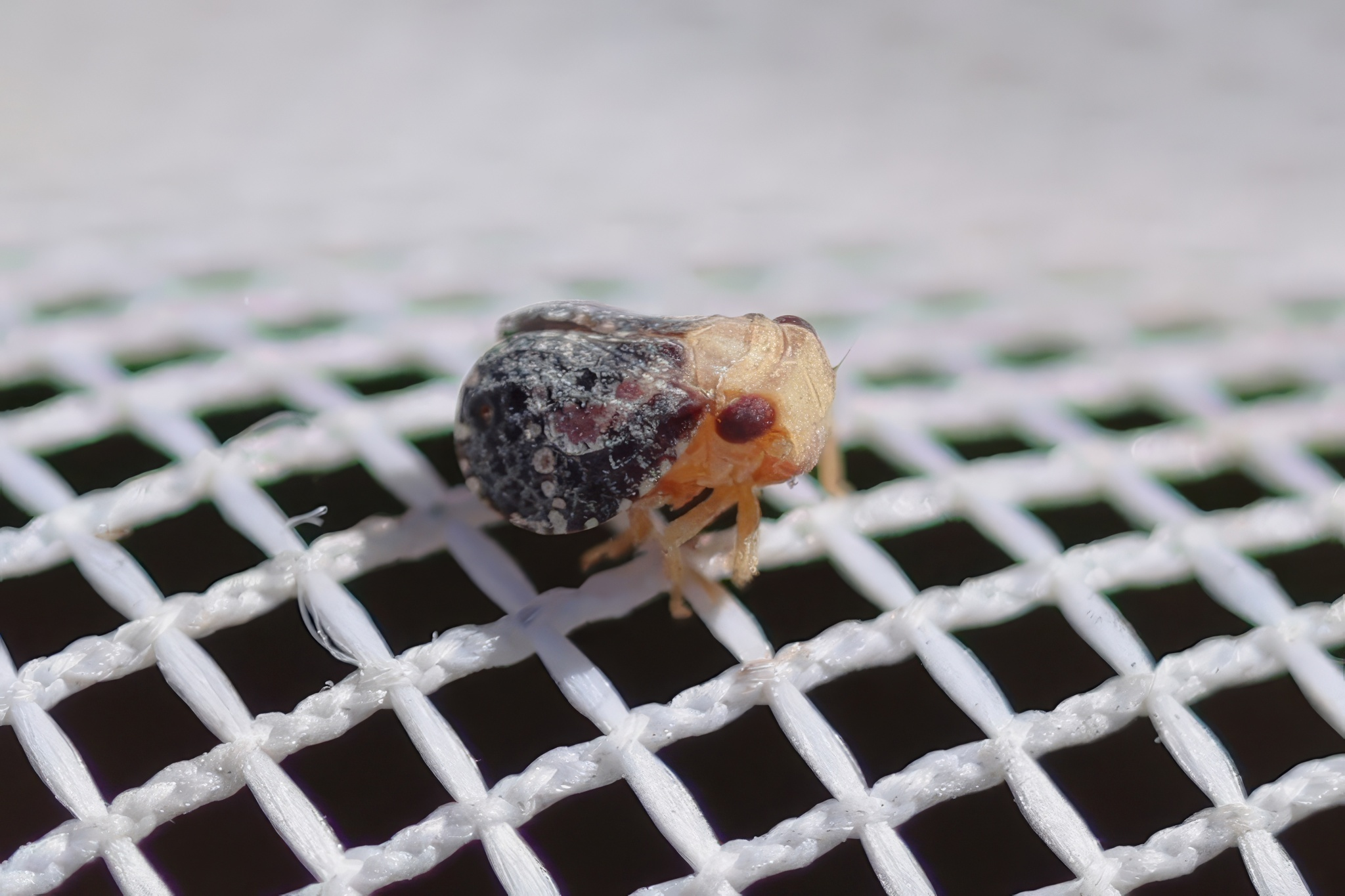
- Dictyssa maculosa

Scientific classification
- Kingdom: Animalia
- Phylum: Arthropoda
- Class: Insecta
- Order: Hemiptera
- Suborder: Auchenorrhyncha
- Infraorder: Fulgoromorpha
- Family: Tropiduchidae
- Tribe: Elicini
- Genus: Dictyssa; Melichar, 1906

= Dictyssa =

Genus of true bugs

Dictyssa is a genus of tropiduchid planthoppers in the family Tropiduchidae. There are about 17 described species in Dictyssa.

== Species ==
These 17 species belong to the genus Dictyssa:

- Dictyssa areolata Melichar, 1906
- Dictyssa beameri Doering, 1938
- Dictyssa clathrata Melichar, 1906
- Dictyssa doeringae (Ball, 1936)
- Dictyssa fenestrata Ball, 1910
- Dictyssa fusca Melichar, 1906
- Dictyssa leonilae O'Brien, 1986
- Dictyssa maculosa Doering, 1938
- Dictyssa marginepunctata Melichar, 1906
- Dictyssa mira Van Duzee, 1928
- Dictyssa monroviana Doering, 1938
- Dictyssa mutata Melichar, 1906
- Dictyssa obliqua Ball, 1910
- Dictyssa ovata Ball, 1910
- Dictyssa quadravitrea Doering, 1938
- Dictyssa schuhi O'Brien, 1986
- Dictyssa transversa Van Duzee, 1914
