= Emiliana alexandri =

Emiliana alexandri Temporal range: Middle Eocene, 47 Ma

Scientific classification
- Domain: Eukaryota
- Kingdom: Animalia
- Phylum: Arthropoda
- Class: Insecta
- Order: Hemiptera
- Suborder: Auchenorrhyncha
- Infraorder: Fulgoromorpha
- Family: Tropiduchidae
- Genus: †Emiliana
- Species: †E. alexandri

Binomial name
- †Emiliana alexandri Shcherbakov, 2006

Extinct species of true bug

Emiliana is an extinct genus of planthopper in the Tropiduchidae tribe Emilianini and containing the single species Emiliana alexandri. The species is known only from the Middle Eocene Parachute Member, part of the Green River Formation, in the Piceance Creek Basin, Garfield County, northwestern Colorado, USA.

== History and classification ==
Emiliana alexandri is known only from one fossil, the part and counterpart holotype, specimen number "PIN no. 4621/546". The specimen is composed of a single isolated tegmen which is preserved as a compression fossil in sedimentary rock. The fossil was recovered by David Kohls of Colorado Mountain College and A. P. Rasnitsyn of the Russian Academy of Sciences from outcrops of the Green River Formations Parachute Member exposed in the Anvil Points area of Garfield County, Colorado, USA. The type specimen is currently preserved in the paleoentomology collections housed in the Paleontological Institute, Russian Academy of Sciences, located in Moscow, Russia. Emiliana was first studied by Dmitry Shcherbakov of the Paleontological Institute, Russian Academy of Sciences with his 2006 type description of the tribe, genus and species being published in the Russian Entomological Journal. The generic name was coined by Shcherbakov in recognition of the world authority in planthoppers, A. F. Emeljanov, with the tribe name being a derivative of the genus name. The etymology of the specific epithet alexandri is in reference to Emeljanov's first name Alexandr.

When Emiliana alexandri was described it displaced the genus Jantaritambia, which is known from Baltic Amber specimens, as the oldest member of Tropiduchidae to be described from the fossil record, being 10 million years older than Jantaritambia. The genus is noted to be similar to the modern tropiduchid genera Neommatissus, Paricana, Pseudoparicana, and Paricanoides.

== Description ==
The E. alexandri type specimen is a well-preserved almost complete adult fore-wing, called a tegmen which is 12 millimetres (0.47 in) long. The tegmen is preserved with a mostly pale or possibly hyaline coloration with both the wing base and wing tip darkened. The forking of the Cu vein occurs much closer to the vein base then in other members of the family. Also the merging of the MP and CuA veins is distinct to the genus. Emiliana possess a crossvein, the cup-pcu is seen only in the extinct monotypic tribe Jantaritambiini.
