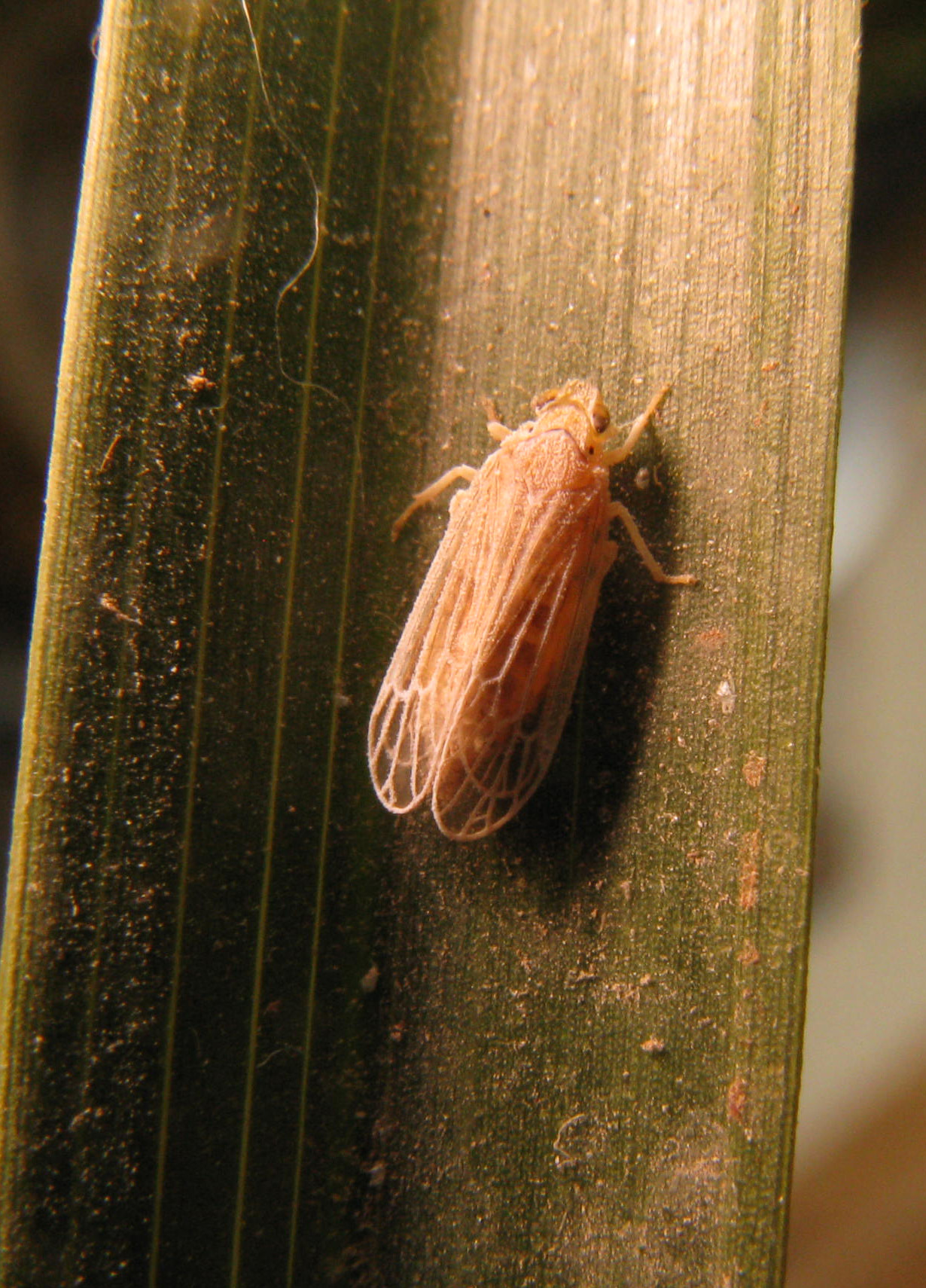
- Ommatissus lybicus

Scientific classification
- Kingdom: Animalia
- Phylum: Arthropoda
- Class: Insecta
- Order: Hemiptera
- Suborder: Auchenorrhyncha
- Infraorder: Fulgoromorpha
- Family: Tropiduchidae
- Tribe: Trypetimorphini
- Genus: Ommatissus; Fieber, 1875

= Ommatissus =

Genus of insects

Ommatissus is a genus of bugs in the subfamily Tropiduchinae and the tribe Trypetimorphini.

== Species ==
Fulgoromorpha Lists on the Web includes:

1. Ommatissus alpinus Linnavuori, 1973 (O. alpina in CoL)
2. Ommatissus bimaculatus Muir, 1931 (O. bimaculata in CoL)
3. Ommatissus binotatus Fieber, 1875 - type species
4. Ommatissus bourgoini Asche, 1994
5. Ommatissus chinsanensis Muir, 1913
6. Ommatissus kamerunus Asche & Wilson, 1989 (O. kameruna in CoL)
7. Ommatissus lofouensis Muir, 1913
8. Ommatissus lybicus de Bergevin, 1930
9. Ommatissus magribus Asche & Wilson, 1989
10. Ommatissus natalensis Asche & Wilson, 1989
11. Ommatissus tumidulus Linnavuori, 1973 (O. tumidula in CoL)
12. Ommatissus (Opatissus) vietnamicus Asche & Wilson, 1989
