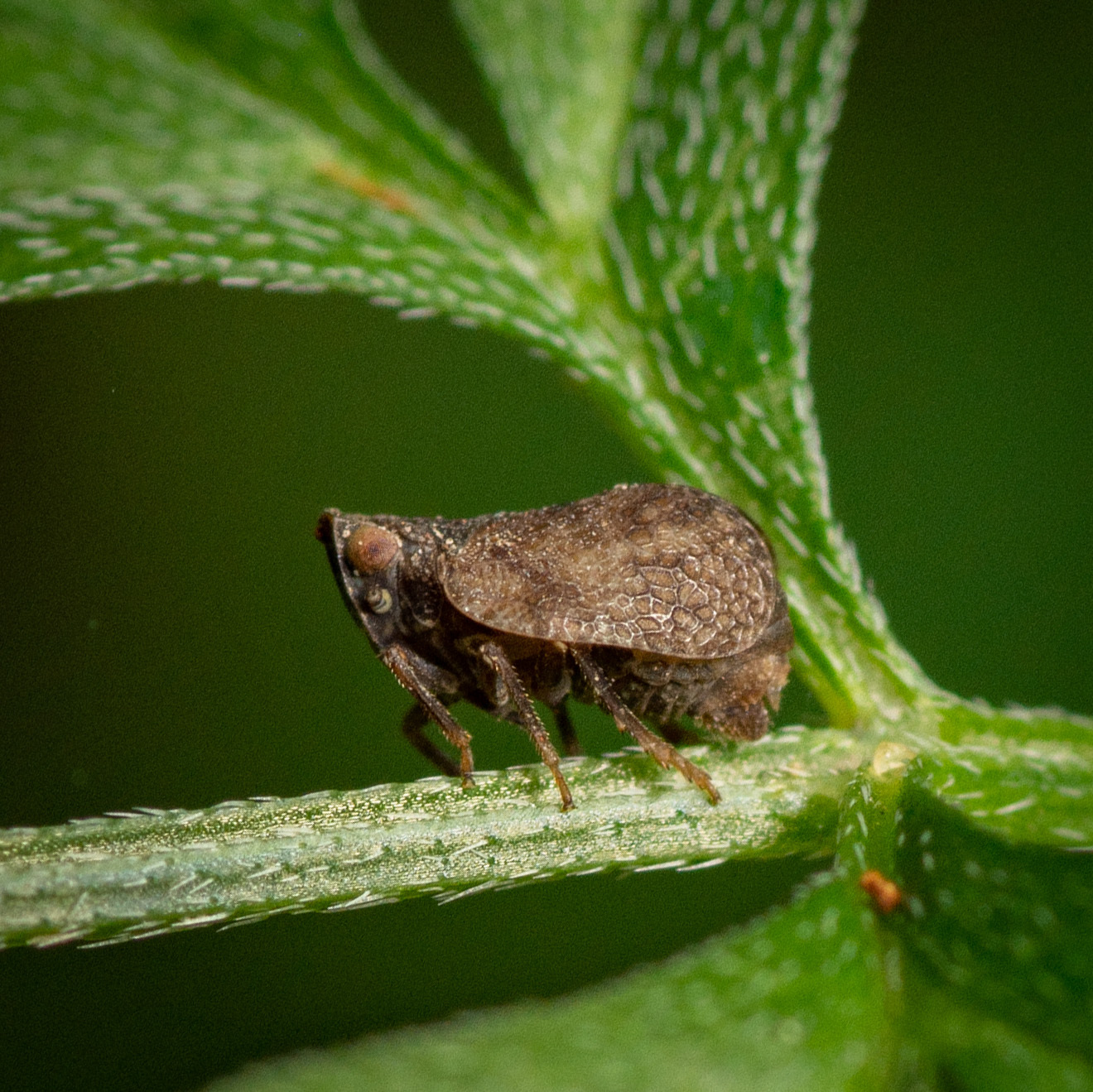
- Misodema reticulata

Scientific classification
- Kingdom: Animalia
- Phylum: Arthropoda
- Class: Insecta
- Order: Hemiptera
- Suborder: Auchenorrhyncha
- Infraorder: Fulgoromorpha
- Family: Tropiduchidae
- Tribe: Elicini
- Genus: Misodema; Melichar, 1907

= Misodema =

Genus of true bugs

Misodema is a genus of tropiduchid planthoppers in the family Tropiduchidae. There are at least two described species in the genus Misodema.

== Species ==
These two species belong to the genus Misodema:

- Misodema dubia Caldwell, 1945
- Misodema reticulata (Melichar, 1906)
