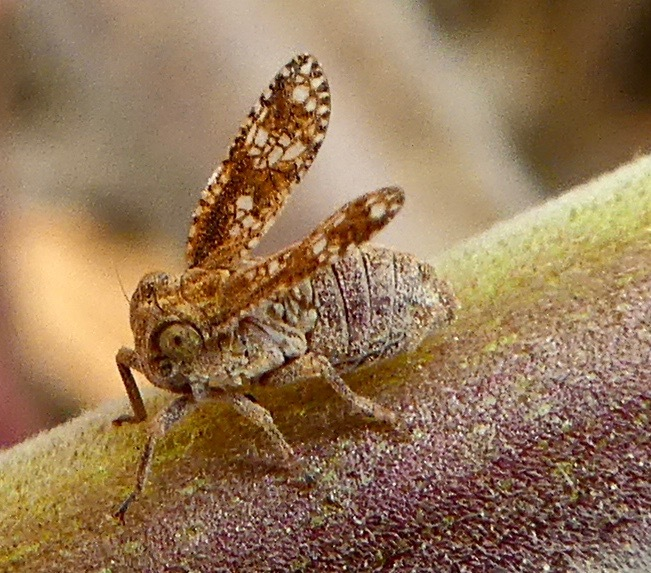
- Dyctidea intermedia

Scientific classification
- Kingdom: Animalia
- Phylum: Arthropoda
- Class: Insecta
- Order: Hemiptera
- Suborder: Auchenorrhyncha
- Infraorder: Fulgoromorpha
- Family: Tropiduchidae
- Tribe: Elicini
- Genus: Dyctidea; Uhler, 1889

= Dyctidea =

Genus of true bugs

Dyctidea is a genus of planthoppers in the family Tropiduchidae. There are about eight described species in the genus Dyctidea.

== Species ==
These eight species belong to the genus Dyctidea:

- Dyctidea angustata Uhler, 1889
- Dyctidea falcata Van Duzee, 1938
- Dyctidea intermedia Uhler, 1889
- Dyctidea nigrata Doering, 1940
- Dyctidea texana O'Brien, 1986
- Dyctidea uhleri Doering, 1940
- Dyctidea valida Doering, 1940
- Dyctidea variegata Van Duzee, 1938
