= Tangella =

Tangella (Telugu: తంగెళ్ల) is a Telugu surname. Notable people with the surname include:

- Tangella Madhavi (born 1977), Indian filmmaker
- Tangella Uday Srinivas (born 1986), Indian politician
