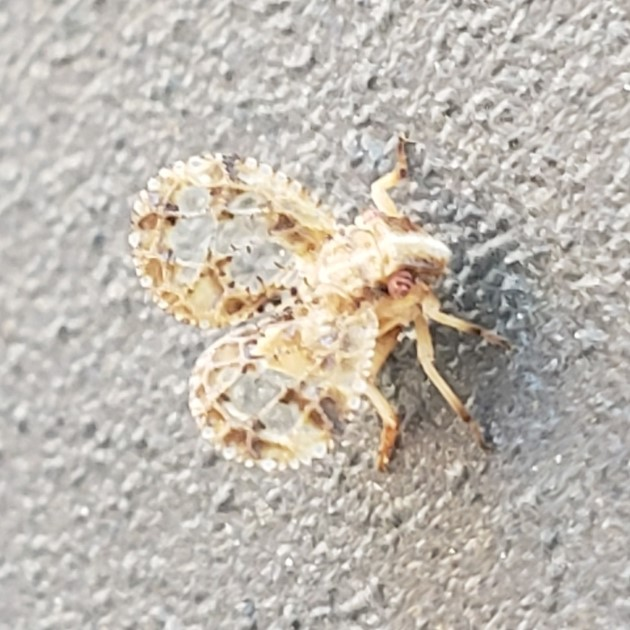

Scientific classification
- Kingdom: Animalia
- Phylum: Arthropoda
- Class: Insecta
- Order: Hemiptera
- Suborder: Auchenorrhyncha
- Infraorder: Fulgoromorpha
- Family: Tropiduchidae
- Genus: Dictyonia; Uhler, 1889
- Species: D. obscura

Binomial name
- Dictyonia obscura Uhler, 1889

= Dictyonia obscura =

Genus of true bugs

Dictyonia is a monotypic genus of tropiduchid planthoppers in the family Tropiduchidae. There is one described species: Dictyonia obscura from North America.
