= Ubis =

Ubis or UBIS may refer to:

- UBIS (Asia), Thai manufacturing company
- UBIS University, university in Washington, D.C.
- Diego Ubis (born 1977), Spanish politician

== See also ==
- Ubi (disambiguation)
