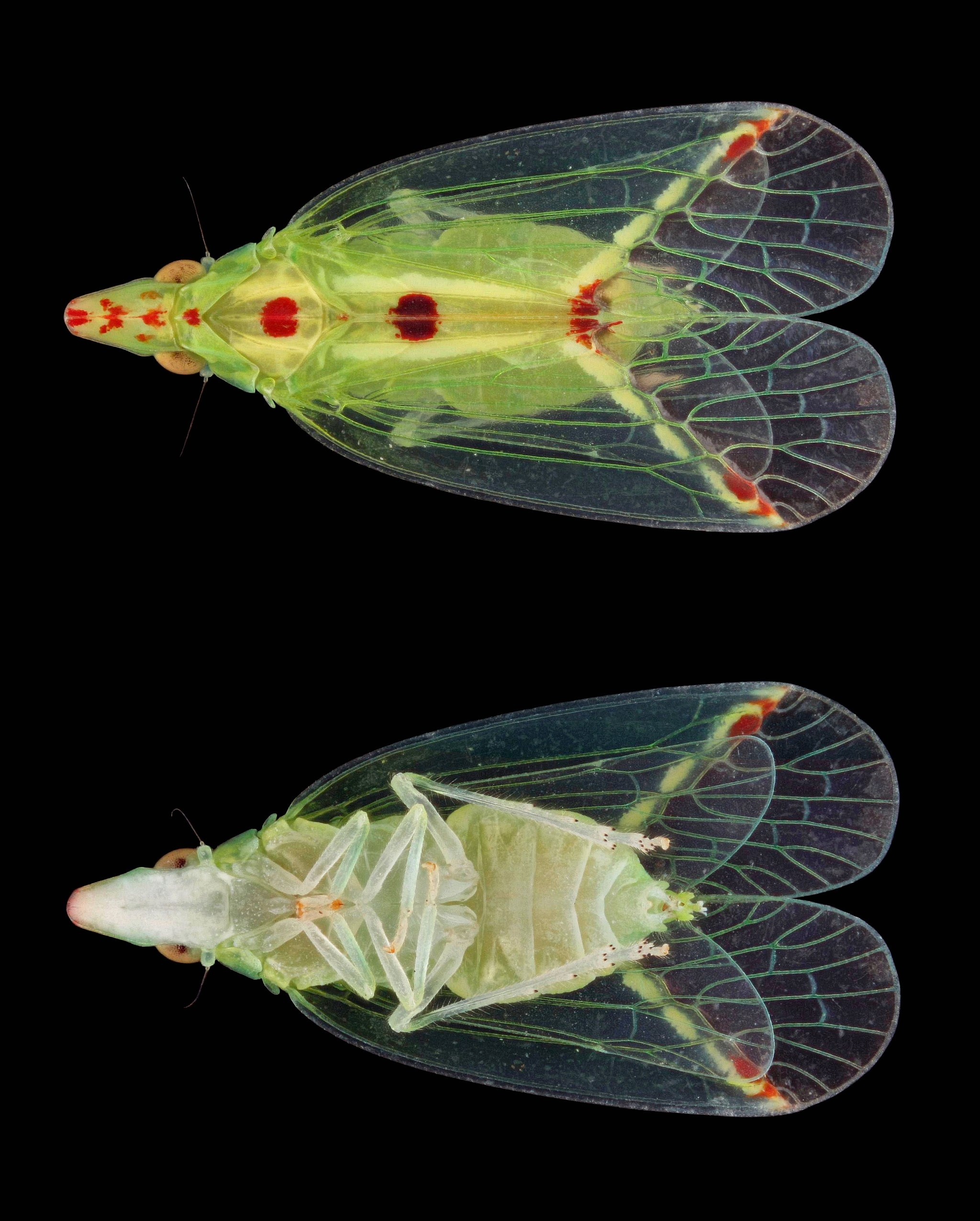
- Tambinia sexmaculata

Scientific classification
- Kingdom: Animalia
- Phylum: Arthropoda
- Clade: Pancrustacea
- Class: Insecta
- Order: Hemiptera
- Suborder: Auchenorrhyncha
- Infraorder: Fulgoromorpha
- Superfamily: Fulgoroidea
- Family: Tropiduchidae; Stål, 1866

Subfamilies
- Elicinae; Tropiduchinae

= Tropiduchidae =

Family of true bugs

Tropiduchidae is a family of planthoppers in the order Hemiptera. There are at least 160 genera and 600 described species in Tropiduchidae.

== See also ==
- List of Tropiduchidae genera
