= Neaethus fragosus =

Scientific classification
- Domain: Eukaryota
- Kingdom: Animalia
- Phylum: Arthropoda
- Class: Insecta
- Order: Hemiptera
- Suborder: Auchenorrhyncha
- Infraorder: Fulgoromorpha
- Family: Tropiduchidae
- Genus: Neaethus
- Species: N. fragosus

Binomial name
- Neaethus fragosus Van Duzee, 1921

Species of true bug

Neaethus fragosus is a species of tropiduchid planthopper in the family Tropiduchidae. It is found in North America.
