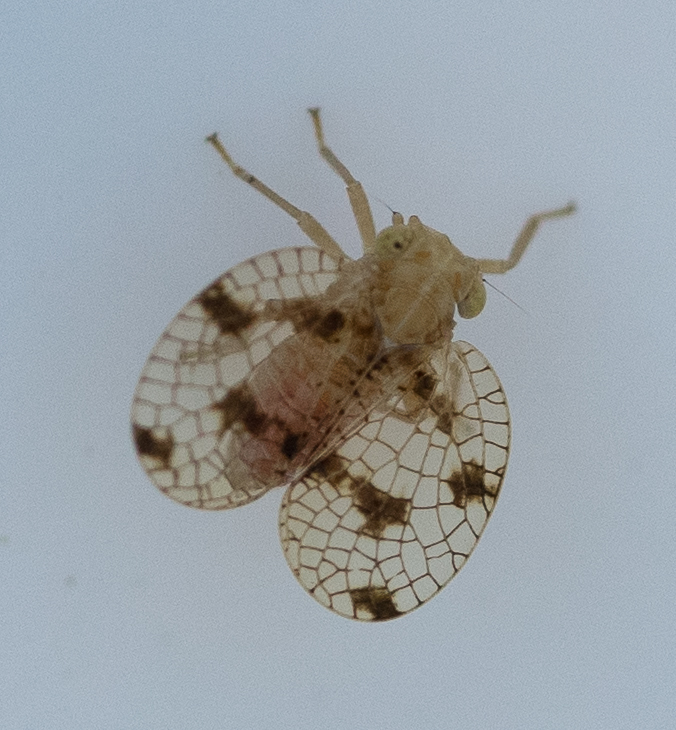

Scientific classification
- Kingdom: Animalia
- Phylum: Arthropoda
- Class: Insecta
- Order: Hemiptera
- Suborder: Auchenorrhyncha
- Infraorder: Fulgoromorpha
- Family: Tropiduchidae
- Genus: Neaethus
- Species: N. maculatus

Binomial name
- Neaethus maculatus Melichar, 1906

= Neaethus maculatus =

Species of true bug

Neaethus maculatus is a species of tropiduchid planthopper in the family Tropiduchidae. It is found in North America.

== Subspecies ==
There are two subspecies recognised:

- Neaethus maculatus fasciatus Van Duzee, 1917
- Neaethus maculatus maculatus Melichar, 1906
