= Neaethus vitripennis =

Scientific classification
- Kingdom: Animalia
- Phylum: Arthropoda
- Clade: Pancrustacea
- Class: Insecta
- Order: Hemiptera
- Suborder: Auchenorrhyncha
- Infraorder: Fulgoromorpha
- Family: Tropiduchidae
- Genus: Neaethus
- Species: N. vitripennis

Binomial name
- Neaethus vitripennis (Stål, 1854)

Species of true bug

Neaethus vitripennis is a species of tropiduchid planthopper in the family Tropiduchidae. It is found in North America.
