= Neaethus perlucidus =

Scientific classification
- Domain: Eukaryota
- Kingdom: Animalia
- Phylum: Arthropoda
- Class: Insecta
- Order: Hemiptera
- Suborder: Auchenorrhyncha
- Infraorder: Fulgoromorpha
- Family: Tropiduchidae
- Genus: Neaethus
- Species: N. perlucidus

Binomial name
- Neaethus perlucidus Doering, 1939

Species of true bug

Neaethus perlucidus is a species of tropiduchid planthopper in the family Tropiduchidae. It is found in North America.
