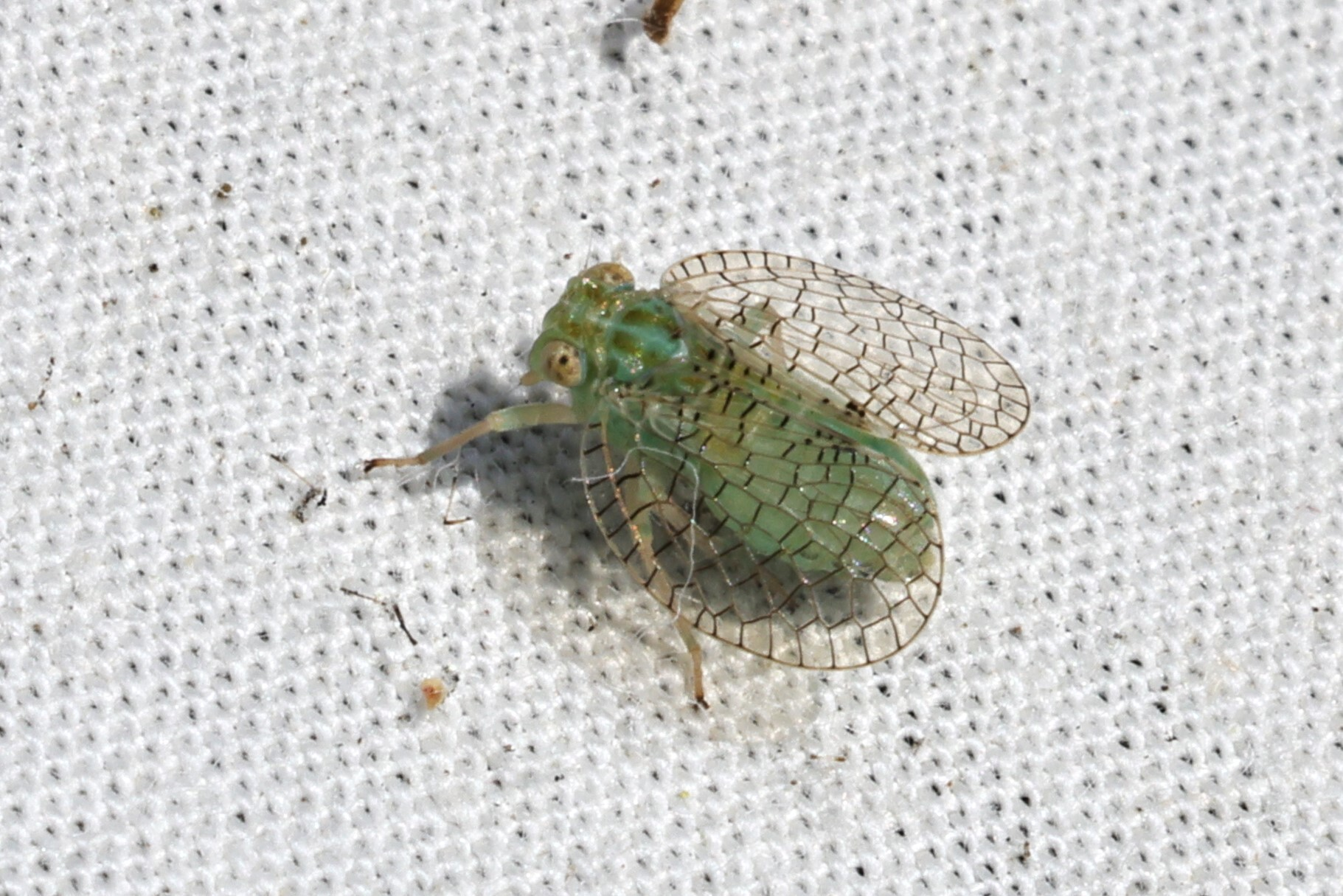

Scientific classification
- Kingdom: Animalia
- Phylum: Arthropoda
- Class: Insecta
- Order: Hemiptera
- Suborder: Auchenorrhyncha
- Infraorder: Fulgoromorpha
- Family: Tropiduchidae
- Genus: Neaethus
- Species: N. grossus

Binomial name
- Neaethus grossus Melichar, 1906

= Neaethus grossus =

Species of true bug

Neaethus grossus is a species of tropiduchid planthopper in the family Tropiduchidae. It is found in North America.

== Subspecies ==
These two subspecies belong to the species Neaethus grossus:

- Neaethus grossus grossus Melichar, 1906
- Neaethus grossus pallidus Melichar, 1906
