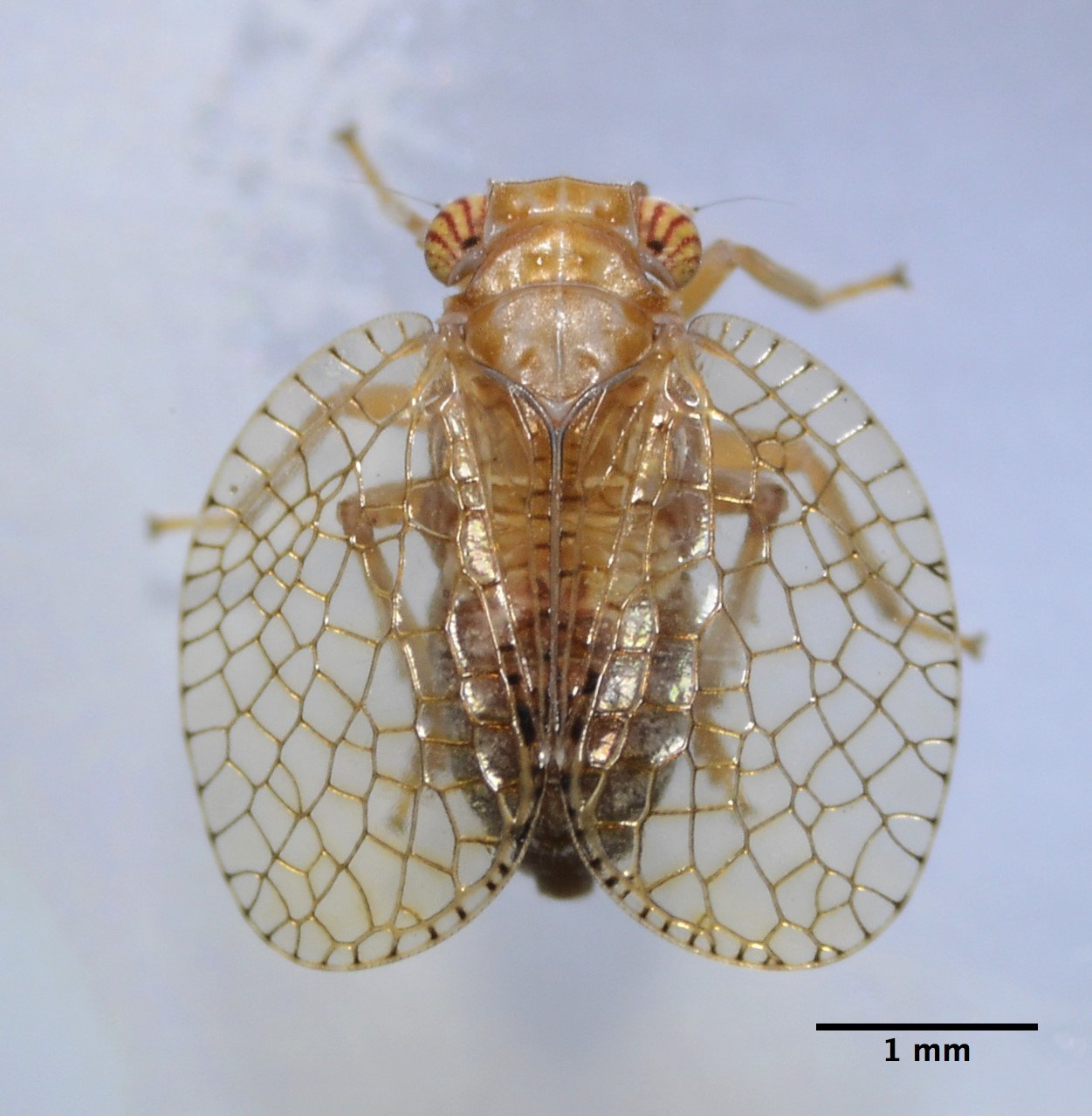

Scientific classification
- Kingdom: Animalia
- Phylum: Arthropoda
- Class: Insecta
- Order: Hemiptera
- Suborder: Auchenorrhyncha
- Infraorder: Fulgoromorpha
- Family: Tropiduchidae
- Genus: Neaethus
- Species: N. similis

Binomial name
- Neaethus similis Doering, 1939

= Neaethus similis =

Species of true bug

Neaethus similis is a species of tropiduchid planthopper in the family Tropiduchidae. It is found in North America.
