= Neaethus (planthopper) =

Scientific classification
- Kingdom: Animalia
- Phylum: Arthropoda
- Clade: Pancrustacea
- Class: Insecta
- Order: Hemiptera
- Suborder: Auchenorrhyncha
- Infraorder: Fulgoromorpha
- Family: Tropiduchidae
- Tribe: Elicini
- Genus: Neaethus; Stål, 1861

Genus of true bugs

Neaethus is a genus of tropiduchid planthoppers in the family Tropiduchidae. There are about 17 described species in Neaethus.

== Species ==
These 17 species belong to the genus Neaethus:

- Neaethus bicornis Doering, 1941^{i c g}
- Neaethus consuetus Doering, 1941^{i c g}
- Neaethus curvaminis Doering, 1939^{i c g}
- Neaethus diversus Doering, 1939^{i c g}
- Neaethus fenestratus Melichar, 1906^{i c g}
- Neaethus fragosus Van Duzee, 1921^{i c g b}
- Neaethus grossus Melichar, 1906^{i c g b}
- Neaethus jacintiensus Doering, 1939^{i c g b}
- Neaethus maculatus Melichar, 1906^{i c g b}
- Neaethus nigronervosus Melichar, 1906^{i c g}
- Neaethus perlucidus Doering, 1939^{i c g b}
- Neaethus semivitreus Fowler, 1896^{i c g}
- Neaethus similis Doering, 1939^{i c g b}
- Neaethus sinehamatus Doering, 1939^{i c g}
- Neaethus unicus Doering, 1941^{i c g}
- Neaethus uniformus Doering, 1939^{i c g}
- Neaethus vitripennis (Stål, 1854)^{i c g b}

Data sources: i = ITIS, c = Catalogue of Life, g = GBIF, b = Bugguide.net
